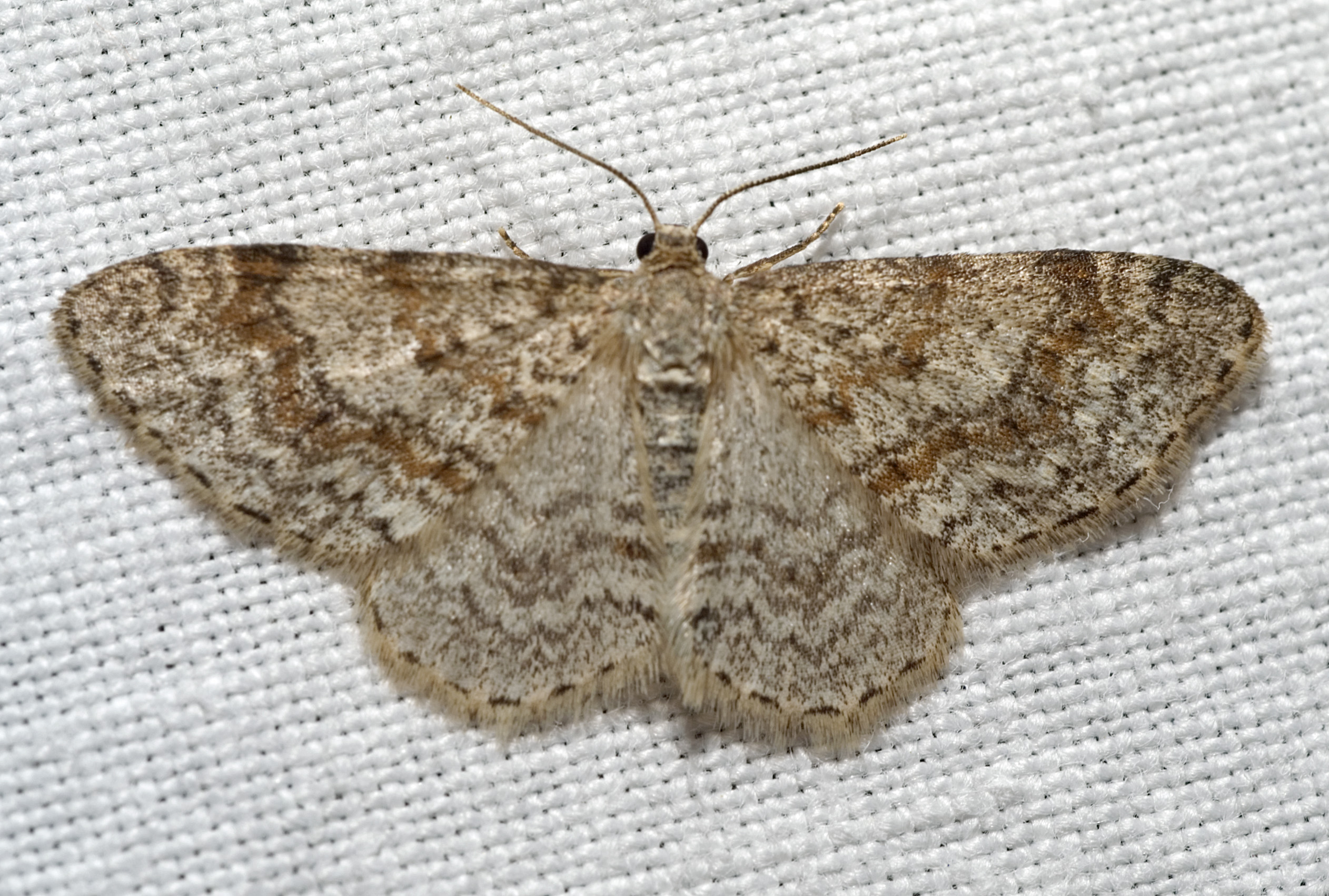
- Waved carpet (Hydrelia sylvata)

Scientific classification
- Domain: Eukaryota
- Kingdom: Animalia
- Phylum: Arthropoda
- Class: Insecta
- Order: Lepidoptera
- Family: Geometridae
- Subfamily: Larentiinae
- Tribe: Asthenini; Warren, 1893

Genera
- See text

Synonyms
- Astheninae

= Asthenini =

Tribe of moths

Asthenini is a tribe of geometer moths under subfamily Larentiinae first described by Warren in 1893. The tribe has been combined with Eupitheciini in the past, most notably by Jeremy Daniel Holloway in his work The Moths of Borneo.

== Recognized genera and species ==
Critical analysis by Dayong Xue and Malcolm J. Scoble indicated 18 genera that belong to the Asthenini with 1 additional, ungrouped species. The 18 genera recognized by this research are:

- Agnibesa Moore 1888
- Anydrelia Prout 1938
- Asthena Hübner 1825
- Asthenotricha Warren 1899
- Bihastina Prout 1916
- Epicyme Meyrick 1885
- Eschatarchia Warren 1894
- Euchoeca Hübner 1823
- Hastina Moore 1888
- Hydrelia Hübner 1825
- Leucoctenorrhoe Warren 1904
- Macrohastina Inoue 1982
- Nomenia Pearsall 1905
- Palpoctenidia Prout 1930
- Parasthena Warren 1902
- Poecilasthena Warren 1894
- Polynesia Swinhoe 1892
- Venusia Curtis 1839

Later research re-included the following genera:

- Eois (but see below)
- Minoa (but see below)
- Pseudostegania Butler, 1881

== Disassociated genera ==
The following 7 genera are sometimes associated with the Asthenini, but were excluded by the work of Xue and Scoble:

- Chaetolopha
- Chalyboclydon
- Cleptocosmia
- Pseudopolynesia
- Trichodezia

Eois and Minoa were excluded by Xue and Scoble, but later again included by Viidalepp in 2011.

== Species incertae sedis ==
Species 'Chalyboclydon' flexilinea was identified by Xue and Scoble as being part of the Asthenini. However, it has not been associated with a specific Asthenini genus.
