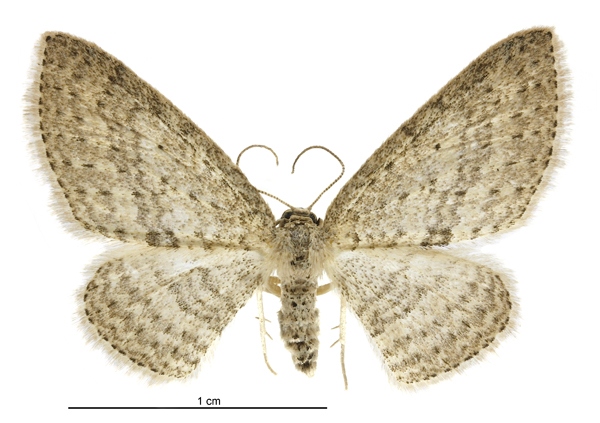
- Female

Scientific classification
- Kingdom: Animalia
- Phylum: Arthropoda
- Clade: Pancrustacea
- Class: Insecta
- Order: Lepidoptera
- Family: Geometridae
- Genus: Poecilasthena
- Species: P. schistaria

Binomial name
- Poecilasthena schistaria (Walker, 1861)

Synonyms
- Acidalia schistaria Walker, 1861; Asthena schistaria (Walker, 1861)

= Poecilasthena schistaria =

Species of moth endemic to New Zealand

Poecilasthena schistaria, also known as the kānuka looper, is a moth in the family Geometridae. It was first described by Francis Walker in 1861. It is endemic to New Zealand and is found throughout the country. P. schistraia inhabits native forest, scrubland and domestic gardens. The larvae have been observed hatching from November to January and feed on the leaves of mānuka and kānuka. The larvae pupates about one inch below the surface of the earth or directly on the soil underneath the larval host plant. The pupa is enclosed in a slight cocoon. Adults are on wing all year round but most commonly from October to May. They are nocturnal and are attracted to light. During the daytime adults can be observed resting with outspread wings on tree trunks or fences.

== Taxonomy ==
This species was first described by Francis Walker in 1861 using as specimen collected by Thomas R. Oxley in Nelson and originally named Acidalia schistaria. In 1884 Edward Meyrick placed this species in the genus Asthena. In 1927 Louis Beethoven Prout separated Poecilasthena subpurpureata from P. schistaria and argued that both these species belonged to the genus Poecilasthena. George Hudson discussed and illustrated this species under the name Asthena schistaria both in his 1898 book New Zealand moths and butterflies (Macro-lepidoptera) and in his 1928 book The butterflies and moths of New Zealand. In 1988 John S. Dugdale discussed this species within the genus Poecilasthena and this placement was confirmed in 2002. The female holotype is held at the Natural History Museum, London.

== Description ==
Moth at rest on tree trunk.

P. schistaria showing pairs of dashes on edge of wings.

Walker originally described the adult female of the species as follows:

Purplish cinereous. Head brown. Abdomen with two rows of blackish points. Legs smooth. Wings elongate, minutely brown-speckled, with two or three almost obsolete submarginal lines; discal point black, rather large; marginal points black, elongated. Fore wings acute; costa hardly convex; exterior line blackish, nearly straight, very oblique, with its fore half merely distinguished by points. Hind wings extending beyond the abdomen. Length of the body 33 lines ; of the wings 14 lines.

In 1928 Hudson followed Prout and accepted that this species had previously been confounded with the moth now known as P. subpurpureata and so described the adults of P. schistaria as follows:

The expansion of the wings is seven-eighths of an inch. The fore-wings have the apex rather acute and the termen of the hind-wings in both sexes gently rounded without any tooth; in the male the tornus is rounded, in the female angled. All the wings are pale greyish-ochreous; there are numerous indistinct paler wavy transverse lines, often obsolete, especially in the male and the edges of the median band are sometimes distinctly indicated, towards the dorsum, by clear fine blackish lines. The cilia of the hind-wings of the male are thick and long becoming brush-like and the claspers are much shorter than in Asthena subpurpureata.

The adults can be distinguished by the pairs of black coloured dashes along the outer edge of the wings. Epicyme rubropunctaria is a similar but smaller species that may be confused with P. schistaria but has instead single black dots on the outer edge of the wings.

Hudson described the larva of P. schistaria as follows:

The larva, which feeds on Manuka (Leptospermum), is very ornamental. Its general colour is light green, with black dorsal and lateral stripes, and a series of diagonal markings bordered with crimson ; the legs and prolegs are also crimson, and the segments are divided by brilliant yellow rings, a white line extending down each side of the larva.

Hudson stated that the larva of P. schistaria also closely resembles that of P. subpurpureata but is generally slimmer with the pink markings absent; there are yellowish lateral lines and a fine blackish dorsal line.

== Distribution ==
This species is endemic to New Zealand and is found throughout the country.

== Habitat and hosts ==
P. schistaria frequents most habitats where its larval host plants can be found. This includes native forest and scrubland as well as domestic gardens. The larvae of this species feed on the leaves of mānuka and kānuka.

== Life cycle and behaviour ==
Frederick Wollaston Hutton, who first described the larva of this species, noted that the larva hatched in November. Meyrick noted that larvae were present in December and January. The larva remains closely concealed amongst the dense Mānuka foliage, from which it can be dislodged only by vigorous and continued beating. The larva allows itself to fall a short distance, hanging suspended by a silken thread, which they rapidly ascend when the danger is past. The habits of this and the larvae of P. subpurpureata appear identical and they are constantly found feeding together. The pupa is enclosed in a slight cocoon about one inch below the surface of the earth or directly on the soil underneath the larval host plant. Adults are on wing all year round but most commonly from October to May. They are nocturnal and are attracted to light. As a result of the pale colour of the adults it can easily be observed when flying in the evening. During the daytime adults can be observed resting with outspread wings on tree trunks or fences.
