= Eois dissimilis =

Scientific classification
- Kingdom: Animalia
- Phylum: Arthropoda
- Clade: Pancrustacea
- Class: Insecta
- Order: Lepidoptera
- Family: Geometridae
- Genus: Eois
- Species: E. dissimilis

Binomial name
- Eois dissimilis (Moore, 1887)

Synonyms
- Pseudasthena dissimilis Moore, 1887; Cambogia dissimilis Moore, 1887

Species of moth

Eois dissimilis is a moth in the family Geometridae. It is found in the Indian Subregion and Sri Lanka.

== Description ==
Wingspan is about 20mm. Antennae of male ciliated. Hind wings with veins 3 and 4 stalked. Similar to Polynesia sunandava, differ in there being hardly any traces of silver except on the subcostal fascia of fore wing. The rufous spots replaced by ill-defined antemedial, postmedial and submarginal lines and a few scattered specks.
