= Tafa (disambiguation) =

Tafa may refer to:

- Tafa, Local Government Area in Nigeria
- Temple of Taffeh, Egypt
- Tafa Air, former Albanian low-cost airline
- Parachaetolopha tafa, a moth in the family Geometridae found in Papua New Guinea
- Shortened version of Mustafa
- Tafa Balogun (born 1947), Nigerian Inspector General of the Nigerian Police
- Lisiate Tafa (born 1979), Tongan rugby union football player
- Nexhati Tafa, Albanian screenwriter
- Askale Tafa (born 1984), Ethiopian female marathon runner

== See also ==
- Tafas, a town in southern Syria
