= Poecilasthena cisseres =

Scientific classification
- Kingdom: Animalia
- Phylum: Arthropoda
- Clade: Pancrustacea
- Class: Insecta
- Order: Lepidoptera
- Family: Geometridae
- Genus: Poecilasthena
- Species: P. cisseres

Binomial name
- Poecilasthena cisseres Turner, 1933

Species of moth

Poecilasthena cisseres is a moth of the family Geometridae first described by Alfred Jefferis Turner in 1933. It is found in Australia, including Victoria.

== Original description ==
Female, 28 mm. Head grey-whitish; face brownish; fillet white. Palpi under 1: brown-whitish. Antennae whitish. Thorax dull bluish-green. Abdomen dull bluish-green; apex whitish; underside pale grey. Legs pale fuscous; posterior pair whitish. Forewings triangular, costa moderately arched, apex pointed, termen nearly straight, moderately oblique; dull bluish-green with white markings; costal edge grey throughout; antemedian line from 1/3 costa to 3/8 dorsum, slightly curved outwards, slender, indistinct towards costa; postmedian from 2/3 costa to 5/8 dorsum, stronger, slightly outwardly curved, becoming sinuate towards dorsum; cilia pale grey. Hindwings with termen strongly rounded; as forewings but lines more approximated. Very distinct, but nearest Poecilasthena euphylla. Victoria: Moe, in February; one specimen.

— Original description by Alfred Jefferis Turner
