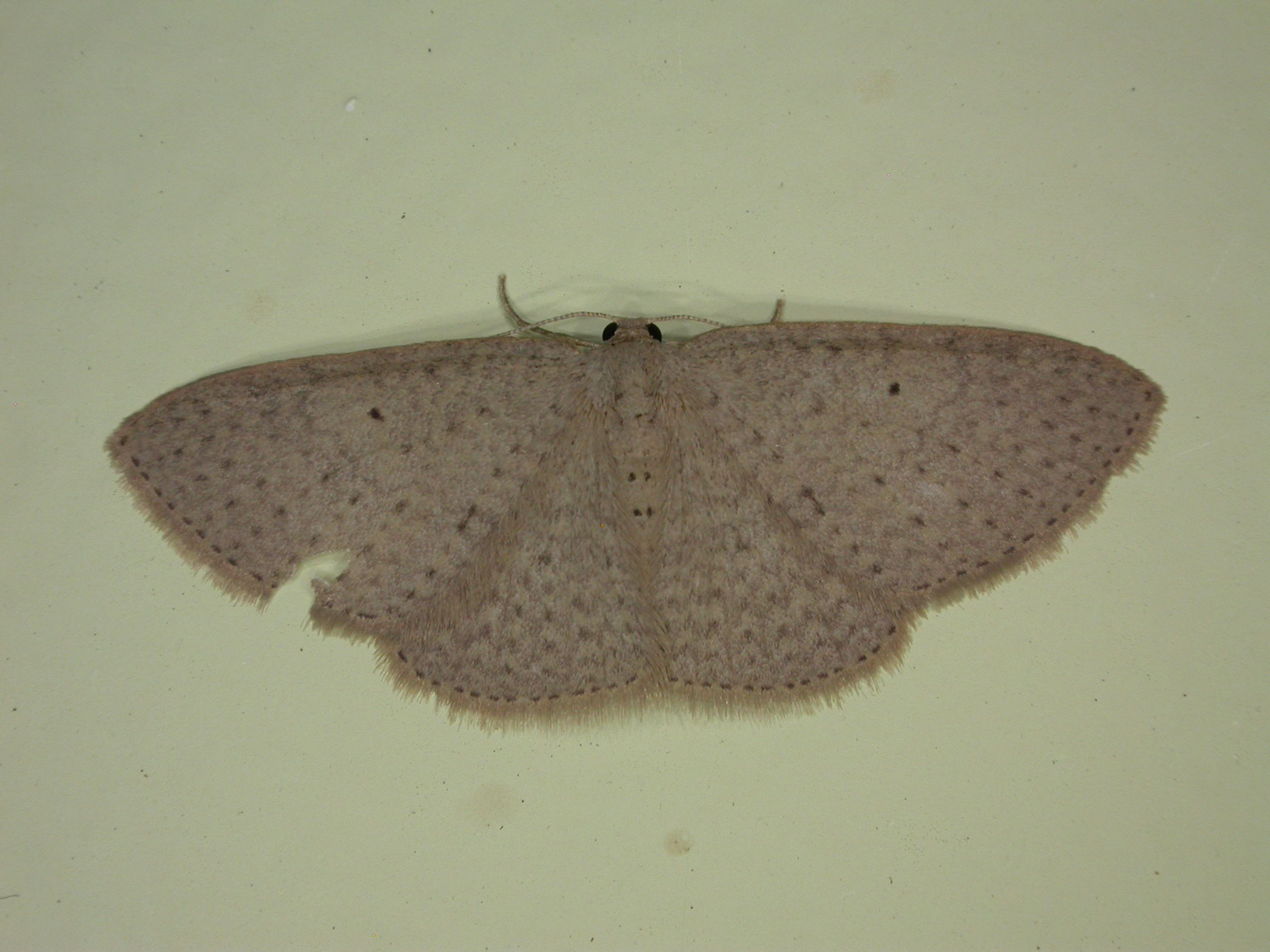
- Poecilasthena anthodes

Scientific classification
- Kingdom: Animalia
- Phylum: Arthropoda
- Class: Insecta
- Order: Lepidoptera
- Family: Geometridae
- Tribe: Asthenini
- Genus: Poecilasthena; Warren, 1894

Synonyms
- Astheniodes Hampson, 1903

= Poecilasthena =

Genus of moths

Poecilasthena is a genus of moths in the family Geometridae.

== Species ==
- unnamed group
  - Poecilasthena aedaea Turner, 1926
  - Poecilasthena balioloma (Turner, 1907)
  - Poecilasthena burmensis Prout, 1926
  - Poecilasthena character Prout, 1932
  - Poecilasthena cisseres Turner, 1933
  - Poecilasthena dimorpha Holloway, 1979
  - Poecilasthena euphylla (Meyrick, 1891)
  - Poecilasthena fragilis Turner, 1942
  - Poecilasthena glaucosa (Lucas, 1888)
  - Poecilasthena inhaesa Prout, 1934
  - Poecilasthena iopolia (Turner, 1926)
  - Poecilasthena ischnophrica Turner, 1941
  - Poecilasthena leucydra Prout, 1934
  - Poecilasthena limnaea Prout, 1926
  - Poecilasthena nubivaga Prout, 1932
  - Poecilasthena oceanias (Meyrick, 1891)
  - Poecilasthena panapala Turner, 1922
  - Poecilasthena paucilinea Warren, 1906
  - Poecilasthena phaeodryas Turner, 1931
  - Poecilasthena pisicolor Turner, 1942
  - Poecilasthena prouti West, 1929
  - Poecilasthena pulchraria (Doubleday, 1843)
  - Poecilasthena scoliota (Meyrick, 1891)
  - Poecilasthena sthenommata Turner, 1922
  - Poecilasthena subpurpureata (Walker, 1863)
  - Poecilasthena thalassias (Meyrick, 1891)
  - Poecilasthena urarcha (Meyrick, 1891)
- papuensis group
  - Poecilasthena euthecta (Turner, 1904) (alternatively listed under Minoa)
  - Poecilasthena papuensis (Warren, 1906)
- anthodes group
  - Poecilasthena anthodes (Meyrick, 1891)
  - Poecilasthena schistaria (Walker, 1861)
  - Poecilasthena xylocyma (Meyrick, 1891)
