= Anydrelia dharmsalae =

Scientific classification
- Domain: Eukaryota
- Kingdom: Animalia
- Phylum: Arthropoda
- Class: Insecta
- Order: Lepidoptera
- Family: Geometridae
- Genus: Anydrelia
- Species: A. dharmsalae

Binomial name
- Anydrelia dharmsalae (Butler, 1883)

Synonyms
- Ephyra dharmsalae Butler, 1883

Species of moth

Anydrelia dharmsalae is a moth in the family Geometridae. It is found in India.
