= Agnibesa punctilinearia =

Scientific classification
- Domain: Eukaryota
- Kingdom: Animalia
- Phylum: Arthropoda
- Class: Insecta
- Order: Lepidoptera
- Family: Geometridae
- Genus: Agnibesa
- Species: A. punctilinearia

Binomial name
- Agnibesa punctilinearia (Leech, 1897)

Synonyms
- Hydrelia punctilinearia Leech, 1897

Species of moth

Agnibesa punctilinearia is a moth in the family Geometridae. It is found in Western China.
