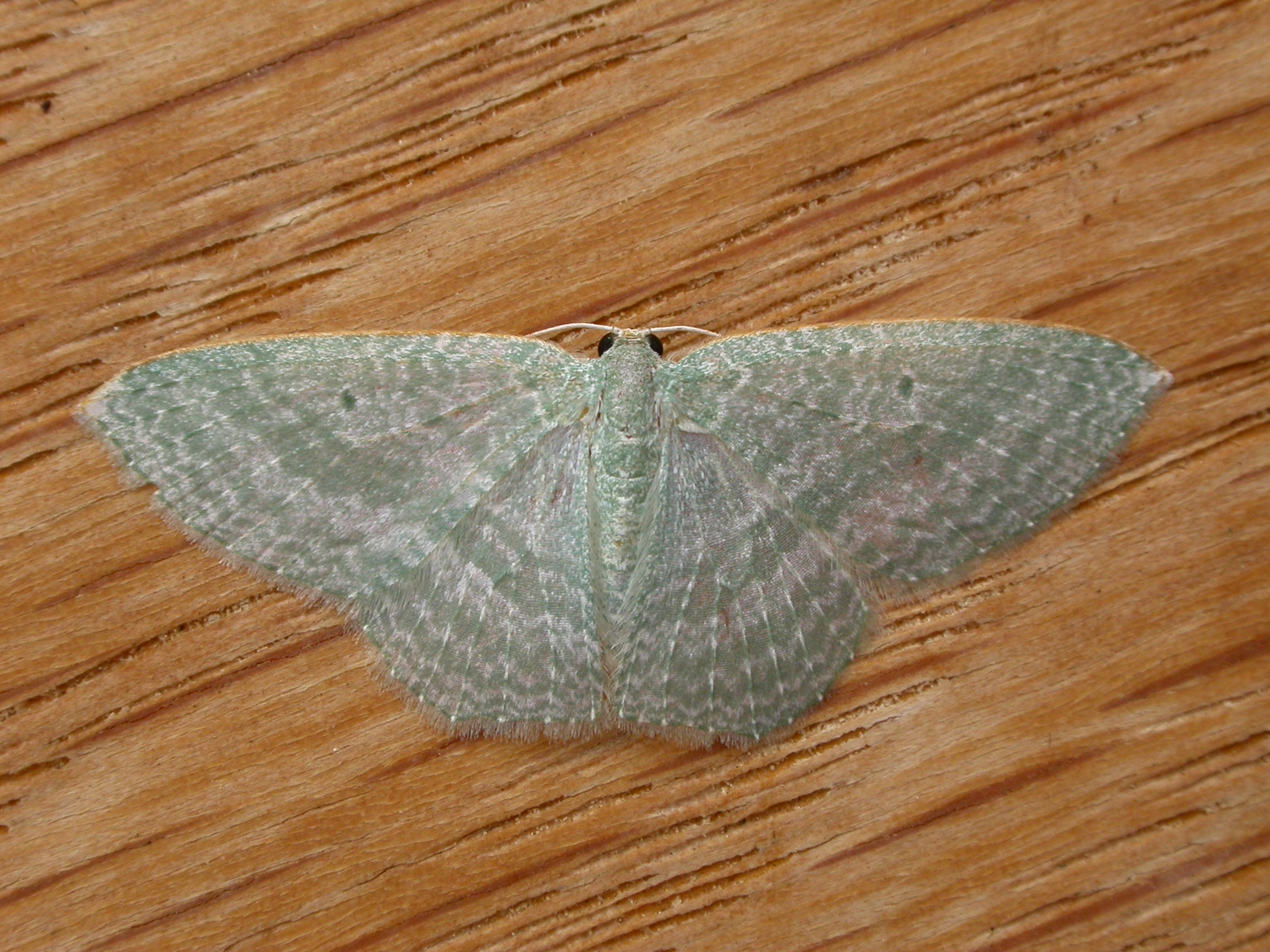

Scientific classification
- Kingdom: Animalia
- Phylum: Arthropoda
- Clade: Pancrustacea
- Class: Insecta
- Order: Lepidoptera
- Family: Geometridae
- Genus: Poecilasthena
- Species: P. thalassias

Binomial name
- Poecilasthena thalassias (Meyrick, 1891)

Synonyms
- Asthena thalassias Meyrick, 1891; Asthena pellucida T.P. Lucas, 1892

= Poecilasthena thalassias =

Species of moth

Poecilasthena thalassias is a moth of the family Geometridae. It is known from Australia.
