= Poecilasthena leucydra =

Scientific classification
- Kingdom: Animalia
- Phylum: Arthropoda
- Clade: Pancrustacea
- Class: Insecta
- Order: Lepidoptera
- Family: Geometridae
- Genus: Poecilasthena
- Species: P. leucydra

Binomial name
- Poecilasthena leucydra Prout, 1934

Species of moth

Poecilasthena leucydra is a moth in the family Geometridae. It is found on Fiji.
