= Macrohastina stenozona =

Scientific classification
- Kingdom: Animalia
- Phylum: Arthropoda
- Clade: Pancrustacea
- Class: Insecta
- Order: Lepidoptera
- Family: Geometridae
- Genus: Macrohastina
- Species: M. stenozona

Binomial name
- Macrohastina stenozona (L. B. Prout, 1926)

Synonyms
- Hastina azela stenozona Prout, 1926; Hastina stenozona

Species of moth

Macrohastina stenozona is a moth in the family Geometridae first described by Louis Beethoven Prout in 1926. It is found in Myanmar, India and China.
