= Parachaetolopha coerulescens =

Scientific classification
- Domain: Eukaryota
- Kingdom: Animalia
- Phylum: Arthropoda
- Class: Insecta
- Order: Lepidoptera
- Family: Geometridae
- Genus: Parachaetolopha
- Species: P. coerulescens

Binomial name
- Parachaetolopha coerulescens (Warren, 1906)

Synonyms
- Tephroclystia coerulescens Warren, 1906; Chaetolopha coerulescens

Species of moth

Parachaetolopha coerulescens is a moth in the family Geometridae. It is found in Papua New Guinea.
