= Polynesia curtitibia =

Scientific classification
- Kingdom: Animalia
- Phylum: Arthropoda
- Clade: Pancrustacea
- Class: Insecta
- Order: Lepidoptera
- Family: Geometridae
- Genus: Polynesia
- Species: P. curtitibia

Binomial name
- Polynesia curtitibia Prout, 1922

Species of moth

Polynesia curtitibia is a moth in the family Geometridae. It is found in the north-eastern Himalayas, Thailand and on Borneo. The habitat consists of lowland and upper montane forests.
