= Anydrelia =

Scientific classification
- Kingdom: Animalia
- Phylum: Arthropoda
- Clade: Pancrustacea
- Class: Insecta
- Order: Lepidoptera
- Family: Geometridae
- Tribe: Asthenini
- Genus: Anydrelia; Prout, 1938

Genus of geometer moths

Anydrelia is a genus of moths in the family Geometridae.

== Species ==
- Anydrelia dharmsalae (Butler, 1883)
- Anydrelia distorta (Hampson, 1895)
- Anydrelia plicataria (Leech, 1897)
