= Parachaetolopha ornatipennis =

Scientific classification
- Domain: Eukaryota
- Kingdom: Animalia
- Phylum: Arthropoda
- Class: Insecta
- Order: Lepidoptera
- Family: Geometridae
- Genus: Parachaetolopha
- Species: P. ornatipennis

Binomial name
- Parachaetolopha ornatipennis (Warren, 1906)

Synonyms
- Tephroclystia ornatipennis Warren, 1906; Chaetolopha ornatipennis

Species of moth

Parachaetolopha ornatipennis is a moth in the family Geometridae. It is found in Papua New Guinea.
