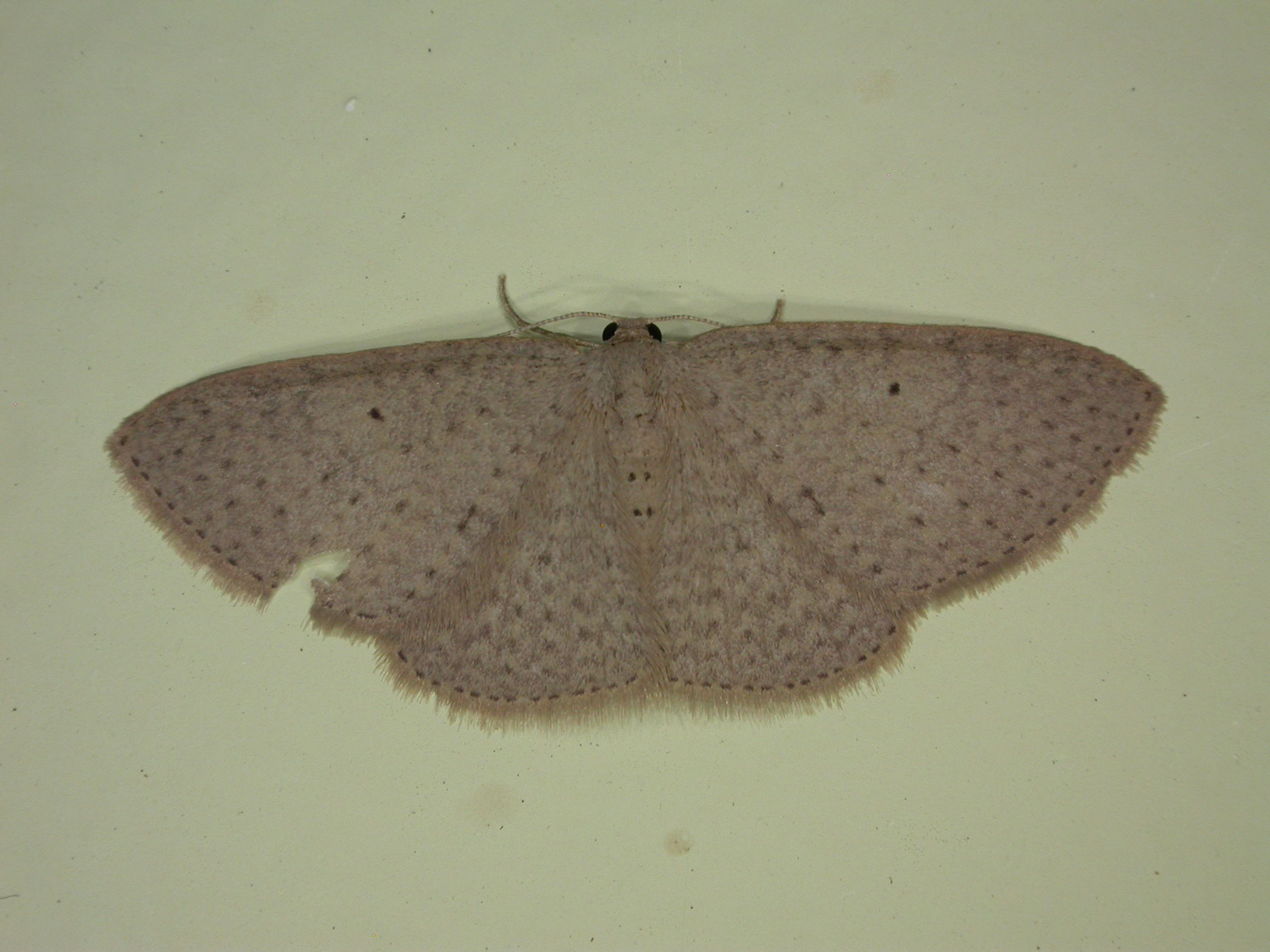

Scientific classification
- Kingdom: Animalia
- Phylum: Arthropoda
- Class: Insecta
- Order: Lepidoptera
- Family: Geometridae
- Genus: Poecilasthena
- Species: P. anthodes

Binomial name
- Poecilasthena anthodes (Meyrick, 1891)

Synonyms
- Asthena anthodes Meyrick, 1891

= Poecilasthena anthodes =

Species of moth

Poecilasthena anthodes is a moth of the family Geometridae. It is found in Queensland, Victoria, Western Australia and Tasmania.
