= Macrohastina gemmifera =

Scientific classification
- Domain: Eukaryota
- Kingdom: Animalia
- Phylum: Arthropoda
- Class: Insecta
- Order: Lepidoptera
- Family: Geometridae
- Genus: Macrohastina
- Species: M. gemmifera

Binomial name
- Macrohastina gemmifera (Moore, 1868)

Synonyms
- Acidalia gemmifera Moore, 1868

Species of moth

Macrohastina gemmifera is a moth in the family Geometridae first described by Frederic Moore in 1868. It is found in India, Nepal and China.
