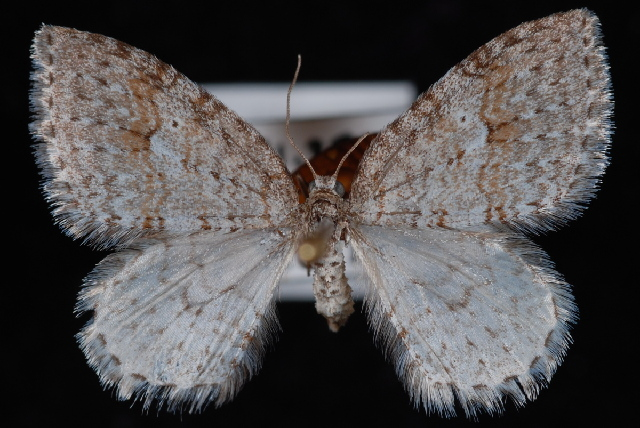

Scientific classification
- Kingdom: Animalia
- Phylum: Arthropoda
- Clade: Pancrustacea
- Class: Insecta
- Order: Lepidoptera
- Family: Geometridae
- Genus: Nomenia
- Species: N. duodecimlineata

Binomial name
- Nomenia duodecimlineata (Packard, 1873)

Synonyms
- Larentia duodecimlineata Packard, 1873; Venusia duodecimlineata (Packard, 1873); Nomenia unipecta Pearsall, 1906

= Nomenia duodecimlineata =

Species of moth

Nomenia duodecimlineata is a moth in the family Geometridae first described by Alpheus Spring Packard in 1873. It is found in western North America, from British Columbia to California, Nevada, Arizona and New Mexico.

The wingspan is about 22 mm. The forewings are dark gray. Adults are on wing in spring.

== Subspecies ==
- Nomenia duodecimlineata duodecimlineata (Packard, 1873)
- Nomenia duodecimlineata secunda Pearsall, 1906
