= Poecilasthena paucilinea =

Scientific classification
- Kingdom: Animalia
- Phylum: Arthropoda
- Clade: Pancrustacea
- Class: Insecta
- Order: Lepidoptera
- Family: Geometridae
- Genus: Poecilasthena
- Species: P. paucilinea

Binomial name
- Poecilasthena paucilinea Warren, 1906

Species of moth

Poecilasthena paucilinea is a moth in the family Geometridae. It is known from eastern New Guinea.
