= Macrohastina =

Scientific classification
- Kingdom: Animalia
- Phylum: Arthropoda
- Class: Insecta
- Order: Lepidoptera
- Family: Geometridae
- Tribe: Asthenini
- Genus: Macrohastina; Inoue, 1982

Genus of moths

Macrohastina is a genus of moths in the family Geometridae.

== Species ==
- Macrohastina azela (Butler, 1878)
- Macrohastina gemmifera (Moore, 1868)
- Macrohastina stenozona (Prout, 1926)
