= Chaetolopha niphosticha =

Scientific classification
- Kingdom: Animalia
- Phylum: Arthropoda
- Clade: Pancrustacea
- Class: Insecta
- Order: Lepidoptera
- Family: Geometridae
- Genus: Chaetolopha
- Species: C. niphosticha

Binomial name
- Chaetolopha niphosticha (Turner, 1907)

Synonyms
- Scordylia niphosticha Turner, 1907

Species of moth

Chaetolopha niphosticha is a moth in the family Geometridae. It is found in the Australian states of Queensland, New South Wales and Victoria.
