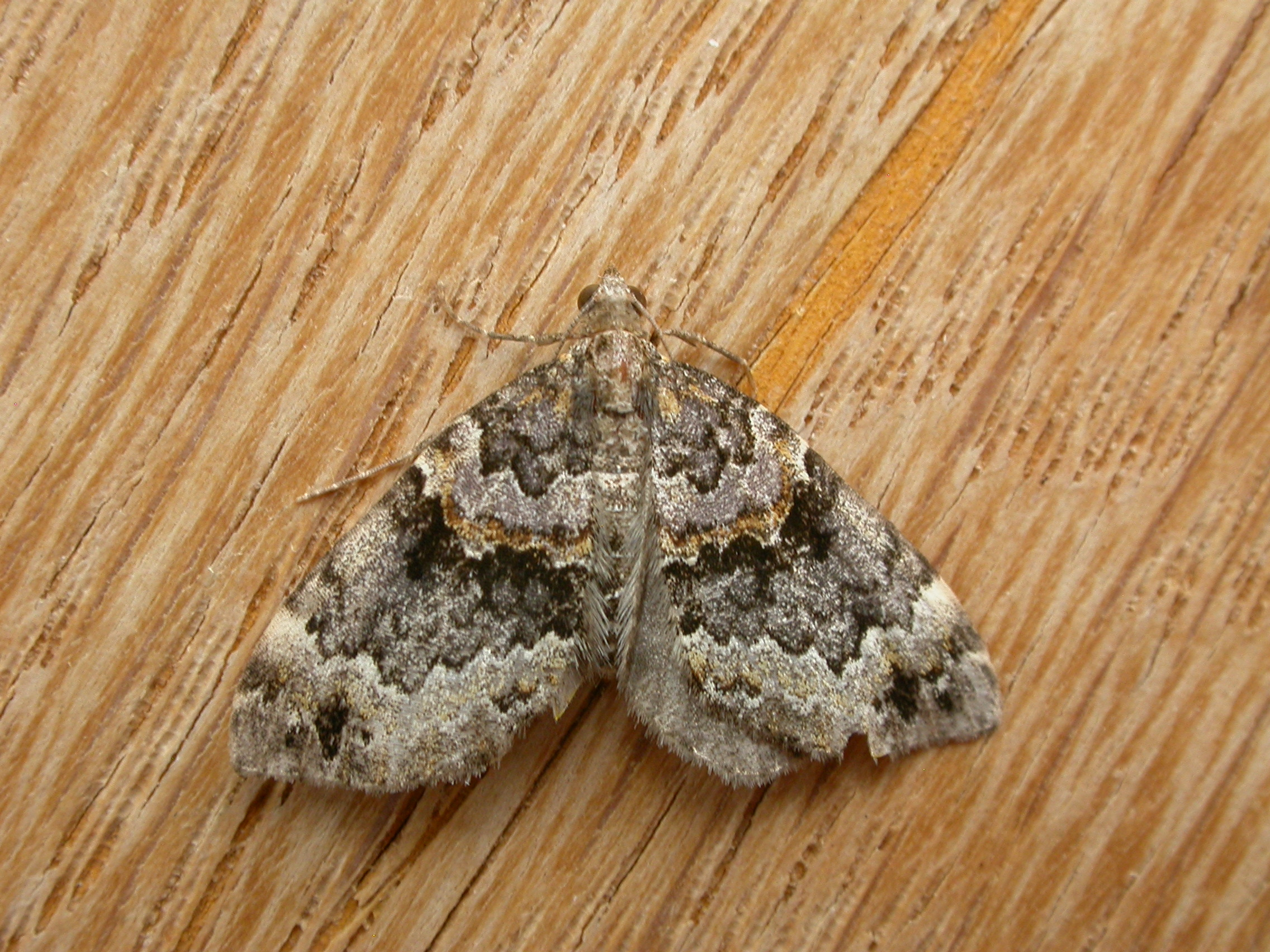

Scientific classification
- Kingdom: Animalia
- Phylum: Arthropoda
- Clade: Pancrustacea
- Class: Insecta
- Order: Lepidoptera
- Family: Geometridae
- Genus: Chaetolopha
- Species: C. decipiens

Binomial name
- Chaetolopha decipiens (Butler, 1886)

Synonyms
- Cidaria decipiens Butler, 1886

= Chaetolopha decipiens =

Species of moth

Chaetolopha decipiens is a species of moth of the family Geometridae. It is known from New South Wales.

The larvae are thought to feed on Polypodiophyta species.
