= Poecilasthena aedaea =

Scientific classification
- Domain: Eukaryota
- Kingdom: Animalia
- Phylum: Arthropoda
- Class: Insecta
- Order: Lepidoptera
- Family: Geometridae
- Genus: Poecilasthena
- Species: P. aedaea

Binomial name
- Poecilasthena aedaea Turner, 1926

Synonyms
- Minoa aedaea

Species of moth

Poecilasthena aedaea is a moth in the family Geometridae. It is found in Australia, including Tasmania.
