= Eschatarchia =

Scientific classification
- Domain: Eukaryota
- Kingdom: Animalia
- Phylum: Arthropoda
- Class: Insecta
- Order: Lepidoptera
- Family: Geometridae
- Tribe: Asthenini
- Genus: Eschatarchia; Warren, 1894
- Species: E. lineata

Binomial name
- Eschatarchia lineata Warren, 1894

Synonyms
- Hydrelia angularia Leech, 1897; Eschatarchia lineata formosana Inoue, 1970

Genus of moths

Eschatarchia is a monotypic moth genus in the family Geometridae. It contains only one species, Eschatarchia lineata, which is found in Japan, China, Taiwan and Myanmar. Both the genus and species were first described by Warren in 1894.
