= Poecilasthena dimorpha =

Scientific classification
- Kingdom: Animalia
- Phylum: Arthropoda
- Clade: Pancrustacea
- Class: Insecta
- Order: Lepidoptera
- Family: Geometridae
- Genus: Poecilasthena
- Species: P. dimorpha

Binomial name
- Poecilasthena dimorpha Holloway, 1979

Species of moth

Poecilasthena dimorpha is a moth in the family Geometridae. It is found in New Caledonia.
