= Parachaetolopha =

Scientific classification
- Domain: Eukaryota
- Kingdom: Animalia
- Phylum: Arthropoda
- Class: Insecta
- Order: Lepidoptera
- Family: Geometridae
- Subfamily: Larentiinae
- Genus: Parachaetolopha; Schmidt, 2002

Genus of moths

Parachaetolopha is a genus of moths in the family Geometridae. Most species were previously included in the genus Chaetolopha.

== Species ==
- Parachaetolopha anomala (Prout, 1941)
- Parachaetolopha coerulescens (Warren, 1906)
- Parachaetolopha collatisaeta Schmidt, 2002
- Parachaetolopha ferruginoapex Schmidt, 2002
- Parachaetolopha flavicorpus (Warren, 1906)
- Parachaetolopha nepenthes (Prout, 1941)
- Parachaetolopha ornatipennis (Warren, 1906)
- Parachaetolopha peregrina (Prout, 1929)
- Parachaetolopha petasitruncula Schmidt, 2002
- Parachaetolopha spinosicornuta Schmidt, 2002
- Parachaetolopha tafa (Prout, 1941)
- Parachaetolopha turbinata (Prout, 1941)
