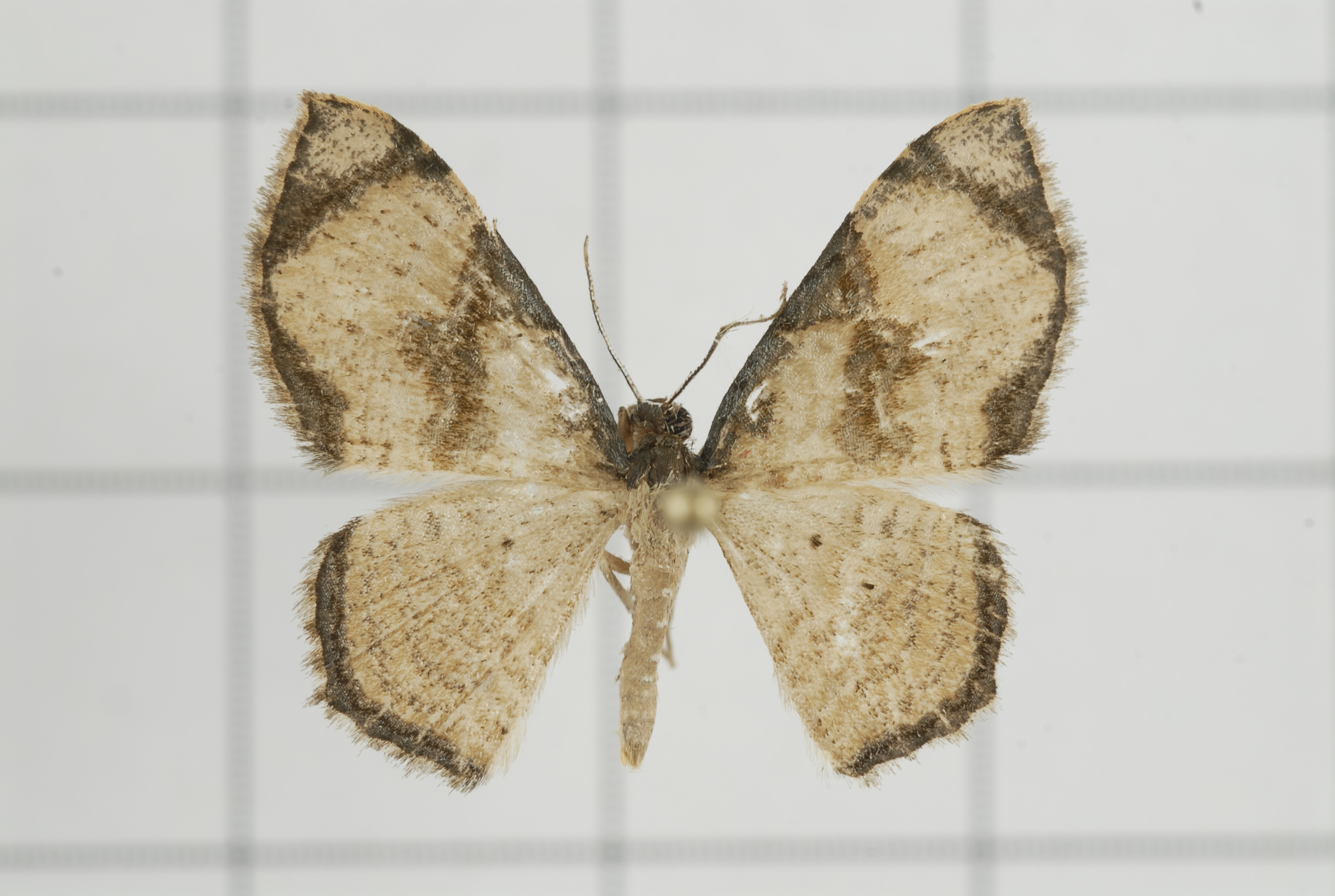

Scientific classification
- Domain: Eukaryota
- Kingdom: Animalia
- Phylum: Arthropoda
- Class: Insecta
- Order: Lepidoptera
- Family: Geometridae
- Genus: Chalyboclydon
- Species: C. marginata

Binomial name
- Chalyboclydon marginata Warren, 1893

Synonyms
- Hydrelia apicata Wileman, 1916

= Chalyboclydon marginata =

Species of moth

Chalyboclydon marginata is a moth in the family Geometridae first described by William Warren in 1893. It is found in Myanmar, China and the Indian state of Sikkim.
