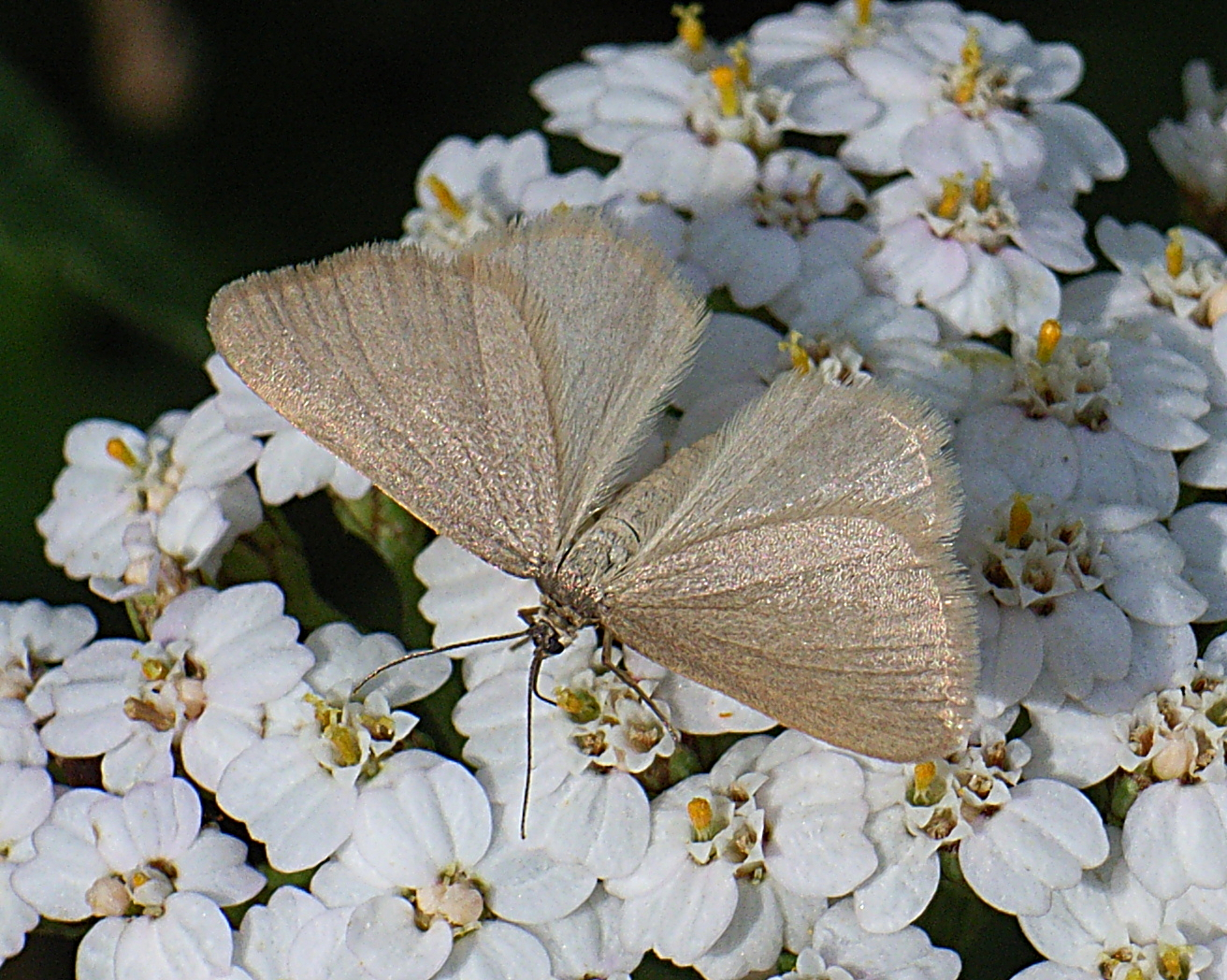
- Minoa murinata

Scientific classification
- Domain: Eukaryota
- Kingdom: Animalia
- Phylum: Arthropoda
- Class: Insecta
- Order: Lepidoptera
- Family: Geometridae
- Tribe: Asthenini
- Genus: Minoa; Treitschke, 1825

= Minoa (moth) =

Genus of moths

Minoa is a genus of moths in the family Geometridae. The genus was described by Treitschke in 1825.

== Species ==
- Minoa euthecta (Turner, 1904)
- Minoa murinata (Scopoli, 1763) – drab looper
