= Parachaetolopha anomala =

Scientific classification
- Kingdom: Animalia
- Phylum: Arthropoda
- Clade: Pancrustacea
- Class: Insecta
- Order: Lepidoptera
- Family: Geometridae
- Genus: Parachaetolopha
- Species: P. anomala

Binomial name
- Parachaetolopha anomala (Prout, 1941)

Synonyms
- Chaetolopha anomala Prout, 1941; Chaetolopha ornatipennis anomala Prout, 1941

Species of moth

Parachaetolopha anomala is a moth in the family Geometridae. It is found in Papua New Guinea.
