= Parachaetolopha petasitruncula =

Scientific classification
- Domain: Eukaryota
- Kingdom: Animalia
- Phylum: Arthropoda
- Class: Insecta
- Order: Lepidoptera
- Family: Geometridae
- Genus: Parachaetolopha
- Species: P. petasitruncula

Binomial name
- Parachaetolopha petasitruncula Schmidt, 2002

Species of moth

Parachaetolopha petasitruncula is a moth in the family Geometridae first described by Olga Schmidt in 2002. It is found in Papua New Guinea.
