= Anydrelia distorta =

Scientific classification
- Kingdom: Animalia
- Phylum: Arthropoda
- Class: Insecta
- Order: Lepidoptera
- Family: Geometridae
- Genus: Anydrelia
- Species: A. distorta

Binomial name
- Anydrelia distorta (Hampson, 1895)

Synonyms
- Hydrelia distorta Hampson, 1895

Species of moth

Anydrelia distorta is a moth in the family Geometridae first described by George Hampson in 1895. It is found in India, Nepal and China.

The wingspan is about 26 mm. Adults are rufous, irrorated with fuscous. The forewings with traces of an antemedial line and a speck at the end of the cell. There is a nearly straight oblique postmedial line, with traces of a chestnut line beyond it and a dark patch between veins 3 and 4. There are also a submarginal and marginal series of black specks. The hindwings have an indistinct medial line and a submarginal and marginal series of black specks.
