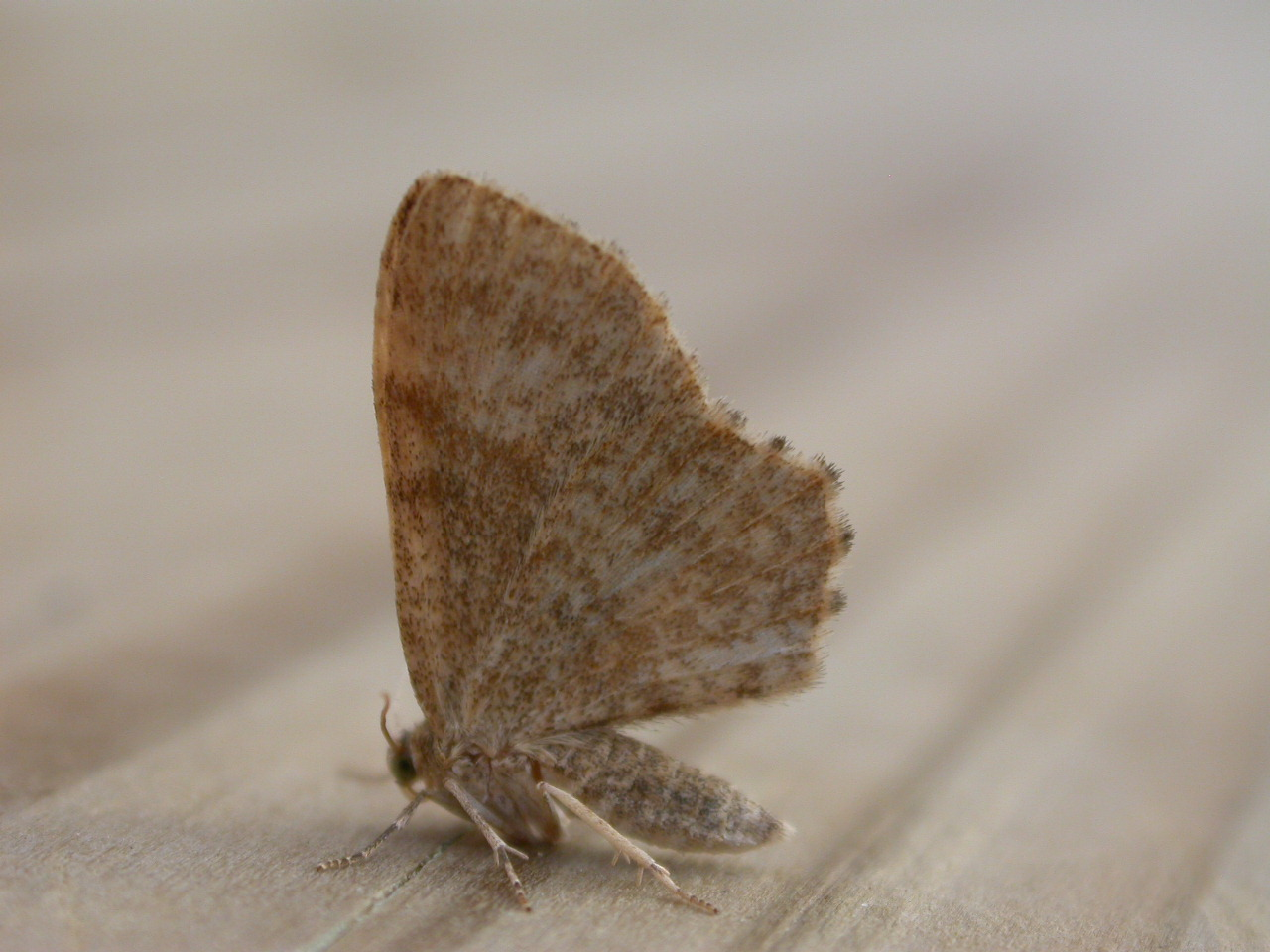

Scientific classification
- Kingdom: Animalia
- Phylum: Arthropoda
- Clade: Pancrustacea
- Class: Insecta
- Order: Lepidoptera
- Family: Geometridae
- Tribe: Asthenini
- Genus: Euchoeca; Hübner, 1823
- Species: E. nebulata

Binomial name
- Euchoeca nebulata (Scopoli, 1763)

Synonyms
- Phalaena nebulata Scopoli, 1763; Geometra hepararia Hübner, [1799]; Geometra heparata [Denis & Schiffermüller], 1775; Phalaena obliterata Hufnagel, 1767; Phalaena strigata Thunberg, 1788

= Euchoeca =

Genus of moths

Euchoeca is a monotypic moth genus in the family Geometridae erected by Jacob Hübner in 1823. Its only species, Euchoeca nebulata, the dingy shell, was described by Giovanni Antonio Scopoli in 1763. It is found in the Palearctic realm, from Europe across Russia to Japan.

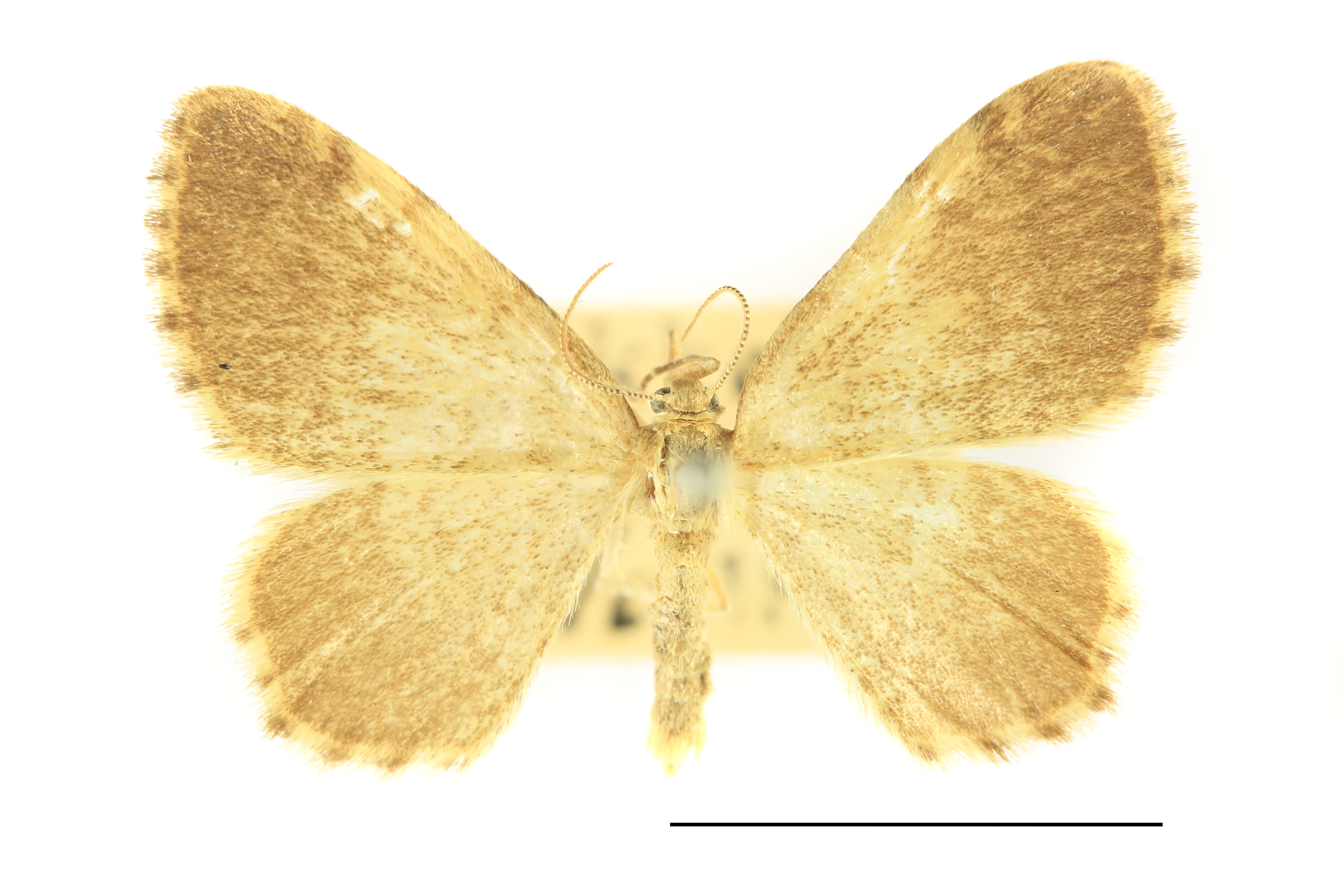

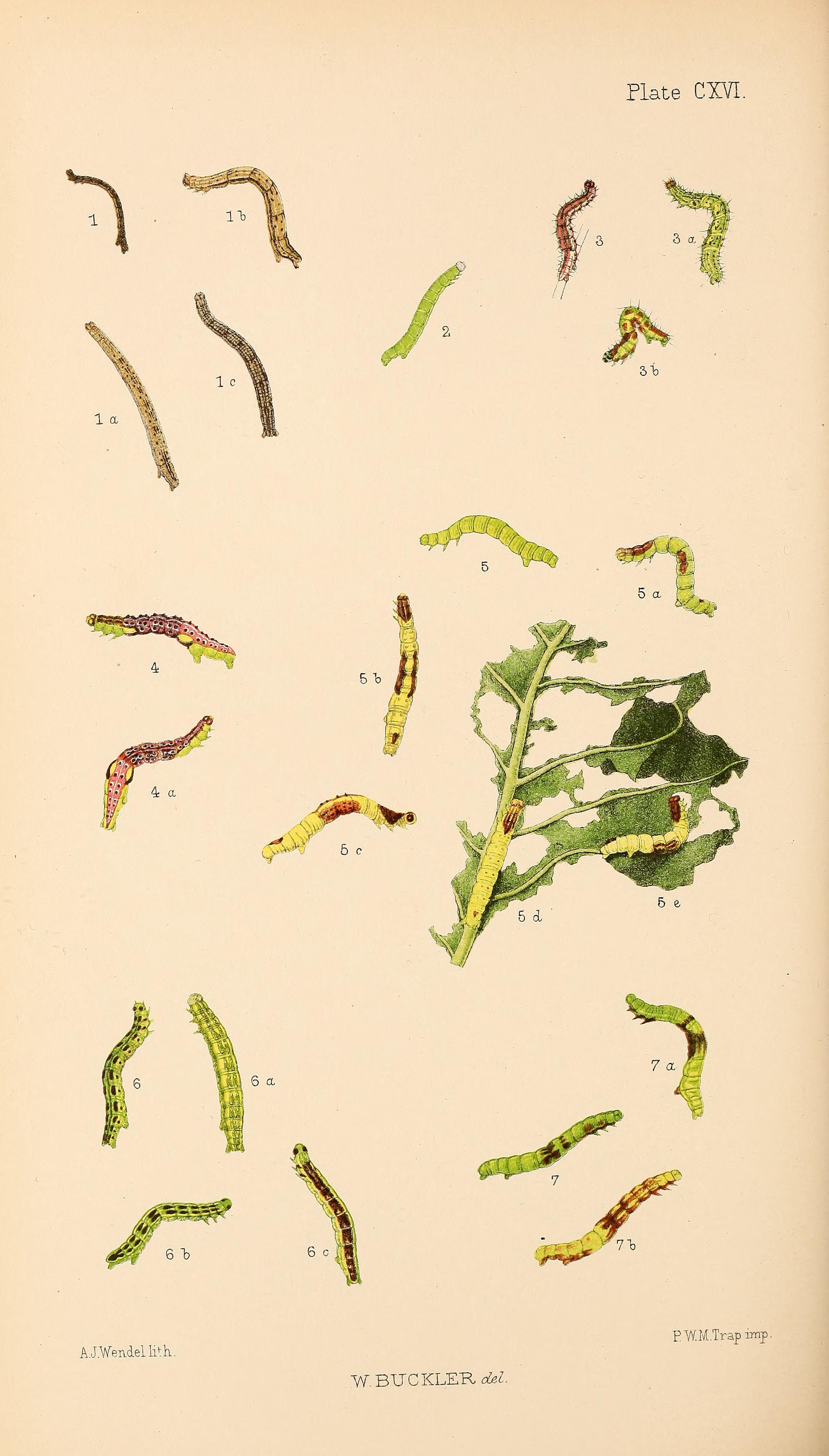
Fig 6,6a,6b,6c Larvae in various stages of growth

The wingspan is 23–25 millimetres (0.91–0.98 in). The ground colour of the forewing is sandy brown or orange cream. The wings have very fine and faint darker cross lines and creamy-brown chequered fringes. There is a double curve on the termen of the hindwing. The caterpillar is green, with three lines along the dorsum, the central one dark green, and the others yellow and a purple stripe runs along under the spiracles. In another form the general colour is greyish with a reddish-brown stripe along the back, and series of spots of the same colour along the sides.

The moth flies from April to September depending on the location.

The larvae feed on birch and alder in damp woodland, fens and other marshy areas.
