= Poecilasthena xylocyma =

Scientific classification
- Kingdom: Animalia
- Phylum: Arthropoda
- Class: Insecta
- Order: Lepidoptera
- Family: Geometridae
- Genus: Poecilasthena
- Species: P. xylocyma

Binomial name
- Poecilasthena xylocyma (Meyrick, 1891)

Synonyms
- Asthena xylocyma Meyrick, 1891

Species of moth

Poecilasthena xylocyma is a moth in the family Geometridae. It is found in Australia, where it is known from Western Australia, South Australia and Tasmania.
