= Chaetolopha pseudooxyntis =

Scientific classification
- Kingdom: Animalia
- Phylum: Arthropoda
- Clade: Pancrustacea
- Class: Insecta
- Order: Lepidoptera
- Family: Geometridae
- Genus: Chaetolopha
- Species: C. pseudooxyntis

Binomial name
- Chaetolopha pseudooxyntis Schmidt, 2002

Species of moth

Chaetolopha pseudooxyntis is a moth in the family Geometridae. It is found in Australia (Queensland).

The wingspan is about 10 millimetres (0.39 in).

The larvae probably feed on Polypodiophyta species.
