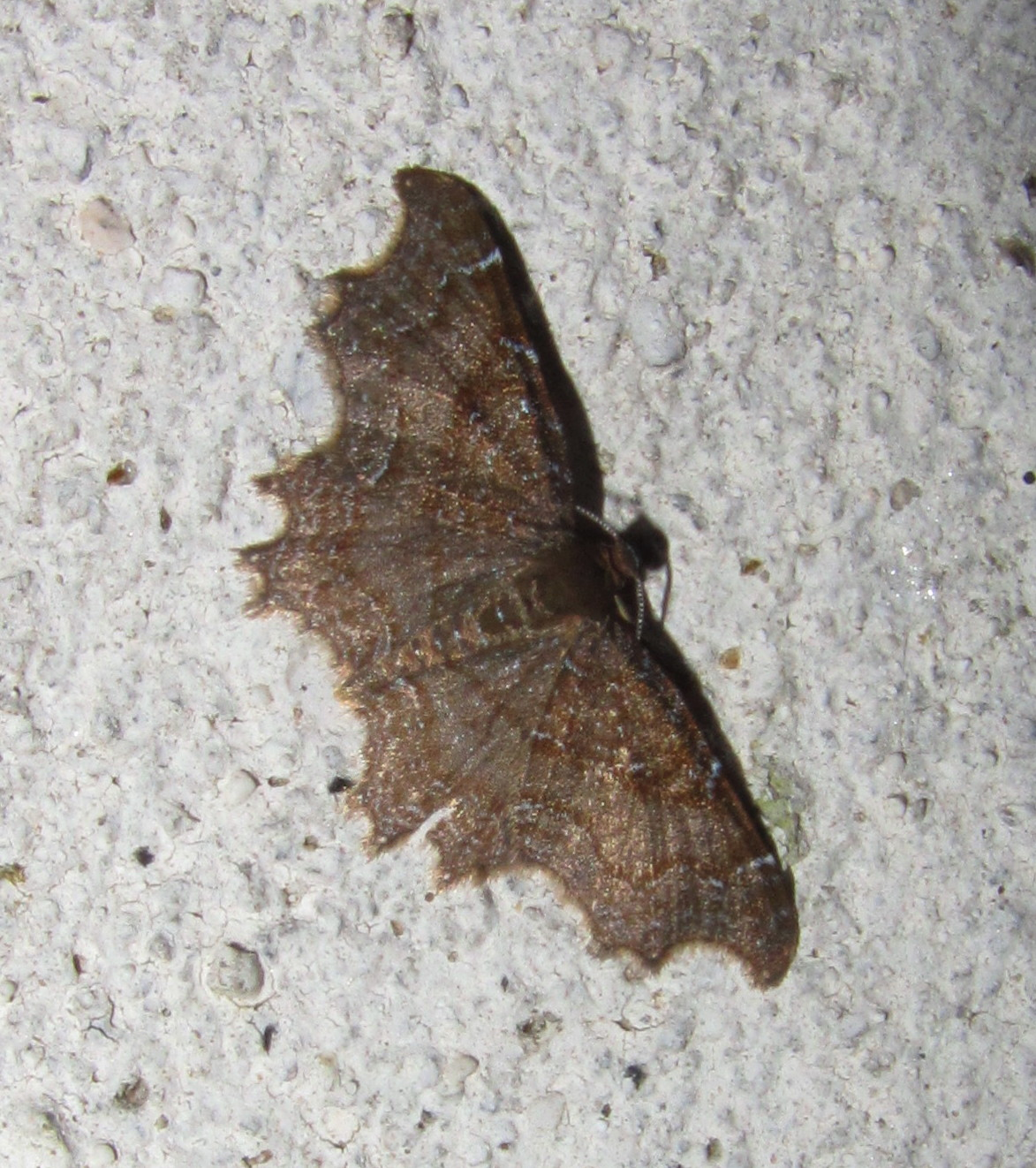

Scientific classification
- Domain: Eukaryota
- Kingdom: Animalia
- Phylum: Arthropoda
- Class: Insecta
- Order: Lepidoptera
- Family: Geometridae
- Genus: Hastina
- Species: H. subfalcaria

Binomial name
- Hastina subfalcaria (Christoph, 1881)

Synonyms
- Acidalia subfalcaria Christoph, 1881

= Hastina subfalcaria =

Species of moth

Hastina subfalcaria is a moth in the family Geometridae first described by Hugo Theodor Christoph in 1881. It is found in Japan and Russia.

The wingspan is 14–15 mm.
