= Poecilasthena limnaea =

Scientific classification
- Kingdom: Animalia
- Phylum: Arthropoda
- Clade: Pancrustacea
- Class: Insecta
- Order: Lepidoptera
- Family: Geometridae
- Genus: Poecilasthena
- Species: P. limnaea

Binomial name
- Poecilasthena limnaea Prout, 1926

Species of moth

Poecilasthena limnaea is a moth in the family Geometridae. It is found in New Guinea.

The wingspan is 23–26 mm. The fore- and hindwings are whitish, the former with olive-grey lines.
