= Hastina =

Scientific classification
- Domain: Eukaryota
- Kingdom: Animalia
- Phylum: Arthropoda
- Class: Insecta
- Order: Lepidoptera
- Family: Geometridae
- Tribe: Asthenini
- Genus: Hastina; Moore, 1888

Genus of moths

Hastina is a genus of moths in the family Geometridae.

== Species ==
- Hastina caeruleolineata Moore, 1888
- Hastina pluristrigata (Moore, 1868)
- Hastina subfalcaria (Christoph, 1881)
