= Agnibesa =

Scientific classification
- Kingdom: Animalia
- Phylum: Arthropoda
- Class: Insecta
- Order: Lepidoptera
- Family: Geometridae
- Tribe: Asthenini
- Genus: Agnibesa; Moore, 1888

Genus of geometer moths

Agnibesa is a genus of moths in the family Geometridae.

== Species ==
- Agnibesa pictaria (Moore, 1888)
- Agnibesa pleopictaria Xue, 1999
- Agnibesa plumbeolineata (Hampson, 1895)
- Agnibesa punctilinearia (Leech, 1897)
- Agnibesa recurvilineata Moore, 1888
- Agnibesa venusta Warren, 1897
