= Poecilasthena phaeodryas =

Scientific classification
- Domain: Eukaryota
- Kingdom: Animalia
- Phylum: Arthropoda
- Class: Insecta
- Order: Lepidoptera
- Family: Geometridae
- Genus: Poecilasthena
- Species: P. phaeodryas

Binomial name
- Poecilasthena phaeodryas Turner, 1931

Species of moth

Poecilasthena phaeodryas is a moth in the family Geometridae. It is found in Australia, including Queensland.
