= Poecilasthena oceanias =

Scientific classification
- Kingdom: Animalia
- Phylum: Arthropoda
- Class: Insecta
- Order: Lepidoptera
- Family: Geometridae
- Genus: Poecilasthena
- Species: P. oceanias

Binomial name
- Poecilasthena oceanias (Meyrick, 1891)

Synonyms
- Asthena oceanias Meyrick, 1891

Species of moth

Poecilasthena oceanias is a moth in the family Geometridae. It is found in Australia, including Western Australia.
