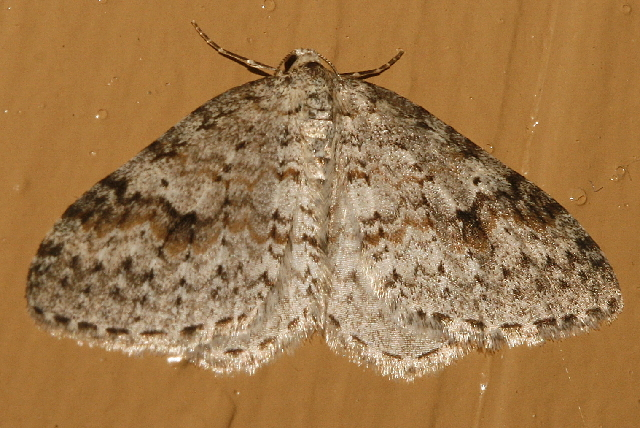

Scientific classification
- Domain: Eukaryota
- Kingdom: Animalia
- Phylum: Arthropoda
- Class: Insecta
- Order: Lepidoptera
- Family: Geometridae
- Genus: Nomenia
- Species: N. obsoleta

Binomial name
- Nomenia obsoleta Swett, 1916

Synonyms
- Venusia obsoleta Swett, 1916

= Nomenia obsoleta =

Species of moth

Nomenia obsoleta is a moth in the family Geometridae first described by Louis W. Swett in 1916. It is found in western North America, from British Columbia, through Washington and Oregon to California.

The wingspan is about 20 mm.
