= Poecilasthena glaucosa =

Scientific classification
- Domain: Eukaryota
- Kingdom: Animalia
- Phylum: Arthropoda
- Class: Insecta
- Order: Lepidoptera
- Family: Geometridae
- Genus: Poecilasthena
- Species: P. glaucosa

Binomial name
- Poecilasthena glaucosa (Lucas, 1888)

Synonyms
- Jodis glaucosa Lucas 1888; Euchloris microgyna Lower, 1894

Species of moth

Poecilasthena glaucosa is a moth in the family Geometridae. It is found in Australia, including Queensland.
