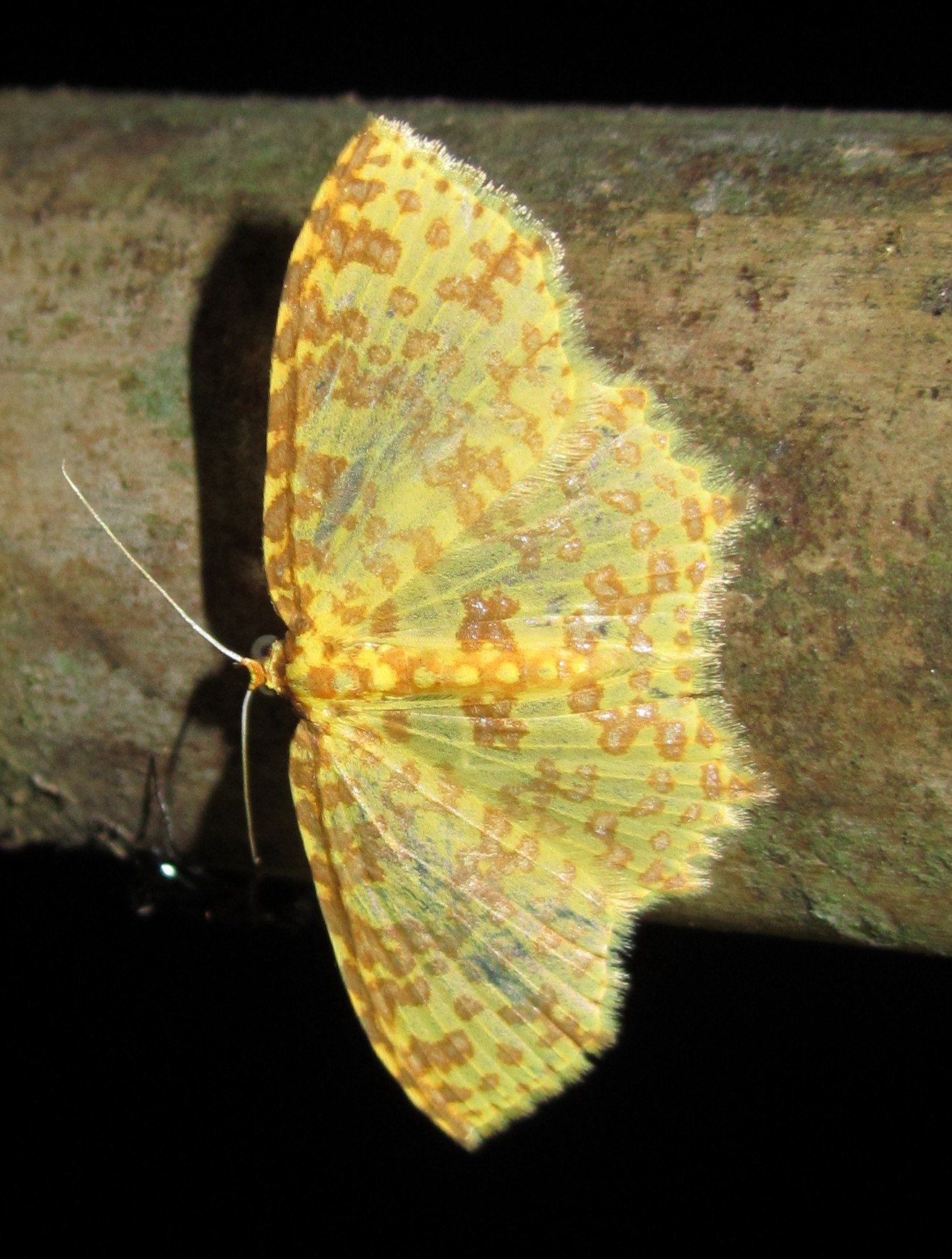

Scientific classification
- Domain: Eukaryota
- Kingdom: Animalia
- Phylum: Arthropoda
- Class: Insecta
- Order: Lepidoptera
- Family: Geometridae
- Tribe: Asthenini
- Genus: Polynesia; Swinhoe, 1892

Synonyms
- Placotome Warren, 1894

= Polynesia (moth) =

Genus of moths

Polynesia is a genus of moths in the family Geometridae. Species are found throughout India, Sri Lanka and Andaman Islands.

== Description ==
Palpi slender, obliquely upturned, and reaching vertex of head. Antennae of male minutely ciliated. Hind tibia of male with a terminal pair of small spurs. Female with two pairs of spurs. Forewings with vein 3 from close to angle of cell. Vein 6 from or from above angle of cell. Veins 7,8,9,10 and 11 stalked from upper angle, or with a minute areole at their base. Hindwings with the outer margin produced to points at veins 7 and 4. The cell very short. Veins 3,4 and 6,7 on long stalks. Vein 5 from above middle of discocellulars. Vein 8 form close to end of cell, and then much curved.

== Species ==
- Polynesia curtitibia Prout, 1922
- Polynesia sunandava (Walker, 1861)
- Polynesia truncapex Swinhoe, 1892
