= Anydrelia plicataria =

Scientific classification
- Domain: Eukaryota
- Kingdom: Animalia
- Phylum: Arthropoda
- Class: Insecta
- Order: Lepidoptera
- Family: Geometridae
- Genus: Anydrelia
- Species: A. plicataria

Binomial name
- Anydrelia plicataria (Leech, 1897)

Synonyms
- Brabira plicataria Leech, 1897

Species of moth

Anydrelia plicataria is a moth in the family Geometridae. It is found in China.
