= Poecilasthena nubivaga =

Scientific classification
- Kingdom: Animalia
- Phylum: Arthropoda
- Clade: Pancrustacea
- Class: Insecta
- Order: Lepidoptera
- Family: Geometridae
- Genus: Poecilasthena
- Species: P. nubivaga

Binomial name
- Poecilasthena nubivaga Prout, 1932

Species of moth

Poecilasthena nubivaga is a moth in the family Geometridae. The species was described by Prout in 1932. It is found on Borneo.
