= Poecilasthena character =

Scientific classification
- Kingdom: Animalia
- Phylum: Arthropoda
- Clade: Pancrustacea
- Class: Insecta
- Order: Lepidoptera
- Family: Geometridae
- Genus: Poecilasthena
- Species: P. character

Binomial name
- Poecilasthena character Prout, 1932

Species of moth

Poecilasthena character is a moth in the family Geometridae. It is found on Borneo, Peninsular Malaysia and Sumatra.

Adults are white with green fasciation.
