= Parachaetolopha flavicorpus =

Scientific classification
- Domain: Eukaryota
- Kingdom: Animalia
- Phylum: Arthropoda
- Class: Insecta
- Order: Lepidoptera
- Family: Geometridae
- Genus: Parachaetolopha
- Species: P. flavicorpus

Binomial name
- Parachaetolopha flavicorpus (Warren, 1906)

Synonyms
- Tephroclystia flavicorpus Warren, 1906; Chaetolopha flavicorpus

Species of moth

Parachaetolopha flavicorpus is a moth in the family Geometridae first described by William Warren in 1906. It is found in Papua New Guinea.
