= Chaetolopha leucophragma =

Scientific classification
- Kingdom: Animalia
- Phylum: Arthropoda
- Class: Insecta
- Order: Lepidoptera
- Family: Geometridae
- Genus: Chaetolopha
- Species: C. leucophragma

Binomial name
- Chaetolopha leucophragma (Meyrick, 1891)

Synonyms
- Scordylia leucophragma Meyrick, 1891

Species of moth

Chaetolopha leucophragma is a moth in the family Geometridae. It is found in Australia (Queensland, New South Wales, Victoria and Tasmania).

The larvae probably feed on Polypodiophyta species.
