= Agnibesa pictaria =

Scientific classification
- Domain: Eukaryota
- Kingdom: Animalia
- Phylum: Arthropoda
- Class: Insecta
- Order: Lepidoptera
- Family: Geometridae
- Genus: Agnibesa
- Species: A. pictaria

Binomial name
- Agnibesa pictaria (Moore, 1888)

Synonyms
- Somatina pictaria Moore, 1888; Agnibesa brevibasis Prout, 1938

Species of moth

Agnibesa pictaria is a moth in the family Geometridae first described by Frederic Moore in 1888. It is found in India, Nepal and China.

== Subspecies ==
- Agnibesa pictaria pictaria (India, Nepal, China: Tibet)
- Agnibesa pictaria brevibasis Prout, 1938 (China: Shanxi, Gansu, Sichuan, Yunnan, Tibet)
