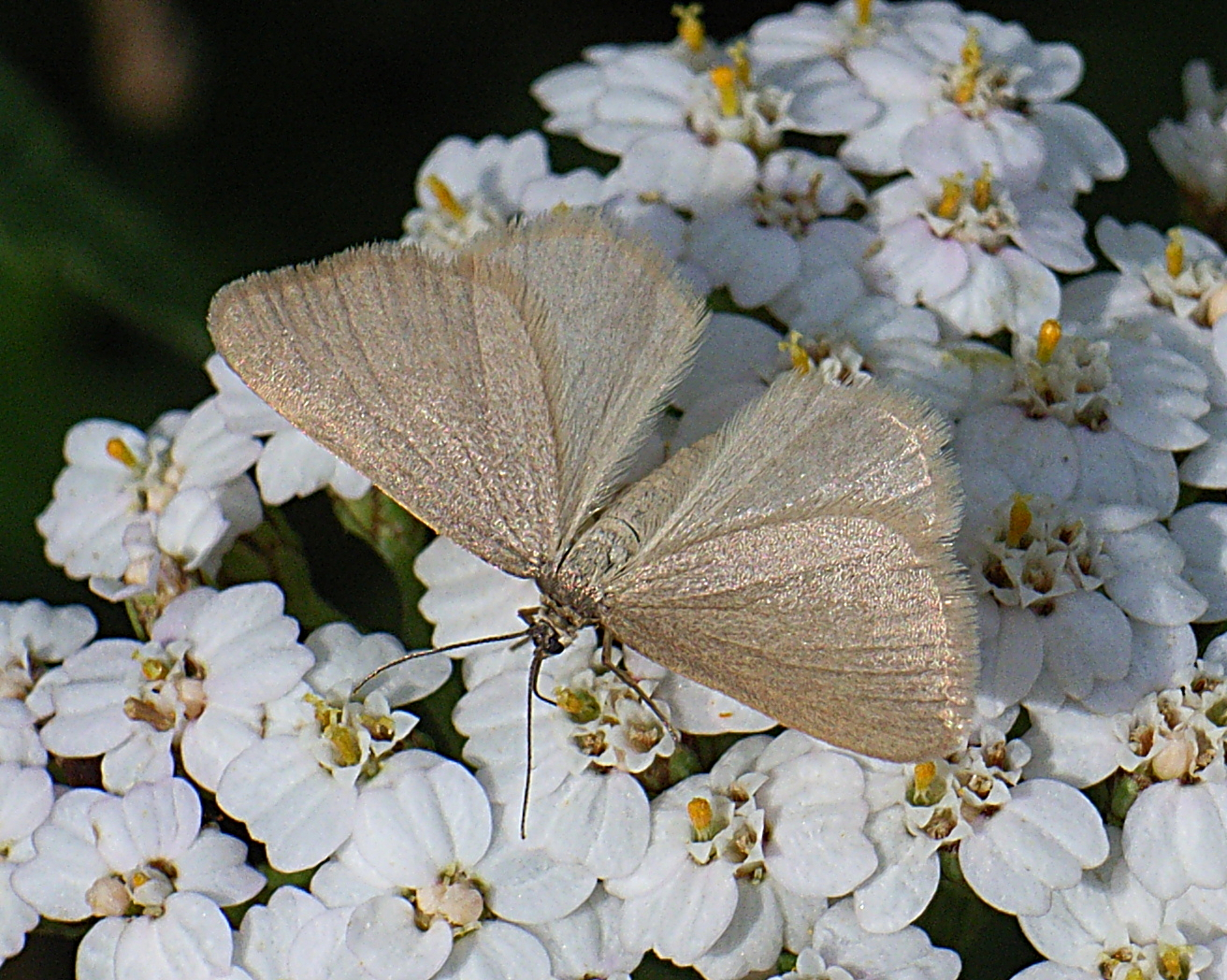

Scientific classification
- Kingdom: Animalia
- Phylum: Arthropoda
- Clade: Pancrustacea
- Class: Insecta
- Order: Lepidoptera
- Family: Geometridae
- Genus: Minoa
- Species: M. murinata

Binomial name
- Minoa murinata (Scopoli, 1763)

Synonyms
- Phalaena murinata Scopoli, 1763; Minoa cyparissaria Mann, 1854; Geometra euphorbiata Denis & Schiffermüller, 1775; Phalaena fuscata Hufnagel, 1767; Acidalia italicata Milliere, 1885; Minoa monochroaria Herrich-Schäffer, 1848; Phalaena sordiata Linnaeus, 1767; Phalaena unicolorata Hubner, 1787

= Minoa murinata =

Species of moth

Minoa murinata, the drab looper, is a moth of the family Geometridae. The species was first described by Giovanni Antonio Scopoli in his 1763 Entomologia Carniolica. It can be found in southern and central Europe, Great Britain, Anatolia, the Caucasus and the mountains of central Asia and Mongolia.

The wingspan is 14–18 mm. The length of the forewings is 9–11 mm. The moths fly from June to August depending on the location.

The larvae feed on cypress spurge and wood spurge.

== Subspecies ==
- Minoa murinata murinata (Europe, Russia, Asia Minor, Central Asia)
- Minoa murinata amylaria Prout, 1914 (Alps, Italy)
- Minoa murinata limburgia Lempke, 1969 (Netherlands)
- Minoa murinata lutea Schwingenschuss, 1954 (Russia)
