= Polynesia truncapex =

Scientific classification
- Domain: Eukaryota
- Kingdom: Animalia
- Phylum: Arthropoda
- Class: Insecta
- Order: Lepidoptera
- Family: Geometridae
- Genus: Polynesia
- Species: P. truncapex

Binomial name
- Polynesia truncapex C. Swinhoe, 1892

Synonyms
- Placotome truncapex

Species of moth

Polynesia truncapex is a moth in the family Geometridae first described by Charles Swinhoe in 1892.

== Distribution ==
It is found in the north-eastern Himalayas and on Peninsular Malaysia and Bali.
