= Poecilasthena sthenommata =

Scientific classification
- Domain: Eukaryota
- Kingdom: Animalia
- Phylum: Arthropoda
- Class: Insecta
- Order: Lepidoptera
- Family: Geometridae
- Genus: Poecilasthena
- Species: P. sthenommata

Binomial name
- Poecilasthena sthenommata Turner, 1922

Species of moth

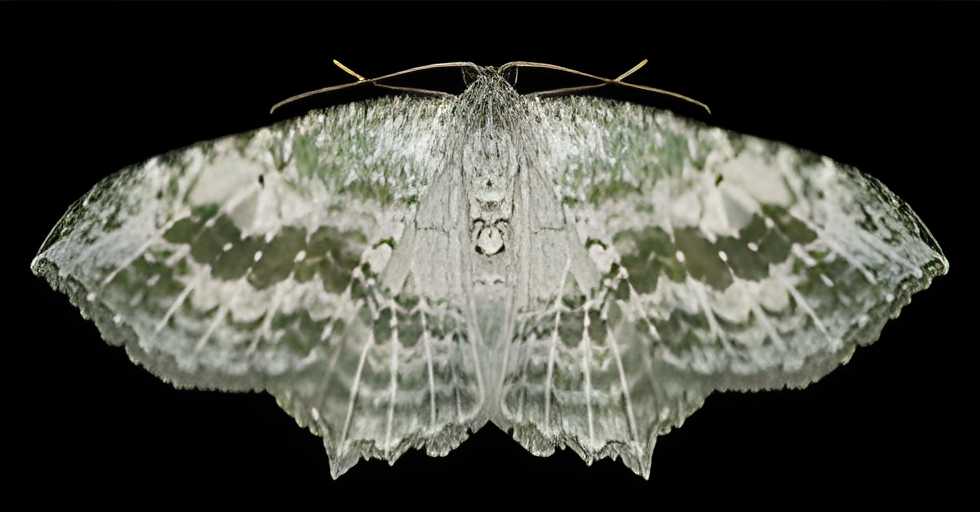
Top down view of Poecilasthena Sthenommata.

Poecilasthena sthenommata is a moth in the family Geometridae. It is found in Australia, where it is known from Queensland and New South Wales.
