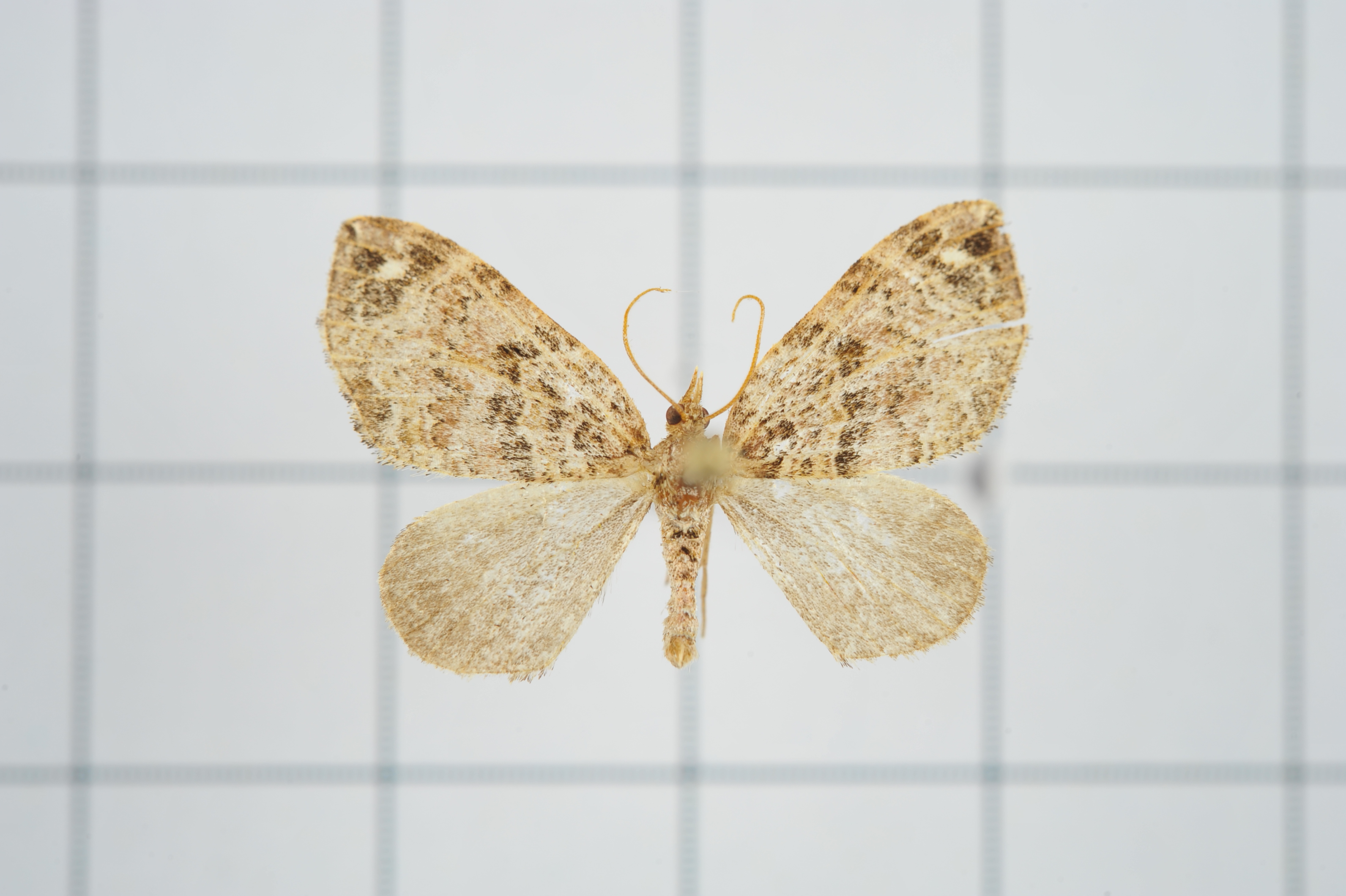

Scientific classification
- Kingdom: Animalia
- Phylum: Arthropoda
- Class: Insecta
- Order: Lepidoptera
- Family: Geometridae
- Genus: Chaetolopha
- Species: C. incurvata

Binomial name
- Chaetolopha incurvata (Moore, 1888)

Synonyms
- Eupithecia incurvata Moore, 1888

= Chaetolopha incurvata =

Species of moth

Chaetolopha incurvata is a moth in the family Geometridae. It is found in India and Taiwan.
