= Poecilasthena fragilis =

Scientific classification
- Domain: Eukaryota
- Kingdom: Animalia
- Phylum: Arthropoda
- Class: Insecta
- Order: Lepidoptera
- Family: Geometridae
- Genus: Poecilasthena
- Species: P. fragilis

Binomial name
- Poecilasthena fragilis Turner, 1942

Species of moth

Poecilasthena fragilis is a moth in the family Geometridae. It is found in Australia, including New South Wales, Victoria and Tasmania.
