= Macrohastina azela =

Scientific classification
- Domain: Eukaryota
- Kingdom: Animalia
- Phylum: Arthropoda
- Class: Insecta
- Order: Lepidoptera
- Family: Geometridae
- Genus: Macrohastina
- Species: M. azela

Binomial name
- Macrohastina azela (Butler, 1878)

Synonyms
- Erosia azela Butler, 1878

Species of moth

Macrohastina azela is a moth in the family Geometridae first described by Arthur Gardiner Butler in 1878. It is found in Japan.

The wingspan is 18–21 mm.
