= Poecilasthena prouti =

Scientific classification
- Domain: Eukaryota
- Kingdom: Animalia
- Phylum: Arthropoda
- Class: Insecta
- Order: Lepidoptera
- Family: Geometridae
- Genus: Poecilasthena
- Species: P. prouti

Binomial name
- Poecilasthena prouti West, 1929

Species of moth

Poecilasthena prouti is a moth in the family Geometridae. It is found in the Philippines (Luzon).
