= Poecilasthena iopolia =

Scientific classification
- Domain: Eukaryota
- Kingdom: Animalia
- Phylum: Arthropoda
- Class: Insecta
- Order: Lepidoptera
- Family: Geometridae
- Genus: Poecilasthena
- Species: P. iopolia

Binomial name
- Poecilasthena iopolia (Turner, 1926)

Synonyms
- Eccymatoge iopolia Turner, 1926

Species of moth

Poecilasthena iopolia is a moth in the family Geometridae. It is found in Australia, including Tasmania.
