= Agnibesa recurvilineata =

Scientific classification
- Domain: Eukaryota
- Kingdom: Animalia
- Phylum: Arthropoda
- Class: Insecta
- Order: Lepidoptera
- Family: Geometridae
- Genus: Agnibesa
- Species: A. recurvilineata

Binomial name
- Agnibesa recurvilineata Moore, 1888

Species of moth

Agnibesa recurvilineata is a moth in the family Geometridae first described by Frederic Moore in 1888. It is found in Darjeeling in India, in western China and Nepal.

== Subspecies ==
- Agnibesa recurvilineata recurvilineata (Nepal, India)
- Agnibesa recurvilineata meroplyta Prout, 1938 (China)
