= Parachaetolopha peregrina =

Scientific classification
- Kingdom: Animalia
- Phylum: Arthropoda
- Clade: Pancrustacea
- Class: Insecta
- Order: Lepidoptera
- Family: Geometridae
- Genus: Parachaetolopha
- Species: P. peregrina

Binomial name
- Parachaetolopha peregrina (Prout, 1929)

Synonyms
- Chaetolopha peregrina Prout, 1929

Species of moth

Parachaetolopha peregrina is a moth in the family Geometridae. It is found in Papua New Guinea.
