= Agnibesa pleopictaria =

Scientific classification
- Kingdom: Animalia
- Phylum: Arthropoda
- Clade: Pancrustacea
- Class: Insecta
- Order: Lepidoptera
- Family: Geometridae
- Genus: Agnibesa
- Species: A. pleopictaria

Binomial name
- Agnibesa pleopictaria Xue, 1999

Species of moth

Agnibesa pleopictaria is a moth in the family Geometridae. It was described by Dayong Xue in 1999. It is found in China.
