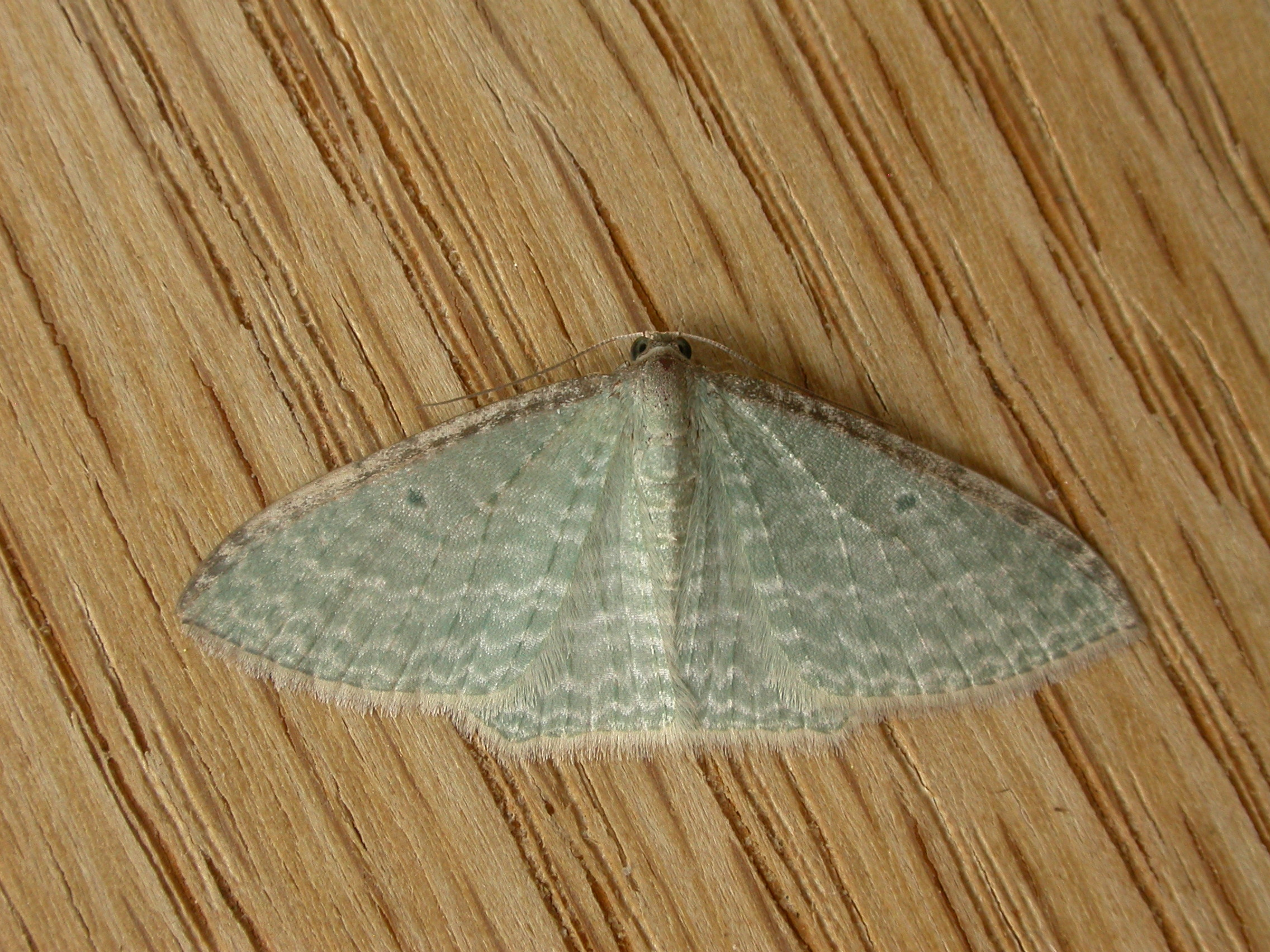

Scientific classification
- Domain: Eukaryota
- Kingdom: Animalia
- Phylum: Arthropoda
- Class: Insecta
- Order: Lepidoptera
- Family: Geometridae
- Genus: Poecilasthena
- Species: P. pulchraria

Binomial name
- Poecilasthena pulchraria (Doubleday, 1843)

Synonyms
- Acidalia pulchraria Doubleday, 1843; Asthena ondinata Guenée, 1857; Asthena pulchraria (Doubleday, 1843); Chlorochroma plurilineata Walker, 1861; Asthena decolor Turner, 1904

= Poecilasthena pulchraria =

Species of moth

Poecilasthena pulchraria is a moth of the family Geometridae. It is found in Australia and New Zealand. It was first described by Edward Doubleday in 1843 and named Acidalia pulchraria.

The green looping caterpillars feed on the flowers, developing fruits and older foliage of Astroloma species in Australia and on Leucopogon fasciculatus in New Zealand.
