= Palpoctenidia =

Scientific classification
- Kingdom: Animalia
- Phylum: Arthropoda
- Clade: Pancrustacea
- Class: Insecta
- Order: Lepidoptera
- Family: Geometridae
- Tribe: Asthenini
- Genus: Palpoctenidia; Prout, 1930
- Species: P. phoenicosoma

Binomial name
- Palpoctenidia phoenicosoma (Swinhoe, 1895)

Synonyms
- Chrysocraspeda phoenicosoma Swinhoe, 1895

Genus of moths

Palpoctenidia is a monotypic moth genus in the family Geometridae described by Prout in 1930. Its only species, Palpoctenidia phoenicosoma, was first described by Charles Swinhoe in 1895. It is found in China, Japan and India.

== Subspecies ==
- Palpoctenidia phoenicosoma phoenicosoma (India, China)
- Palpoctenidia phoenicosoma semilauta Prout, 1938 (Japan)
