= Poecilasthena burmensis =

Scientific classification
- Kingdom: Animalia
- Phylum: Arthropoda
- Clade: Pancrustacea
- Class: Insecta
- Order: Lepidoptera
- Family: Geometridae
- Genus: Poecilasthena
- Species: P. burmensis

Binomial name
- Poecilasthena burmensis Prout, 1926

Species of moth

Poecilasthena burmensis is a moth in the family Geometridae that is found in Burma.
