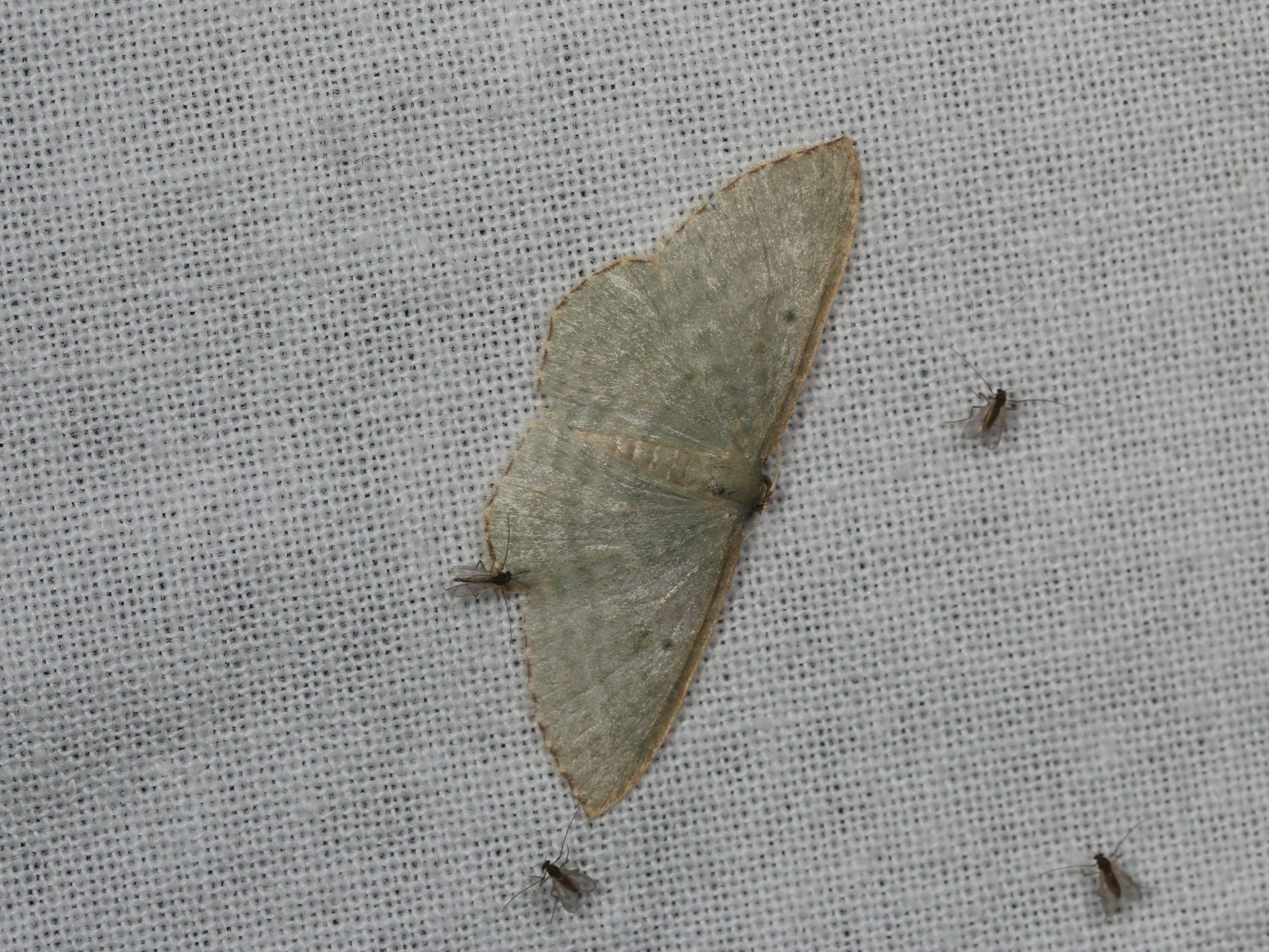

Scientific classification
- Domain: Eukaryota
- Kingdom: Animalia
- Phylum: Arthropoda
- Class: Insecta
- Order: Lepidoptera
- Family: Geometridae
- Genus: Poecilasthena
- Species: P. balioloma

Binomial name
- Poecilasthena balioloma (Turner, 1907)

Synonyms
- Asthena balioloma Turner, 1907

= Poecilasthena balioloma =

Species of moth

Poecilasthena balioloma is a moth of the family Geometridae first described by Alfred Jefferis Turner in 1907. It is found in Australia, including Tasmania.
