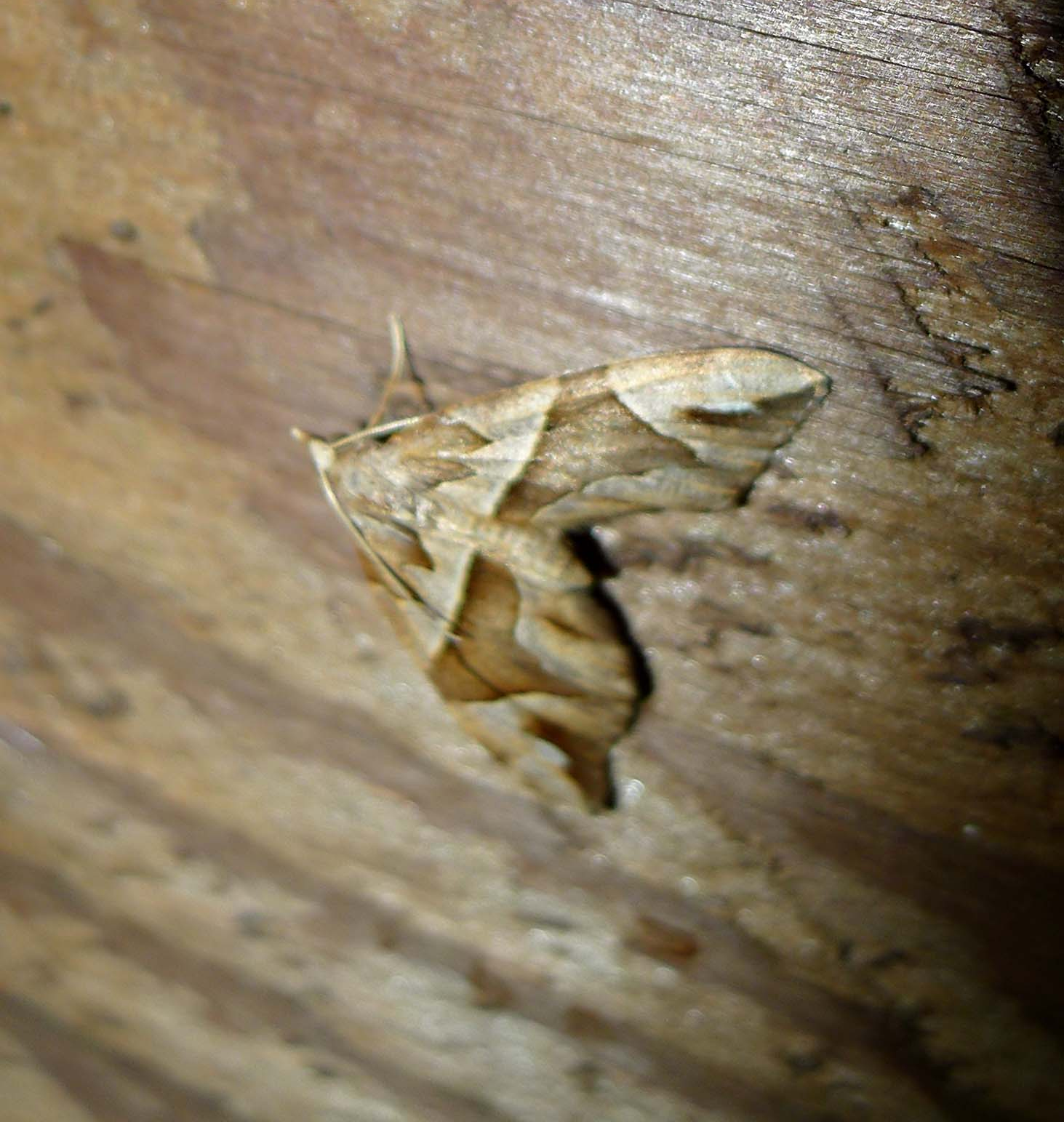

Scientific classification
- Kingdom: Animalia
- Phylum: Arthropoda
- Class: Insecta
- Order: Lepidoptera
- Family: Geometridae
- Genus: Chaetolopha
- Species: C. oxyntis

Binomial name
- Chaetolopha oxyntis (Meyrick, 1891)

Synonyms
- Scordylia oxyntis Meyrick, 1891

= Chaetolopha oxyntis =

Species of moth

Chaetolopha oxyntis is a moth in the family Geometridae. It is found in Australia (Queensland, New South Wales and Victoria).

The wingspan is about 40 mm.

The larvae probably feed on Polypodiophyta species.
