= Leucoctenorrhoe =

Scientific classification
- Domain: Eukaryota
- Kingdom: Animalia
- Phylum: Arthropoda
- Class: Insecta
- Order: Lepidoptera
- Family: Geometridae
- Tribe: Asthenini
- Genus: Leucoctenorrhoe; Warren, 1904
- Species: L. quadrilinea

Binomial name
- Leucoctenorrhoe quadrilinea Warren, 1904

Genus of moths

Leucoctenorrhoe is a monotypic moth genus in the family Geometridae. Its only species, Leucoctenorrhoe quadrilinea, is found in Peru. Both the genus and species were described by Warren in 1904.
