= Hastina caeruleolineata =

Scientific classification
- Domain: Eukaryota
- Kingdom: Animalia
- Phylum: Arthropoda
- Class: Insecta
- Order: Lepidoptera
- Family: Geometridae
- Genus: Hastina
- Species: H. caeruleolineata

Binomial name
- Hastina caeruleolineata Moore, 1888

Species of moth

Hastina caeruleolineata is a moth in the family Geometridae first described by Frederic Moore in 1888. It is found in Myanmar, China and India.
