= Hastina pluristrigata =

Scientific classification
- Domain: Eukaryota
- Kingdom: Animalia
- Phylum: Arthropoda
- Class: Insecta
- Order: Lepidoptera
- Family: Geometridae
- Genus: Hastina
- Species: H. pluristrigata

Binomial name
- Hastina pluristrigata (Moore, 1868)

Synonyms
- Hyria pluristrigata Moore, 1868

Species of moth

Hastina pluristrigata is a moth in the family Geometridae first described by Frederic Moore in 1868. It is found in China and India.
