= Agnibesa venusta =

Scientific classification
- Kingdom: Animalia
- Phylum: Arthropoda
- Class: Insecta
- Order: Lepidoptera
- Family: Geometridae
- Genus: Agnibesa
- Species: A. venusta

Binomial name
- Agnibesa venusta Warren, 1897

Species of moth

Agnibesa venusta is a moth in the family Geometridae first described by William Warren in 1897. It is found in Sikkim in India, Nepal and China.
