= Agnibesa plumbeolineata =

Scientific classification
- Kingdom: Animalia
- Phylum: Arthropoda
- Class: Insecta
- Order: Lepidoptera
- Family: Geometridae
- Genus: Agnibesa
- Species: A. plumbeolineata

Binomial name
- Agnibesa plumbeolineata (Hampson, 1895)

Synonyms
- Hydrelia plumbeolineata Hampson, 1895

Species of moth

Agnibesa plumbeolineata is a moth in the family Geometridae first described by George Hampson in 1895. It is found in Sikkim in India and in China.
