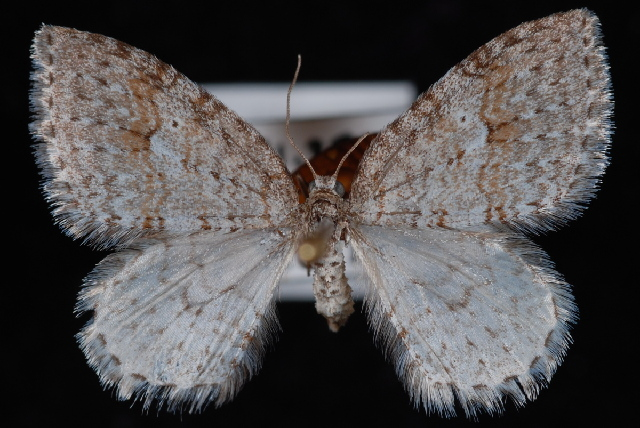
- Preserved specimen of Nomenia duodecemlineata

Scientific classification
- Domain: Eukaryota
- Kingdom: Animalia
- Phylum: Arthropoda
- Class: Insecta
- Order: Lepidoptera
- Family: Geometridae
- Tribe: Asthenini
- Genus: Nomenia; Pearsall, 1905

= Nomenia =

Genus of moths

Nomenia is a genus of moths in the family Geometridae erected by Richard F. Pearsall in 1905. The genus was previously treated as a junior synonym of Venusia, but then later restored as valid.

== Species ==
- Nomenia duodecimlineata (Packard, 1873)
- Nomenia obsoleta Swett, 1916
