= Parasthena =

Scientific classification
- Domain: Eukaryota
- Kingdom: Animalia
- Phylum: Arthropoda
- Class: Insecta
- Order: Lepidoptera
- Family: Geometridae
- Tribe: Asthenini
- Genus: Parasthena; Warren, 1902
- Species: P. flexilinea

Binomial name
- Parasthena flexilinea Warren, 1902

Synonyms
- Hydrelia flexilinea

Genus of moths

Parasthena is a monotypic moth genus in the family Geometridae. Its only species, Parasthena flexilinea, is found on Sulawesi, in the Philippines and Borneo and possibly on Seram and Papua New Guinea. Both the genus and species were first described by Warren in 1902.

The ground colour of the wings is pale grey-brown with fine grey-brown fasciation and black discal spots.
