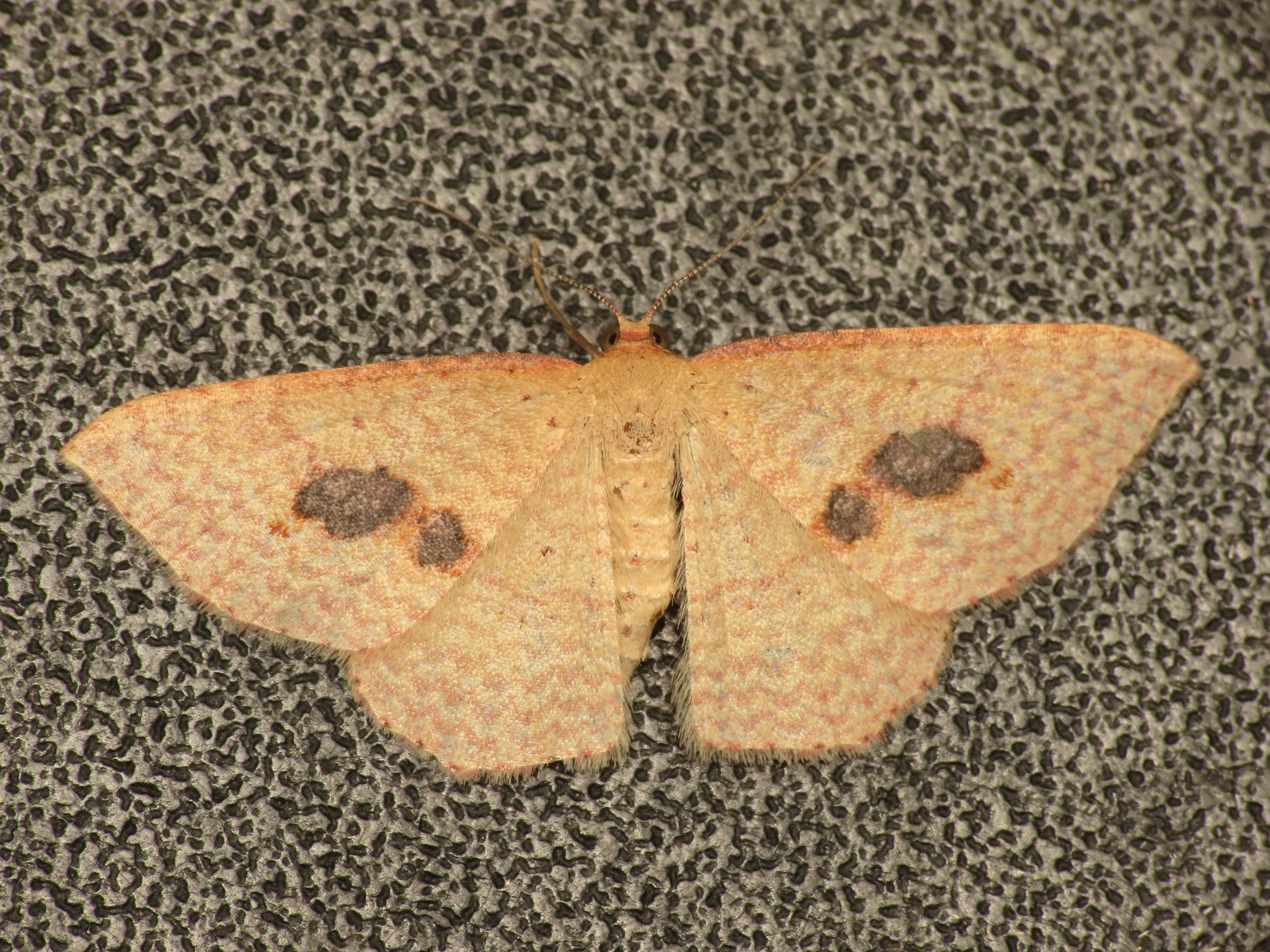

Scientific classification
- Kingdom: Animalia
- Phylum: Arthropoda
- Clade: Pancrustacea
- Class: Insecta
- Order: Lepidoptera
- Family: Geometridae
- Tribe: Asthenini
- Genus: Epicyme; Meyrick, 1885
- Species: E. rubropunctaria

Binomial name
- Epicyme rubropunctaria (Doubleday, 1843)

Synonyms
- Generic; Hippolyte Meyrick, 1883; Specific; Ptychopoda rubropunctaria Doubleday, 1843; Asthena risata Guenée, 1857; Asthena mullata Guenée, 1868; Asthena vexata Walker, 1869; Euchoca rubropunctaria (Doubleday, 1843)

= Epicyme =

Genus of moths

Epicyme is a monotypic moth genus in the family Geometridae described by Edward Meyrick in 1885. Its only species, Epicyme rubropunctaria, the red-spotted delicate, described by Edward Doubleday in 1843, is found in New Zealand, the Australian Capital Territory, Tasmania and Victoria.

The wingspan is about 25 mm.

The larvae have been recorded feeding on plants in the genera Haloragis, Gaultheria and Geranium.
