= Chalyboclydon =

Scientific classification
- Kingdom: Animalia
- Phylum: Arthropoda
- Class: Insecta
- Order: Lepidoptera
- Family: Geometridae
- Subfamily: Larentiinae
- Genus: Chalyboclydon; Warren, 1893

Genus of moths

Chalyboclydon is a genus of moths in the family Geometridae.

== Species ==
- Chalyboclydon flexilinea Warren, 1898
- Chalyboclydon marginata Warren, 1893
