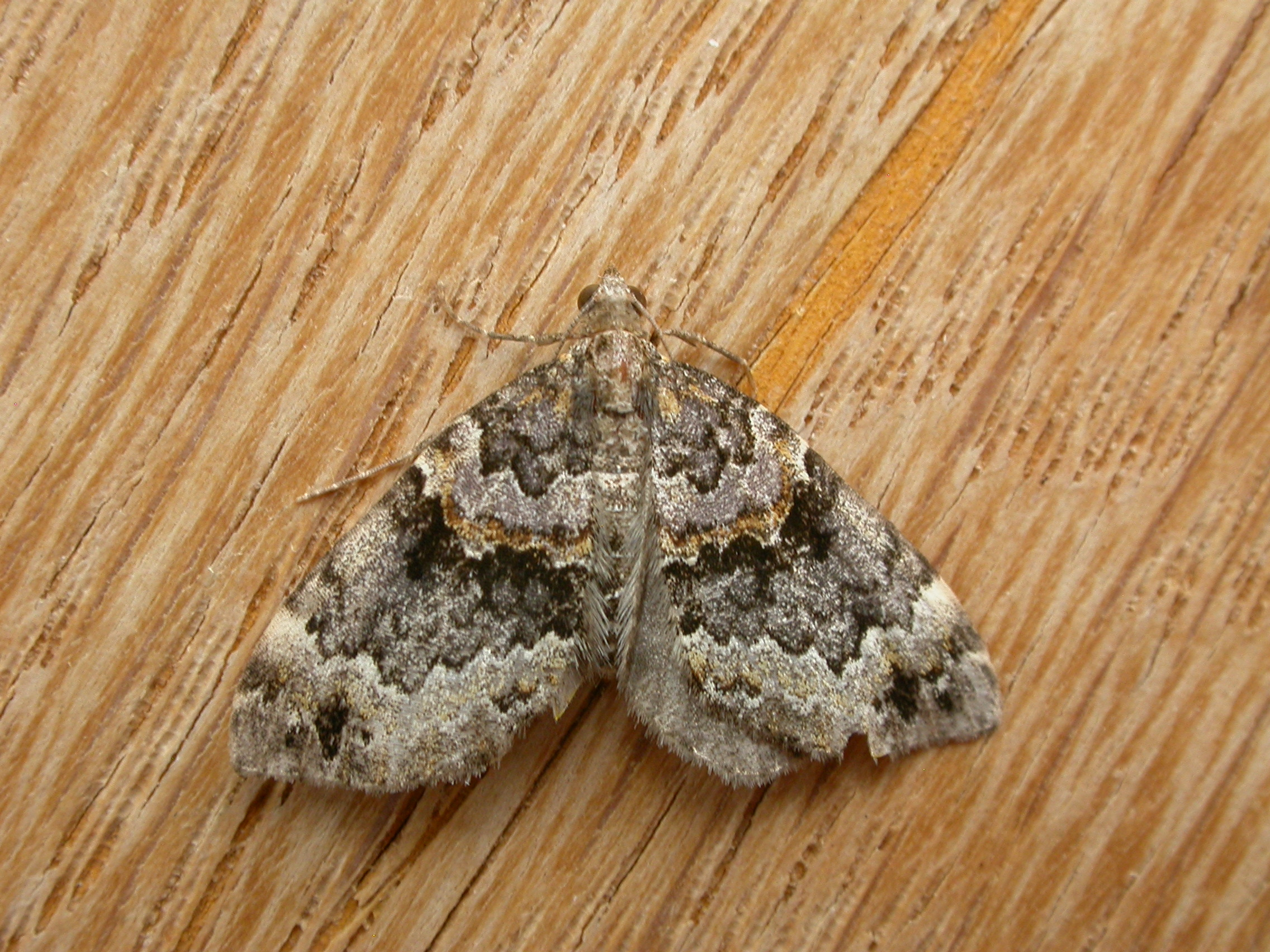
- Chaetolopha decipiens

Scientific classification
- Domain: Eukaryota
- Kingdom: Animalia
- Phylum: Arthropoda
- Class: Insecta
- Order: Lepidoptera
- Family: Geometridae
- Subfamily: Larentiinae
- Genus: Chaetolopha; Warren, 1899

= Chaetolopha =

Genus of moths

Chaetolopha is a genus of moths in the family Geometridae. Most species are endemic to Australia. A number of species previously assigned to this genus, were reassigned to the new genus Parachaetolopha in 2002.

== Species ==
- Chaetolopha decipiens (Butler, 1886)
- Chaetolopha emporias (Turner, 1904)
- Chaetolopha incurvata (Moore, 1888)
- Chaetolopha leucophragma (Meyrick, 1891)
- Chaetolopha niphosticha (Turner, 1907)
- Chaetolopha oxyntis (Meyrick, 1891)
- Chaetolopha pseudooxyntis Schmidt, 2002
