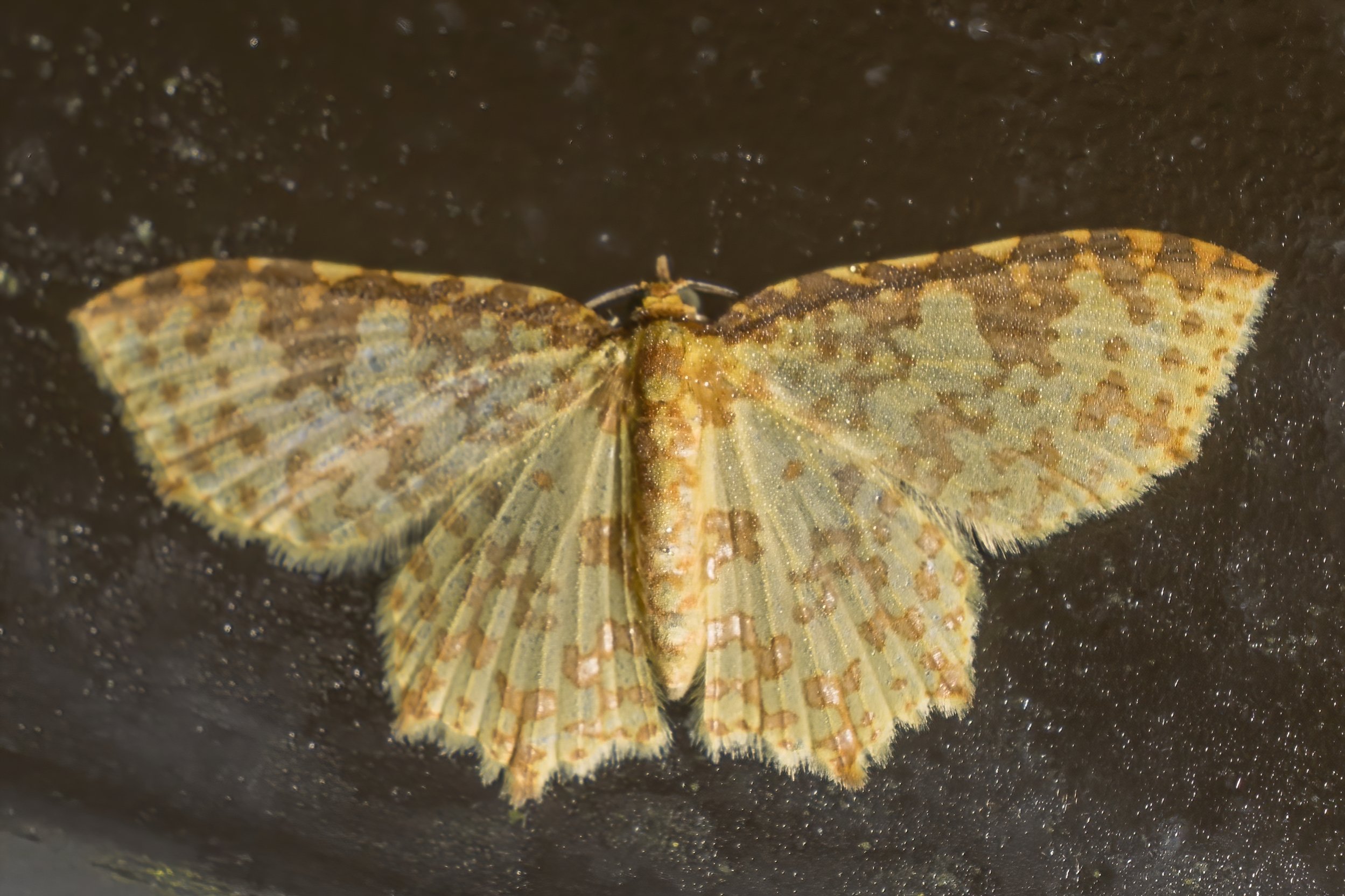
- in Sri Lanka

Scientific classification
- Kingdom: Animalia
- Phylum: Arthropoda
- Class: Insecta
- Order: Lepidoptera
- Family: Geometridae
- Genus: Polynesia
- Species: P. sunandava

Binomial name
- Polynesia sunandava (Walker, 1861)

Synonyms
- Pomasia sunandava Walker, 1861; Cambogia aeriferata Walker, 1863

= Polynesia sunandava =

Species of moth

Polynesia sunandava is a moth in the family Geometridae. It is found in Sri Lanka and India, as well as on Peninsular Malaysia, Sumbawa, Larat (part of the Tanimbar Islands) and in New Guinea.

== Description ==
Its wingspan is about 26 mm. Forewings with non-truncate apex. Body bright yellow. Head marked with rufous. Shaft of antennae whitish. Tegulae with rufous patches irrorated with silvery scales. Wings with rufous-edged silver spots in very ill-defined series, those below the costa of forewings forming a very ill-defined fascia.
