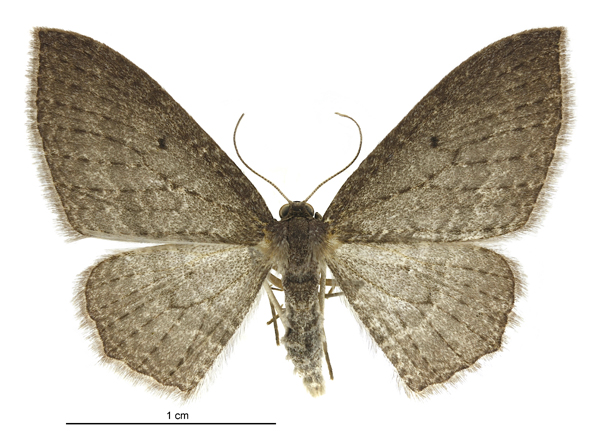
- Female
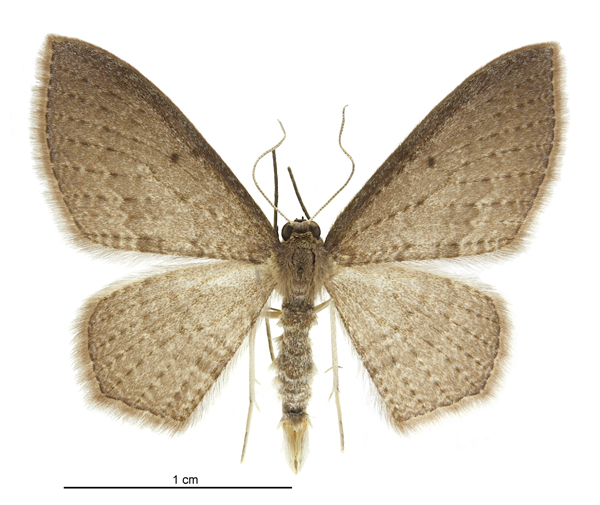
- Male

Scientific classification
- Kingdom: Animalia
- Phylum: Arthropoda
- Class: Insecta
- Order: Lepidoptera
- Family: Geometridae
- Genus: Poecilasthena
- Species: P. subpurpureata

Binomial name
- Poecilasthena subpurpureata (Walker, 1863)

Synonyms
- Asthena subpurpureata Walker, 1863; Acidalia tuhuata Felder & Rogenhofer, 1875; Astheniodes polycymaria Hampson, 1903

= Poecilasthena subpurpureata =

Species of moth

Poecilasthena subpurpureata is a species of moth of the family Geometridae. It was first described by Francis Walker in 1863 and it is endemic to New Zealand. A synomic species, Astheniodes polycymaria (the two species have almost identical male genitalia), has a holotype that was recorded by George Hampson as being from India, which, as Dayong Xue and Malcolm J. Scoble point out in their paper, would be a very strange distribution pattern. Louis Beethoven Prout reasonably calls this an error in his 1926 paper.
