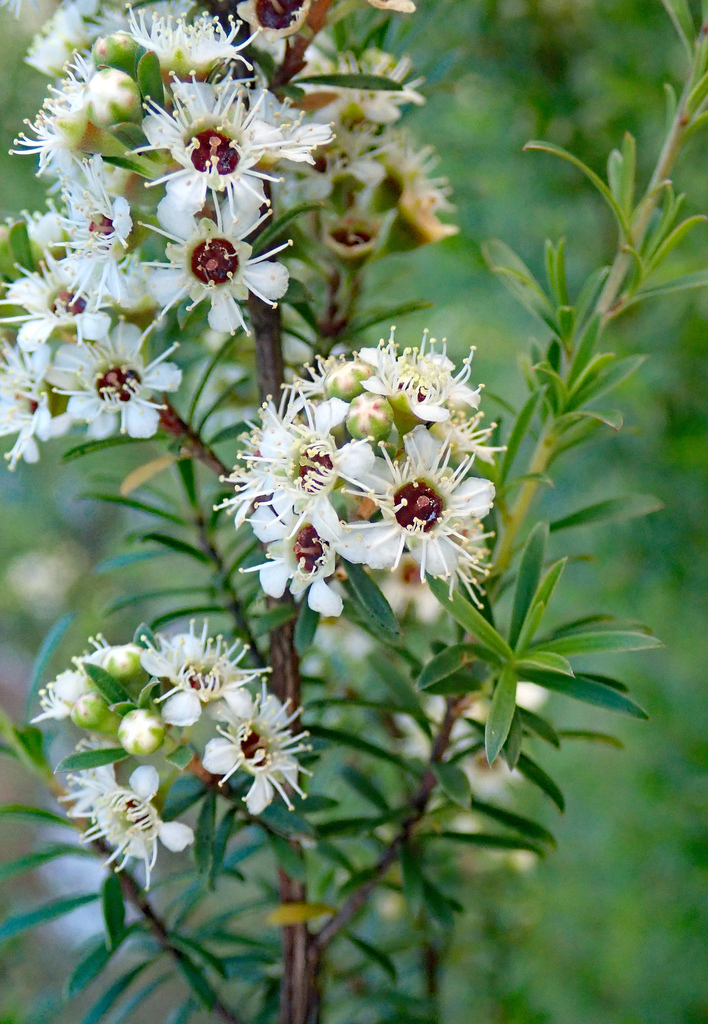
- Kunzea robusta growing on the shores of Lake Pupuke

Scientific classification
- Kingdom: Plantae
- Clade: Tracheophytes
- Clade: Angiosperms
- Clade: Eudicots
- Clade: Rosids
- Order: Myrtales
- Family: Myrtaceae
- Genus: Kunzea
- Species: K. robusta

Binomial name
- Kunzea robusta de Lange & Toelken

= Kunzea robusta =

Rawirinui

Species of tree

Kunzea robusta, commonly known as rawirinui or kānuka, is a tree in the myrtle family, Myrtaceae, and is endemic to New Zealand. It has rough, stringy, or corky bark, lance-shaped leaves that are darker on the upper surface, flowers in compact groups of up to 30, each with five or six white petals, and about 35 stamens of varying lengths.

== Description ==
Kunzea robusta is a spreading shrub or tree, typically growing to a height of 20–30 m (70–100 ft) with rough, stringy, or tessellated bark, which peels upward in long strips. The leaves are dark green above, paler below, lance-shaped, varying in size from 3.2 to 28 mm (0.1 to 1 in) long, from 0.7 to 2.5 mm (0.03 to 0.1 in) wide, and sessile or with a short petiole. The flowers are white and arranged in compact groups of up to thirty, each flower on a pedicel 1–5 mm (0.04–0.2 in) long. The floral cup is conical to top-shaped or cup-shaped, with five papery sepals about 0.5–1 mm (0.02–0.04 in) long and wide. There are five or six egg-shaped to almost round petals 1.5–4 mm (0.06–0.2 in) long and wide. Between 15 and 60 stamens, some slightly longer than the petals and others much shorter are arranged in two indistinct rows around the floral cup. Flowering occurs between April and June and is followed by fruit, which is a hairy, conical to more or less top-shaped capsule 2.2–4.6 mm (0.09–0.2 in) long and 3.2–5.3 mm (0.1–0.2 in) wide. The capsule usually opens to release its seed when mature.

== Taxonomy and naming ==
Kunzea robusta was first formally described in 2014 by New Zealand botanist Peter James de Lange from a specimen he collected near Papatea Bay. The description was published in PhytoKeys. The specific epithet (robusta) is a Latin word meaning "hard and strong like oak", referring to the stature of mature trees of this species. The taxonomic revision of the Kunzea ericoides complex by de Lange identified Kunzea robusta as a new species, but a more recent analysis of the Kunzea complex observed little genetic variation and morphological distinction between the species, questioning the evidence for 10 endemic Kunzea species and suggesting further revision.

Kānuka more often refers to Kunzea ericoides; it is a doublet of mānuka from Proto-Polynesian *nukanuka or *nuka which originally refers to Decaspermum fructicosum due to its similar small white flowers.

== Distribution and habitat ==
Rawirinui is widespread and common on both the North and South Islands of New Zealand, and has often been confused with K. ericoides. It is mostly found in coastal and low-lying areas and nearby hilly country, especially around forest margins, and does not usually grow in upper montane locations.

== Notes ==
1. Although "kānuka" is considered an alternative to rawirinui, it is much more commonly used to refer to Kunzea ericoides, as described above.
