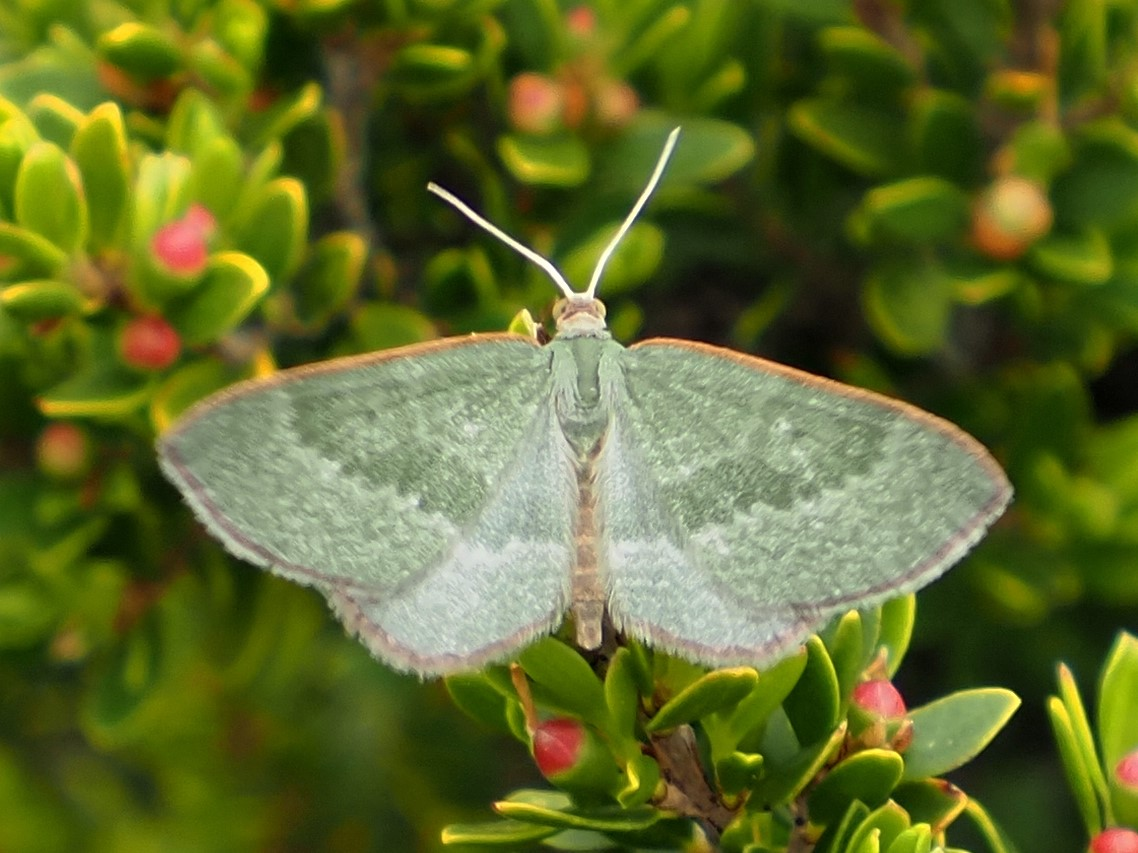

Scientific classification
- Kingdom: Animalia
- Phylum: Arthropoda
- Class: Insecta
- Order: Lepidoptera
- Family: Geometridae
- Genus: Poecilasthena
- Species: P. euphylla

Binomial name
- Poecilasthena euphylla (Meyrick, 1891)

Synonyms
- Asthena euphylla Meyrick, 1891

= Poecilasthena euphylla =

Species of moth

Poecilasthena euphylla is a species of moth in the family Geometridae first described by Edward Meyrick in 1891. It is found in Australia, including Tasmania.
