= Chalyboclydon flexilinea =

Scientific classification
- Domain: Eukaryota
- Kingdom: Animalia
- Phylum: Arthropoda
- Class: Insecta
- Order: Lepidoptera
- Family: Geometridae
- Genus: Chalyboclydon
- Species: C. flexilinea

Binomial name
- Chalyboclydon flexilinea Warren, 1898

Species of moth

'Chalyboclydon' flexilinea is a moth in the family Geometridae first described by William Warren in 1898. It is found in Myanmar and the Indian state of Sikkim.

== Taxonomy ==
The generic placement of Chalyboclydon flexilinea is unclear. It is not congeneric with the type species of Chalyboclydon. However, it has not been placed in another genus yet.
