= Minoa euthecta =

Scientific classification
- Domain: Eukaryota
- Kingdom: Animalia
- Phylum: Arthropoda
- Class: Insecta
- Order: Lepidoptera
- Family: Geometridae
- Genus: Minoa
- Species: M. euthecta

Binomial name
- Minoa euthecta (Turner, 1904)

Synonyms
- Asthena euthecta Turner, 1904; Poecilasthena euthecta

Species of moth

Minoa euthecta is a moth in the family Geometridae. It is found in Australia.
