= List of Lepidoptera of Fiji =

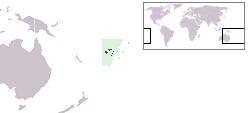
Location of Fiji

The Lepidoptera of Fiji consist of both butterflies and moths.

According to a recent estimate, about 1,000 Lepidoptera species are present on Fiji.

== Butterflies ==
=== Hesperiidae ===
- Badamia atrox subflava Waterhouse, 1920
- Badamia exclamationis (Fabricius, 1775)
- Hasora chromus
  - Hasora chromus bilunata (Butler, 1883)
  - Hasora chromus khoda (Mabille, 1876)
- Oriens augustula (Herrich-Schaeffer, 1869)

=== Lycaenidae ===
- Callophrys rubi (Linnaeus, 1758)
- Catochrysops taitensis taitensis (Boisduval, 1832)
- Catopyrops ancyra (Felder, 1860)
- Cupidohylax dampierensis (Rothschild, 1915)
- Cupidohylax patala (Kollar, 1844)
- Deudorix epijarbas diovella Waterhouse, 1920
- Euchrysops cnejus samoa (Herrich-Schaeffer, 1869)
- Famegana alsulus
  - Famegana alsulus alsulus (Herrich-Schaeffer, 1869)
  - Famegana alsulus lulu (Mathew, 1889)
- Jamides candrena (Herrich-Schaeffer, 1869)
- Jamides pulcherrima Butler, 1884
- Lampides boeticus (Linnaeus, 1767)
- Nacaduba beroe Felder & Felder, 1865
- Nacaduba biocellata armillata (Butler, 1875)
- Nacaduba dyopa (Herrich-Schaeffer, 1869)
- Nacaduba gemmata Druce, 1887
- Nacaduba samoensis Druce, 1892
- Strymon bazochii gundlachianus Bates, 1935
- Zizina communis Herrich-Schaeffer, 1869
- Zizina hylax (Fabricius, 1775)
- Zizina labradus
  - Zizina labradus labradus (Godart, 1824)
  - Zizina labradus mangoensis (Butler, 1884)

=== Nymphalidae ===
- Acraea andromacha polynesiaca Rebel, 1911
- Anosia menippe Hübner, 1816
- Danaus archippus (Fabricius, 1793)
- Danaus plexippus (Linnaeus, 1758)
- Doleschallia bisaltide vomana Fruhstorfer, 1902
- Euploea boisduvali boisduvali Lucas, 1853
- Euploea helcita escholtzii Felder & Felder, 1865: 345
- Euploea intermedia (Moore, 1883)
- Euploea jessica Butler, 1869
- Euploea leucostictos macleayii Felder & Felder, 1865
- Euploea lewinii eschscholtzii Felder & Felder, 1865
- Euploea proserpina Butler, 1866
- Euploea tulliolus forsteri Felder & Felder, 1865
- Hypolimnas antilope lutescens (Butler, 1874)
- Hypolimnas bolina pallescens Butler, 1874
- Hypolimnas eriphile (Cramer, 1782)
- Hypolimnas inopinata Waterhouse, 1920
- Hypolimnas octocula octocula Butler, 1869
- Hypolimnas tracta (Swinhoe, 1916)
- Junonia villida villida (Fabricius, 1787)
- Melanitis leda
  - Melanitis leda levuna Fruhstorfer, 1908
  - Melanitis leda solandra (Fabricius, 1775)
- Polyura caphontis
  - Polyura caphontis caphontis (Hewitson, 1863)
  - Polyura caphontis excellens Turlin, 2001
  - Polyura caphontis nambavatua Smiles, 1982
- Taenaris phorcas Westwood, 1858
- Tirumala claribella (Butler, 1882)
- Tirumala hamata
  - Tirumala hamata mellitula (Herrich-Schaeffer, 1869)
  - Tirumala hamata neptunica (Felder & Felder, 1865)
- Tirumala moderata (Butler, 1875)
- Tirumala protoneptunia (Poulton, 1924)
- Vagrans egista vitiensis (Waterhouse, 1920)
- Vanessa itea (Fabricius, 1775)
- Xois fulvida Butler, 1883
- Xois sesara Hewitson, 1865
- Ypthima vitiensis (Fruhstorfer in Seitz, 1911)

=== Papilionidae ===
- Papilio godeffroyi Semper, 1866
- Papilio schmeltzi Herrich-Schaeffer, 1869

=== Pieridae ===
- Anaphaeis clarissa Butler, 1883
- Anaphaeis vitiensis Fruhstorfer, 1902
- Appias albina (Boisduval, 1836)
- Appias athama (Lucas, 1852)
- Belenois java micronesia (Fruhstorfer, 1902)
- Catopsilia pomona (Fabricius, 1775)
- Catopsilia pyranthe lactea Butler, 1870
- Catopsilia scylla gorgophone (Boisduval, 1836)
- Cepora nabis (Lucas, 1852)
- Cepora perimale perithea (Felder & Felder, 1865)
- Delias blanca nausicae Fruhstorfer, 1899
- Eurema briggata australis (Wallace, 1867)
- Eurema hecabe
  - Eurema hecabe aprica (Butler, 1883)
  - Eurema hecabe hecabe (Linnaeus, 1758)
  - Eurema hecabe sulphurata (Butler, 1875)
- Pieris peristhene
  - Pieris peristhene rapae (Linnaeus, 1758)
  - Pieris peristhene vitiensis Fruhstorfer, 1902

== Moths ==
=== Aganaidae ===
- Asota woodfordi (Druce, 1888)

=== Agathiphagidae ===
- Agathiphaga vitiensis Dumbleton, 1952

=== Agonoxenidae ===
- Agonoxena argaula Meyrick, 1921
- Agonoxena sp. [Dugdale, 1978]

=== Alucitidae ===
- Alucita pygmaea Meyrick, 1890

=== Arctiidae ===
- Amerila astrea (Drury, 1773)
- Argina astraea (Drury, 1773)
- Argina cribraria (Clerck, 1764)
- Euchromia creusa (Linnaeus, 1758)
- Euchromia vitiensis Hampson, 1903
- Hypsa lacticinia (Cramer, 1779)
- Macaduma corvina Felder & Rogenhofer, 1875
- Macaduma montana Robinson, 1975
- Macaduma striata Robinson, 1975
- Nyctemera baulus
  - Nyctemera baulus baulus (Boisduval, 1832)
  - Nyctemera baulus fasciata Walker, 1856
- Oeonistis delia (Fabricius, 1787)
- Utetheisa clarae Robinson, 1971
- Utetheisa lotrix (Cramer, 1777)
- Utetheisa pulchelloides
  - Utetheisa pulchelloides pulchelloides Hampson, 1907
  - Utetheisa pulchelloides marsallorum Rothschild, 1910

=== Autostichidae ===
- Autosticha demias Meyrick, 1886
- Autosticha dianeura Meyrick, 1939
- Autosticha solita Meyrick, 1923

=== Batrachedridae ===
- Batrachedra atriloqua Meyrick, 1931

=== Blastobasidae ===
- Blastobasis sp. [Dugdale, 1978]
- Blastobasis lososi Adamski & Brown, 2002

=== Carposinidae ===
- Meridarchis sp. [Dugdale, 1978]
- Species of an undetermined genus [Dugdale, 1978]

=== Choreutidae ===
- Anthophila chalcotoxa Meyrick, 1886
- Brenthia melodica Meyrick, 1922

=== Coleophoridae ===
- Coleophora immortalis Meyrick, 1922

=== Copromorphidae ===
- Copromorpha gypsota Meyrick, 1886
- Copromorpha pyrrhoscia Meyrick, 1935

=== Cosmopterygidae ===
- Anatrachyntis megacentra (Meyrick, 1923)
- Ascalenia armigera Meyrick, 1923
- Ascalenia thoracista Meyrick, 1932
- Asymphorodes flexa (Meyrick, 1921)
- Cosmopterix chrysocrates Meyrick, 1919
- Cosmopterix dulcivora Meyrick, 1919
- Cosmopterix epizona Meyrick, 1897
- Cosmopterix gloriosa Meyrick, 1922
- Glaphyristis politicopa Meyrick, 1934
- Idiostyla catharopis Meyrick, 1922
- Idiostyla oculata Meyrick, 1921
- Labdia allotriopa Meyrick, 1923
- Labdia calida Meyrick, 1921
- Labdia clytemnestra Meyrick, 1923
- Labdia hastifera Meyrick, 1920
- Labdia intuens Meyrick, 1923
- Labdia microdictyas Meyrick, 1923
- Labdia orthritis Meyrick, 1930
- Labdia petroxesta Meyrick, 1921
- Labdia rationalis Meyrick, 1921
- Labdia saponacea Meyrick, 1922
- Labdia scenodoxa Meyrick, 1923
- Labdia spirocosma Meyrick, 1921
- Limnaecia anthophaga Meyrick, 1928
- Limnaecia capsigera Meyrick, 1921
- Limnaecia cirrhochrosta Meyrick, 1933
- Limnaecia fuscipalpis Meyrick, 1921
- Limnaecia inconcinna Meyrick, 1923
- Limnaecia phaeopleura Meyrick, 1924
- Persicoptila anthomima Meyrick, 1921
- Persicoptila aquilifera Meyrick, 1932
- Persicoptila phoenoxantha Meyrick, 1923
- Proterocosma epizona Meyrick, 1886
- Proterocosma triplanetis Meyrick, 1886
- Pyroderces euryspora Meyrick, 1922
- Pyroderces paroditis Meyrick, 1928
- Pyroderces terminella (Walker, 1864)
- Stagmatophora cyma Bradley, 1953
- Stagmatophora erebinthia Meyrick, 1921
- Stagmatophora flexa Meyrick, 1921
- Trissodoris honorariella (Walsingham, 1907)
- Ulochora streptosema Meyrick, 1920

=== Cossidae ===
- Acritocera negligens Butler, 1886

=== Crambidae ===
- Aeolopetra palaeanthes Meyrick, 1934
- Aethaloessa floridalis (Zeller, 1852)
- Agrioglypta enneactis Meyrick, 1932
- Alloperissa creagraula Meyrick, 1934
- Ambia parachrysis Meyrick, 1935
- Aglaops homaloxantha (Meyrick, 1933)
- Aphrophantis velifera Meyrick, 1933
- Argyria polyniphas Meyrick, 1932
- Atomoclostis deltosema Meyrick, 1934
- Aulacodes nephelanthopa Meyrick, 1934
- Autarotis euryala Meyrick, 1886
- Authaeretis eridora Meyrick, 1886
- Autocharis senatoria (Meyrick, 1932)
- Auxolophotis cosmophilopis (Meyrick, 1934)
- Auxolophotis ioxanthias Meyrick, 1933
- Angustalius hapaliscus (Zeller, 1852)
- Angustalius malacellus (Duponchel, 1836)
- Botyodes asialis Guenée, 1854
- Bradina chalcophaea Meyrick, 1932
- Bradina cirrhophanes Meyrick, 1932
- Bradina carterotoxa Meyrick, 1932
- Bradina erilitalis (Felder & Rogenhofer, 1875)
- Bradina haplomorpha Meyrick, 1932
- Bradina leptographa Meyrick, 1932
- Bradina leucura Hampson, 1897
- Bradina metaleucalis Walker, 1866
- Bradina miantodes Meyrick, 1932
- Bradina parallela (Meyrick, 1886)
- Bradina porphyroclista Meyrick, 1934
- Bradina punctilinealis Hampson, 1907
- Bradina semnopa Meyrick, 1886
- Bradina stigmophanes Meyrick, 1932
- Bradina trispila (Meyrick, 1886)
- Calamotropha dielota (Meyrick, 1886)
- Cnaphalocrocis exigua (Butler, 1879)
- Cnaphalocrocis perinephes (Meyrick, 1886)
- Cnaphalocrocis ruralis (Walker, 1859)
- Cnaphalocrocis suspicalis (Walker, 1859)
- Cnaphalocrocis trapezalis (Guenée, 1854)
- Cnaphalocrocis trebiusalis (Walker, 1859)
- Compsophila iocosma Meyrick, 1886
- Conogethes punctiferalis (Guenée, 1854)
- Crocidolomia pavonana (Fabricius, 1794)
- Cryptographis cucurbitalis (Guenée, 1862)
- Cryptographis glauculalis (Guenée, 1854)
- Cryptographis indica (Saunders, 1851)
- Culladia cuneiferellus (Walker, 1863)
- Culladia paralyticus (Meyrick, 1932)
- Diasemia endoschista Meyrick, 1932
- Diasemiopsis ramburialis (Duponchel, 1834)
- Dichocrosis fluminalis Butler, 1883
- Diplopseustis perieresalis (Walker, 1859)
- Diptychophora sp. [Dugdale, 1978]
- Dracaenura agramma Meyrick, 1882
- Dracaenura asthenota Meyrick, 1886)
- Dracaenura myota Meyrick, 1886)
- Dracaenura pelochra Meyrick, 1886)
- Dracaenura stenosoma (Felder & Rogenhofer, 1875)
- Eoophyla albipuncta Clayton, 2017
- Eoophyla crisota (Meyrick,
- Eoophyla lutea Clayton, 2017
- Eoophyla hexalitha (Meyrick, 1886)
- Eoophyla montanalis Clayton, 2017
- Eoophyla nephelanthopa (Meyrick, 1934)
- Eoophyla vitiensis Clayton, 2017
- Eumaragma orthiopis Meyrick, 1933
- Eurytorna heterodoxa Meyrick, 1886
- Glaucocharis bathrogramma (Meyrick, 1933)
- Glaucocharis clandestina Gaskin, 1985
- Glaucocharis fehrei Gaskin, 1985
- Glaucocharis fijiensis Gaskin, 1985
- Glaucocharis penetrata (Meyrick, 1933)
- Glaucocharis praemialis (Meyrick, 1931)
- Glaucocharis robinsoni Gaskin, 1985
- Glaucocharis sericophthalma Meyrick, 1933
- Glaucocharis simmondsi Gaskin, 1975
- Glaucocharis tyriochrysa (Meyrick, 1933)
- Glyphodes caesalis Walker, 1859
- Glyphodes cymocraspeda (Meyrick, 1932)
- Glyphodes diplocyma Hampson, 1912
- Glyphodes multilinealis Kenrick, 1907
- Glyphodes stolalis Guenée, 1854
- Haritalodes adjunctalis Leraut, 2005
- Hellula undalis (Fabricius, 1781)
- Heortia vitessoides (Moore, 1885)
- Herpetogramma licarsisalis (Walker, 1859)
- Herpetogramma phaeopteralis (Guenée, 1854)
- Herpetogramma rudis (Warren, 1892)
- Hoploscopa anamesaTams, 1935
- Hoploscopa astrapias Meyrick, 1886
- Hyalobathra xanthocrossa Meyrick, 1932
- Hydriris ornatalis (Duponchel, 1832)
- Hymenoptychis sordida Zeller, 1852
- Lamprosema allocosma (Meyrick, 1886)
- Lamprosema foedalis (Guenée, 1854)
- Lamprosema leucostrepta (Meyrick, 1886)
- Lamprosema opsocausta (Meyrick, 1935)
- Lipararchis hyacinthopa Meyrick, 1934
- Lygropispha eoxantha Meyrick, 1933
- Macaretaera hesperis Meyrick, 1886
- Maruca vitrata (Fabricius, 1787)
- Meroctena tullalis Walker, 1859
- Meroctena sirioxantha (Meyrick, 1886)
- Nacoleia octasema (Meyrick, 1886)
- Nymphicula australis (Felder & Rogenhofer, 1874)
- Nymphicula cyanolitha (Meyrick, 1886)
- Oligostigma barbararcha Meyrick, 1932
- Oligostigma chrysota (Meyrick, 1886)
- Oligostigma polydectale (Walker, 1859)
- Omiodes diemenalis (Guenée, 1854)
- Omiodes indicata (Fabricius, 1775)
- Omphisa illisalis Walker, 1859
- Pagyda tremula Meyrick, 1932
- Palpita spilogramma (Meyrick, 1934
- Palpita spinosa Clayton, 2008
- Palpita vitiensis Clayton, 2008
- Paracentristis incommoda Meyrick, 1934
- Parapoynx unilinealis (Snellen van Vollenhoven, 1876)
- Parapoynx villidalis (Walker, 1859)
- Parotis marginata (Hampson, 1893)
- Parotis niphopepla (Meyrick, 1933)
- Parotis sp. [Dugdale, 1978]
- Parotis suralis (Lederer, 1863)
- Piletocera albescens Rebel, 1915
- Piletocera argopis (Meyrick, 1886)
- Piletocera cyclospila (Meyrick, 1886)
- Piletocera dactyloptila (Meyrick, 1886)
- Piletocera enneaspila Meyrick, 1933
- Piletocera erebina Butler, 1886
- Piletocera melanauges (Meyrick, 1886)
- Piletocera microcentra (Meyrick, 1886)
- Piletocera nasonia Meyrick, 1933
- Piletocera nigrescens (Butler, 1886)
- Piletocera ocelligera Meyrick, 1932)
- Piletocera ochrosema (Meyrick, 1886)
- Piletocera pseudadelpha (Meyrick, 1887)
- Piletocera rhopalophora Meyrick, 1934
- Piletocera signiferalis (Wallengren, 1860)
- Piletocera ulophanes Meyrick, 1886
- Piletocera xanthosoma (Meyrick, 1886)
- Pilocrocis eriomorpha Meyrick, 1933
- Pilocrocis stephanorma Meyrick, 1935
- Prodelophanes eucharis Meyrick, 1937
- Prophantis octoguttalis (Felder & Rogenhofer, 1875)
- Prototyla alopecopa Meyrick, 1933
- Prototyla haemoxantha Meyrick, 1935
- Psara acrospila (Meyrick, 1886)
- Psara stultalis (Walker, 1859)
- Ptiladarcha consularis Meyrick, 1933
- Pycnarmon cribrata (Fabricius, 1794)
- Rehimena infundibulalis (Snellen van Vollenhoven, 1882)
- Rehimena phrynealis (Walker, 1859)
- Sameodes cancellalis (Zeller, 1852)
- Scirpophaga imparellus (Meyrick, 1879)
- Scirpophaga nivella (Fabricius, 1794)
- Scoparia orthioplecta Meyrick, 1937
- Spoladea recurvalis (Fabricius, 1775)
- Stemorrhages oceanitis Meyrick, 1886
- Sufetula sp. [Dugdale, 1978]
- Syllepte cohaesalis (Walker, 186)
- Syllepte derogata (Fabricius, 1775)
- Syllepte sabinusalis (Walker, 1859)
- Tatobotys biannulalis (Walker, 1866)
- Terastia meticulosalis Guenée, 1854
- Trigamozeucta radiciformis Meyrick, 1937

=== Epermeniidae ===
- Epermenia symmorias Meyrick, 1923

=== Epiplemidae ===
- Epiplema conchiferata Moore, 1887
- Epiplema cretosa Swinhoe, 1902
- Epiplema lomalangi Robinson, 1975
- Epiplema simmondsi Robinson, 1975
- Europlema semibrunnea (Pagenstecher, 1888)
- Gathynia albibasis Warren, 1896
- Phazaca cythera (Swinhoe, 1902)
- Phazaca nakula Clayton, 2002
- Phazaca yasawa (Robinson, 1975)

=== Erebidae ===
- Achaea janata (Linnaeus, 1758)
- Achaea robinsoni Holloway in Barlow, 1982
- Achaea serva (Fabricius, 1775)
- Aedia leucomelas (Linnaeus, 1758)
- Aedia sericea (Butler, 1882)
- Anomis esocampta Hampson, 1926
- Anomis figlina Butler, 1889
- Anomis sabulifera Guenée, 1852
- Anomis samoana (Butler, 1886)
- Anticarsia irrorata (Fabricius, 1781)
- Araeopteron griseata Hampson, 1907
- Attonda adspersa (Felder & Rogenhofer, 1874)
- Avatha discolor (Fabricius, 1794)
- Bastilla vitiensis (Butler, 1886)
- Catada charalis Swinhoe, 1900
- Catadoides fijiensis Robinson, 1975
- Catadoides vunindawa Robinson, 1975
- Chalciope alcyona (Druce, 1888)
- Chrysopera combinans (Walker, 1858)
- Cosmophila flava (Fabricius, 1775)
- Dichromia quinqualis Walker, 1859
- Dichromia trigonalis Guenée, 1854
- Diomea fenella Robinson, 1969
- Dysgonia anetica (Felder & Rogenhofer, 1875)
- Dysgonia duplicata (Robinson, 1975)
- Dysgonia hicanora (Turner, 1903)
- Dysgonia illibata (Fabricius, 1775)
- Dysgonia joviana (Stoll in Cramer, 1782)
- Dysgonia koroensis (Robinson, 1969)
- Dysgonia myops (Guenée, 1852)
- Dysgonia prisca (Walker, 1858)
- Dysgonia propyrrha (Walker, 1858)
- Echanella hirsutipennis Robinson, 1975
- Entomogramma torsa Guenée, 1852
- Ercheia kebea Bethune-Baker, 1906
- Ericeia congregata (Walker, 1858)
- Ericeia inangulata levuensis Prout, 1929
- Ericeia leichardtii (Koch, 1865)
- Erygia precedens (Walker, 1857)
- Eublemma anachoresis (Wallengren, 1863)
- Eublemma baccalix (Swinhoe, 1886)
- Eublemma cochylioides (Guenée, 1852)
- Eublemma innocens (Butler, 1886)
- Eublemma pudica (Snellen van Vollenhoven, 1880)
- Eublemma ragusana (Freyer, 1844)
- Eublemma rivula (Moore, 1882)
- Eublemmoides crassiuscula (Walker, 1864)
- Gonitis editrix (Guenée, 1852)
- Gonitis involuta vitiensis (Butler, 1886)
- Grammodes geometrica (Fabricius, 1775)
- Grammodes oculicola Walker, 1858
- Harita nodyna (Bethune-Baker, 1908)
- Helicoverpa armigera (Hübner, 1809)
- Helicoverpa assulta (Guenée, 1852: 178 [Heliothis]
- Helicoverpa zea (Boddie, 1850)
- Hypena commixtura (Swinhoe, 1918)
- Hypena conscitalis Walker, 1865
- Hypena cryptica Robinson, 1975
- Hypena duplicalis (Walker, 1859
- Hypena fijiensis Robinson, 1975
- Hypena gonospilalis Walker, 1865
- Hypena iconicalis Walker, 1859
- Hypena laceratalis Walker, 1859
- Hypena masurialis Guenée, 1854
- Hypena robustalis Snellen van Vollenhoven, 1880
- Hypenagonia anna Robinson, 1975
- Hypenagonia barbara Robinson, 1975
- Hypenagonia catherina Robinson, 1975
- Hypenagonia diana Robinson, 1975
- Hypenagonia emma Robinson, 1975
- Hyperlopha cristifera (Walker, 1865)
- Hypocala deflorata (Fabricius, 1794)
- Hypocala rosrata (Fabricius, 1794)
- Hypospila similis similis Tams, 1935
- Hypospila similis fijiensis Robinson, 1975
- Lacera contrasta Holloway, 1979
- Lacera noctilio (Fabricius, 1794)
- Luceria oculalis (Moore, 1877)
- Maliattha melanesiensis Robinson, 1975
- Maliattha ritsemae (Snellen van Vollenhoven, 1880)
- Mecistoptera sp. near albisigna Hampson [teste Robinson 1975]
- Mecodina variata Robinson, 1969
- Mocis frugalis (Fabricius, 1775)
- Mocis trifasciata (Stephens, 1829)
- Mocis undata (Fabricius, 1775)
- Nagia robinsoni Holloway, 1982
- Neogabara plagiola Wileman & West, 1929
- Ophiusa coronata (Fabricius, 1775)
- Ophiusa disjungens tongaensis (Hampson, 1913)
- Ophiusa fijiensis (Robinson, 1969)
- Oruza cariosa (Lucas, 1894)
- Oxyodes scrobiculata
  - Oxyodes scrobiculata samoana Tams, 1935
  - Oxyodes scrobiculata scrobiculata (Fabricius, 1775)
  - Oxyodes scrobiculata tanymekes Tams, 1935
- Pantara ophiusalis lunifera (Druce, 1888)
- Pantydia metaspila (Walker, 1857)
- Papuacola costalis (Moore, 1883)
- Parallelia arctotaenia (Guenée, 1852)
- Parilyrgis concolor Bethune-Baker, 1908
- Polydesma boarmoides Guenée, 1852
- Ptochosiphla oedipus Meyrick, 1933
- Remigia vitiensis (Hampson, 1913)
- Rhesala irregularis circuluncus Holloway, 1979
- Rhesalides asphalta (Swinhoe, 1901)
- Rivula dipterygosoma Tams, 1935
- Rivula maxwelli Robinson, 1975
- Rivula polynesiana Hampson, 1926
- Rusicada fulvida Guenée, 1852
- Rusicada nigritarsis
  - Rusicada nigritarsis nigritarsis (Walker, 1857)
  - Rusicada nigritarsis xanthochroa (Butler, 1886)
- Rusicada revocans (Walker, 1858)
- Rusicada vulpina (Butler, 1886)
- Schrankia furoroa Robinson, 1975
- Schrankia vitiensis Robinson, 1975
- Serrodes campana callipepla Prout, 1929
- Serrodes mediopallens Prout, 1924
- Speiredonia mutabilis (Fabricius, 1794)
- Speiredonia simplex obalauae Bethune-Baker, 1915
- Speiredonia strigiformis (Robinson, 1975)
- Thyas coronata (Fabricius, 1775)
- Thyas honesta Hübner, 1824
- Thyas miniacea (Felder & Rogenhofer, 1874)
- Thyas regia Lucas, 1894
- Trigonodes cephise (Cramer, 1779)
- Trigonodes hyppasia (Cramer, 1779)

==== Herminiinae ====
- Bocana manifestalis Walker, 1858
- Hydrillodes lentalis Guenée, 1854
- Hydrillodes surata Meyrick, 1910
- Lophocoleus acuta Robinson, 1975
- Lophocoleus albipuncta Robinson, 1975
- Lophocoleus iridescens Robinson, 1975
- Lophocoleus mirabilis Butler, 1886
- Lophocoleus rubrescens Robinson, 1975
- Lophocoleus suffusa Robinson, 1975
- Lophoptera hemithyris (Hampson, 1905)
- Palaeocoleus sypnoides (Butler, 1886)
- Progonia micrastis (Meyrick, 1902)
- Raganagra vatalis (Walker, 1859)
- Simplicia caeneusalis (Walker, 1859)
- Tholocoleus astrifer (Butler, 1886)

=== Euteliidae ===
- Anigraea ochrobasis Hampson, 1912
- Anigraea pectinata Robinson, 1975
- Paectes fijiensis Robinson, 1975
- Pataeta carbo (Guenée, 1852)
- Penicillaria dinawa Bethune-Baker, 1906
- Penicillaria jocosatrix Guenée, 1852
- Penicillaria magnifica (Robinson, 1975)
- Penicillaria meeki Bethune-Baker, 1906
- Penicillaria nugatrix Guenée in Boisduval & Guenée, 1852
- Targalla barbara (Robinson, 1975)
- Targalla delatrix (Guenée, 1852)
- Targalla palliatrix (Guenée, 1852)

==== Stictopterinae ====
- Gyrtona acutipennis (Robinson, 1975)
- Gyrtona hopkinsi Tams, 1935
- Gyrtona purpurea Robinson, 1975
- Gyrtona rotundipennis (Robinson, 1975)
- Stictoptera cucullioides Guenée, 1852
- Stictoptera describens (Walker, 1857)
- Stictoptera obalaui Bethune-Baker, 1916
- Stictoptera stygia Hampson, 1912
- Stictoptera vitiensis Hampson, 1912

=== Gelechiidae ===
- Anarsia sp. near sagittaria Meyrick [Dugdale, 1978]
- Atasthalistis hieropla Meyrick, 1919
- Dichomeris hieropla (Meyrick, 1919)
- Dichomeris siderosema Turner, 1919
- Hypatima brachyrrhiza (Meyrick, 1921)
- Hypatima mycetinopa (Meyrick, 1934)
- Hypatima tephroplintha (Meyrick, 1923)
- Idiophantis chiridota Meyrick, 1914
- Mesophleps epiochra (Meyrick, 1886)
- Myconita lipara Bradley, 1953
- Pectinophora gossypiella Saunders, 1843
- Phthorimaea operculella (Zeller, 1873)
- Scrobipalpa heliopa (Lower, 1900)
- Sitotroga cerealella (Olivier, 1789)
- Sitotroga horogramma (Meyrick, 1921)
- Thiotricha sp. near strophiacma Meyrick [Dugdale, 1978]

=== Geometridae ===
- Agathia pisina Butler, 1887
- Anisodes lautokensis Prout, 1929
- Aplochlora vivilaca (Walker, 1861)
- Bosara linda (Robinson, 1975)
- Brabira apatopleura Prout, 1934
- Bulonga phillipsi Prout, 1930
- Casbia aedoea Robinson, 1975
- Casbia alphitoniae Prout, 1929
- Casuariclystis latifascia (Walker, 1866)
- Catoria camelaria carbonata Warren, 1896
- Catoria hemiprosopa (Turner, 1904)
- Chloroclystis bosora (Druce, 1888)
- Chloroclystis encteta Prout, 1934
- Chloroclystis hypotmeta Prout, 1934
- Chloroclystis katherina Robinson, 1975
- Chloroclystis mariae Robinson, 1975
- Chloroclystis pyrsodonta Turner, 1922
- Chloroclystis rubicunda Prout, 1934
- Cleora diversa Robinson, 1971
- Cleora fowlesi Robinson, 1971
- Cleora injectaria
  - Cleora injectaria injectaria (Walker, 1860)
  - Cleora injectaria anidryta Prout, 1928
- Cleora lanaris (Butler, 1886)
- Cleora munditibia
  - Cleora munditibia munditibia Prout, 1929
  - Cleora munditibia lauensis Robinson, 1975
- Cleora nausori (Bethune-Baker, 1905)
- Cleora ochricollis (Prout, 1934)
- Cleora perstricta Prout, 1934
- Cleora samoana
  - Cleora samoana fijiensis Robinson, 1975
  - Cleora samoana noatau Robinson, 1975
- Cleora vitensis (Bethune-Baker, 1905)
- Clepsimelia phryganeoides Warren, 1897
- Collix lasiospila (Meyrick, 1886)
- Collix olivia Robinson, 1975
- Collix patricia Robinson, 1975
- Comibaena cheramota (Meyrick, 1886)
- Comostola pyrrhogona augustata (Prout, 1917)
- Comostola rhodoselas (Prout, 1928)
- Cypra delicatula Boisduval, 1832
- Eoasthena catharia Prout, 1934
- Eoasthena extranea Prout, 1934
- Eoasthena gnophobathra Prout, 1934
- Eoasthena quilla Robinson, 1975
- Eoasthena rowena Robinson, 1975
- Eoasthena stygna Prout, 1934
- Eois sp. near pyrauges Prout [teste Robinson 1975]
- Episteira nigrilinearia enochra (Prout, 1934)
- Eucrostes disparata (Walker, 1861)
- Eucyclodes pieroides (Walker, 1861)
- Eupithecia vermiculata Snellen van Vollenhoven, 1874
- Glaucoclystis sp. [teste Hollway, 1979]
- Gonodonta clelia (Cramer, 1780)
- Gymnoscelis concinna
  - Gymnoscelis concinna concinna Swinhoe, 1902
  - Gymnoscelis concinna nephelota Prout, 1958
- Gymnoscelis erymna Meyrick, 1886: 192
- Gymnoscelis imparatalis (Walker, 1865)
- Gymnoscelis sara Robinson, 1975
- Gymnoscelis tristrigosa (Butler, 1880)
- Gymnoscelis tylocera Prout, 1930
- Horisme chlorodesma (Meyrick, 1886)
- Horisme rewaensis (Bethune-Baker, 1905)
- Horisme tersata Robinson, 1975
- Hybridoneura picta (Warren, 1901)
- Idaea bathromyses (Prout, 1934)
- Idaea dicenea Prout, 1934
- Idaea rhipistis (Meyrick, 1886)
- Maxates albifulgens (Prout, 1934)
- Maxates quadrizona (Prout, 1934)
- Maxates stuhlmanni (Prout in Seitz, 1933)
- Mesotrophe harrietae (Robinson, 1975)
- Mesurodes erichlora (Meyrick, 1886)
- Micrulia tenuilinea Warren, 1896
- Mnesiloba eupitheciata (Walker, 1863)
- Nadagara irretracta levuensis Robinson, 1975
- Pasiphilodes nina (Robinson, 1975)
- Pasiphilodes subtrita (Walker, 1866)
- Pelagodes veraria (Guenée, 1857)
- Perixera ceramis Meyrick, 1886
- Perixera gloria (Robinson, 1975)
- Perixera niveopuncta (Warren, 1897)
- Perixera obliviaria (Walker, 1861)
- Perixera porphyropis Meyrick, 1888
- Perixera prionodes Meyrick, 1886: 209
- Perixera samoana (Warren, 1897)
- Petelia aesyla Prout, 1930
- Poecilasthena inhaesa Prout, 1934
- Poecilasthena leucydra Prout, 1934
- Polyclysta gonycrota Prout, 1932
- Probithia sesquilinea (Prout, 1930)
- Pseuderyrthrolophus bipunctatus idmon (Prout, 1930)
- Ruttelerona presbytica Robinson, 1975
- Sauris acanthina Prout, 1930
- Sauris dentalineata (Warren, 1905)
- Sauris elaica (Meyrick, 1886)
- Sauris hirudinata Guenée, 1858
- Sauris priva Prout, 1930
- Sauris ursula Robinson, 1975
- Sauris victoria Robinson, 1975
- Sauris wanda Robinson, 1975
- Sauris xissa Robinson, 1975
- Scardamia eucampta Prout, 1930
- Scopula epigypsa (Meyrick, 1886)
- Scopula homodoxa (Meyrick, 1886)
- Scopula julietae Robinson, 1975
- Scopula sublinearia ida Robinson, 1975
- Scotocyma miscix Prout, 1934
- Semiothisa abydata (Guenée, 1857)
- Spiralisigna acidna (Turner, 1904)
- Symmacra solidaria baptata (Warren, 1897)
- Symmimetis merceri Robinson, 1975
- Symmimetis thorectes Prout, 1934
- Thalassodes chloropsis Meyrick, 1886
- Thalassodes figurata Robinson, 1968
- Thalassodes fiona Robinson, 1975
- Thalassodes liquescens Prout, 1934
- Thalassodes opalina Butler, 1880
- Thalassodes pilaria Guenée, 1858
- Thalassodes quadraria Guenée, 1857

=== Glyphipterygidae ===
- Ernolytis chlorospora Meyrick, 1922
- Glyphipterix isoclista Meyrick, 1925

=== Gracillariidae ===
- Acrocercops caerula (Meyrick, 1912)
- Acrocercops centrometra (Meyrick, 1920)
- Acrocercops habroscia Meyrick, 1921
- Acrocercops macroclina Meyrick, 1916
- Acrocercops patellata Meyrick, 1921
- Acrocercops praesecta Meyrick, 1922
- Acrocercops sarcocrossa Meyrick, 1924
- Acrocercops sp. near albidorsella Bradley [teste Dugdale, 1978]
- Acrocercops sp. near pavonicola Vári [teste Dugdale, 1978]
- Caloptilia palaearcha (Meyrick, 1930)
- Caloptilia soyella Van Deventer, 1904
- Caloptilia xanthopharella Meyrick, 1880
- Conopomorpha oceanica Bradley, 1986
- Cyphosticha caerulea Meyrick, 1912
- Gracilaria glyphidopis Meyrick, 1934
- Gracilaria heroscelis Meyrick, 1939
- Liocrobyla paraschista Meyrick, 1916
- Parectopa phoenicaula Meyrick, 1934
- Phyllonoryctyer aglaozona (Meyrick, 1882)
- Timodora callicirrha Meyrick, 1924

=== Hepialidae ===
- Phassodes vitiensis (Rothschild, 1895)

=== Hyblaeidae ===
- Hyblaea puera (Cramer, 1777)
- Hyblaea sanguinea
  - Hyblaea sanguinea sanguinea Gaede, 1917
  - Hyblaea sanguinea vitiensis Prout, 1919

=== Immidae ===
- Imma autodoxa Meyrick, 1886
- Imma chlorospila Meyrick, 1923
- Imma harpagacma Meyrick, 1935
- Imma leucomystis Meyrick, 1923
- Imma philonoma Meyrick, 1925
- Imma pyrophthalma Meyrick, 1937
- Imma trachyptila Meyrick, 1921

=== Limacodidae ===
- Beggina albifascia Robinson, 1975
- Beggina bicornis Clayton, 2002
- Beggina dentilinea Robinson, 1975
- Beggina mediopunctata Robinson, 1975
- Beggina minima Robinson, 1975
- Beggina unicornis Robinson, 1975
- Beggina zena Robinson, 1975

=== Lymantriidae ===
- Adetoneura lentiginosa Collenette, 1933
- Calliteara fidjiensis (Mabille & Vuillot, 1890)
- Calliteara flavobrunnea (Robinson, 1969)
- Calliteara nandarivatus (Robinson, 1968)

=== Lyonetiidae ===
- Lyonetia luxurians Meyrick, 1922
- Lyonetia spinitarsis Meyrick, 1922
- Phrixosceles fibulatrix Meyrick, 1922
- Phruriastis meliphaga Meyrick, 1923
- Pontodryas loxosema Meyrick, 1920
- Vanicela sp. [Dugdale, 1978]
- Species of an undetermined genus [Dugdale, 1978]

=== Nepticulidae ===
- Stigmella sp. [teste Nieuwkerken & Berg 2003]

=== Noctuidae ===
- Aegilia vitiscribens Holloway, 1985
- Agrapha albostriata (Bremer & Grey, 1853)
- Agrotis aneituma Walker, 1865
- Agrotis ipsilon (Hüfnagel, 1766)
- Agrotis munda Walker, 1856
- Amyna abyssa (Snellen van Vollenhoven, 1880)
- Amyna natalis (Walker, 1858)
- Amyna octo (Guenée, 1852)
- Amyna punctum (Fabricius, 1794)
- Arcte coerulea (Guenée, 1852)
- Arcte modesta Van der Hoeven, 1840
- Argyrogramma signata (Fabricius, 1792)
- Arsacia rectalis (Walker, 1863)
- Athetis nonagrica (Walker, 1864)
- Athetis reclusa (Walker, 1862)
- Athetis striolata (Butler, 1886)
- Athetis thoracica (Moore, 1884)
- Callopistria argyrosemastis (Hampson, 1918)
- Callopistria exotica (Guenée, 1852)
- Callopistria maillardi (Guenée, 1862)
- Callopistria meridionalis rotumensis Robinson, 1975
- Callopistria reticulata (Pagenstecher, 1884)
- Chasmina candida (Walker, 1865)
- Chasmina tibialis (Fabricius, 1775)
- Chasmina viridis Robinson, 1975
- Chrysodeixis acuta (Walker, 1858)
- Chrysodeixis chalcites (Esper, 1789)
- Chrysodeixis eriosoma (Doubleday, 1843)
- Chrysodeixis illuminata (Robinson, 1968)
- Condica conducta (Walker, 1857)
- Condica dolorosa (Walker, 1865)
- Condica illecta (Walker, 1865)
- Dactyloplusia impulsa (Walker, 1865)
- Diarsia intermixta (Guenée, 1852)
- Dyrzela trichoptera Robinson, 1975
- Eudocima fullonia (Clerck, 1764)
- Eudocima materna (Linnaeus, 1758)
- Eudocima paulii (Robinson, 1968)
- Eudocima salaminia (Cramer, 1777)
- Graphanina disjungens (Walker, 1868)
- Leucania fiyu Hreblay & Yoshimatsu, 1998
- Leucania scotti Butler, 1886
- Lignispalta caerulea (Robinson, 1969)
- Mudaria sp. near leprosticta (Hampson) [teste Robinson, 1975]
- Mythimna aroroyensis (Calora, 1966)
- Mythimna loreyi (Duponchel, 1827)
- Mythimna separata (Walker, 1864)
- Mythimna unipuncta (Haworth, 1809)
- Mythimna venalba (Moore, 1867)
- Mythimna yu (Guenée, 1852)
- Gyrtona polionota (Hampson, 1905)
- Platysenta sp. [Robinson 1975]
- Plusiodonta dimorpha Robinson, 1975
- Sarbissa bostrychonota (Tams, 1929)
- Sasunaga oenistis (Hampson, 1908)
- Sasunaga tenebrosa (Moore, 1867)
- Sasunaga tomaniiviensis Robinson, 1975
- Savoca divitalis pacifica Holloway, 1985
- Schinia bifascia Hübner, 1818
- Spodoptera acronyctoides Guenée, 1852
- Spodoptera cinerea (Holloway, 1979)
- Spodoptera exigua (Hübner, 1808)
- Spodoptera littoralis (Boisduval, 1833)
- Spodoptera litura (Fabricius, 1775)
- Spodoptera mauritia (Boisduval, 1833)
- Spodoptera picta (Guérin-Méneville, 1838)
- Stenopterygia nausoriensis Robinson, 1975
- Tiracola plagiata (Walker, 1857)

=== Nolidae ===
- Apothripa vailima Tarns, 1935
- Austrocarea albipicta (Hampson, 1905)
- Barasa triangularis Robinson, 1975
- Blenina vatu Holloway, 1975
- Blenina lichenopa vatu Robinson, 1975
- Barasa triangularis Holloway, 1975
- Calathusa sp. near basicunea Walker
- Carea albipicta Hampson, 1905,
- Earias flavida Felder, 1861
- Earias huegeli Rogenhofer
- Earias luteolaria Hampson, 1891
- Earias perhuegeli Holloway, 1977
- Earias vittella (Fabricius, 1794)
- Etanna basalis Walker, 1862
- Etanna breviuscula (Walker, 1863)
- Etanna mackwoodi (Hampson, 1902)
- Etanna vailima (Tams, 1935)
- Etanna vittalis (Walker, 1866)
- Gabala australiata Warren, 1916
- Garella nilotica (Rogenhofer, 1882)
- Giaura nigrostrigata (Bethune-Baker, 1905)
- Giaura sokotokai Robinson, 1969
- Giaura spinosa Robinson, 1975
- Giaura tetragramma (Hampson, 1905)
- Maceda savura Robinson, 1968
- Maceda mansueta Walker, 1857
- Maurilia iconica (Walker, 1857)
- Microthripa buxtoni Tams, 1935
- Mniothripa bradleyi D. S. Fletcher, 1957
- Nanaguna albisecta Hampson, 1905
- Nanaguna breviuscula Walker, 1863
- Nanaguna vittalis (Walker, 1866)
- Nola fijiensis Robinson, 1975
- Nola insularum (Collenette, 1928)
- Nola lichenosa Robinson, 1975
- Nola samoana Robinson, 1975
- Nola savura Clayton, 2018
- Nola transversata Robinson, 1975
- Nycteola indicatana (Walker, 1863)
- Xanthodes congenita (Hampson, 1912)
- Xanthodes intersepta Guenée, 1852

=== Notodontidae ===
- Lasioceros aroa vitiensis Robinson, 1975

=== Oecophoridae ===
- Calicotis praeusta Meyrick, 1922
- Heiromantis ancylogramma Meyrick, 1933
- Heiromantis munerata Meyrick, 1924
- Heiromantis praemiata Meyrick, 1921
- Heiromantis tribolopa Meyrick, 1924
- Idiomictis aneuropa Meyrick, 1935
- Idiomictis rhizonoma Meyrick, 1935
- Peritornenta gennaea Meyrick, 1923
- Peritornenta spilanthes Meyrick, 1934
- Pseudaegeria squamicornis (Felder & Rogenhofer, 1875)
- Stoeberhinus testacea Butler, 1881

=== Plutellidae ===
- Plutella xylostella (Linnaeus, 1758)

=== Psychidae ===
- Melasina hemithalama Meyrick, 1935
- Narycia ennomopis Meyrick, 1934
- Narycia toxophragma Meyrick, 1937
- Themeliotis goniozona Meyrick, 1922

=== Pterophoridae ===
- Imbophorus aptalis (Walker, 1864)
- Macropiratis halieutica Meyrick, 1932
- Marasmarcha pumilio (Zeller, 1873)
- Pterophora candidalis (Walker, 1864)
- Pterophora endogramma (Meyrick, 1922)
- Sphenarches caffer (Zeller, 1852)

=== Pyralidae ===
- Acolastodes euryniphas Meyrick, 1934
- Acolastodes oenotripta Meyrick, 1934
- Anydraula drusiusalis Walker, 1859
- Aphomia isodesma (Meyrick, 1886)
- Cadra cautella (Walker, 1863)
- Calguia hapalanthes (Meyrick, 1932)
- Cataclysta cyanolitha (Meyrick, 1886)
- Cataclysta hexalitha Meyrick, 1886
- Ceratagra mitrophora Meyrick, 1932
- Ceratothalama argosema Meyrick, 1932
- Citripestis pectinicornella (Hampson, 1896)
- Cleticaula philographa Meyrick, 1937
- Corcyra cephalonica (Stainton, 1866)
- Cryptoblabes ardescens (Meyrick, 1929)
- Cryptoblabes gnidiella (Milliere, 1867)
- Cryptoblabes plagioleuca Turner, 1904
- Cryptoblabes sp. near spodopetina Tams [teste Dugdale, 1978]
- Cryptoblabes trabeata Meyrick, 1932
- Endotricha capnospila Meyrick, 1932
- Endotricha mesenterialis (Walker, 1859)
- Endotricha puncticostalis (Walker, 1866)
- Ephestia elutella (Hübner, 1796)
- Etiella behrii (Zeller, 1848)
- Etiella drososcia Meyrick, 1929
- Eurhodope holocapna Meyrick, 1932
- Eurhodope xanthosperma Meyrick, 1934
- Herculia fuscicostalis (Snellen van Vollenhoven, 1880)
- Herculia imbecilis (Moore, 1885)
- Homoeosoma cataphaea Meyrick, 1886
- Homoeosoma hypogypsa Meyrick, 1932
- Homoeosoma symmicta Meyrick, 1932
- Homoeosoma tepida Meyrick, 1932
- Hylopercnas eribolax Meyrick, 1934
- Hypantidium albicostale (Walker, 1863)
- Locastra ardua Swinhoe, 1902
- Maxillaria diaconopa Meyrick, 1934
- Mussidia pectinicornella (Hampson, 1896a)
- Nephopteryx exotypa Meyrick, 1933
- Nephopteryx porphyrocapna Meyrick, 1932
- Platycrates gypsopeda Meyrick, 1932
- Pyralis manihotalis Guenee, 1854
- Rhinaphe nigricostalis (Walker, 1863)
- Salebria eomichla Meyrick, 1934
- Spatulipalpia leucomichla Meyrick, 1934
- Spatulipalpia sideritis Meyrick, 1934
- Thalamorrhyncha zalorrhoa (Meyrick, 1934)
- Thialella escigera (Meyrick, 1932)
- Thialella rhodoptila Meyrick, 1932
- Tirathaba bachionophthalma Meyrick, 1934
- Tirathaba complexa (Butler, 1885)
- Tirathaba epichthonia Meyrick, 1937
- Tirathaba trichogramma (Meyrick, 1886)
- Tornocometis chrysospila Meyrick, 1934
- Trisson calathraea Meyrick, 1934
- Trisson leucosymbola Meyrick, 1932
- Vitessa vitialis Hampson, 1906

=== Saturniidae ===
- Opodiphthera eucalypti (Scott, 1864)

=== Sphingidae ===
- Agrius convolvuli (Linnaeus, 1758)
- Cephonodes armatus Rothschild & Jordan, 1903
- Daphnis placida torenia Druce, 1882
- Gnathothlibus erotus eras (Boisduval, 1832)
- Gnathothlibus fijiensis Lachlan, 2009
- Hippotion celerio (Linnaeus, 1758)
- Hippotion scrofa (Boisduval, 1832)
- Hippotion velox (Fabricius, 1793)
- Macroglossum corythus Walker, 1856
- Macroglossum godeffroyi (Butler, 1882)
- Macroglossum hirundo samoanum Rothschild & Jordan, 1906
- Macroglossum hirundo vitiense Rothschild & Jordan, 1903
- Psilogramma jordana Bethune-Baker, 1905
- Theretra nessus albata Fukuda, 2003
- Theretra nessus nessus (Drury, 1773)
- Theretra silhetensis intersecta (Butler, 1875)

=== Stathmopodidae ===
- Calicotis praeusta Meyrick, 1922
- Stathmopoda dracaenopa Meyrick, 1933
- Stathmopoda iocycla Meyrick, 1933
- Stathmopoda niphocarpa Meyrick, 1937
- Stathmopoda synchrysa Meyrick, 1923
- Stathmopoda trichrysa (Meyrick, 1920)
- Stathmopoda xanthodesma Meyrick, 1931

=== Thyrididae ===
- Banisia anthina bella Whalley, 1976
- Banisia myrtaea (Drury, 1773)
- Hypolamprus hemicycla (Meyrick, 1886)
- Morova subfasciata Walker, 1865
- Rhodoneura anticalis (Walker, 1866)
- Striglina scitaria Walker, 1862
- Striglina superior (Butler, 1887)

=== Tineidae ===
- Aeolarchis sphenotoma Meyrick, 1935
- Anastathma callichrysa Meyrick, 1886
- Anemerarcha entomaula Meyrick, 1937
- Catalectis drosoptila Meyrick, 1924
- Catalectis pharetropa Meyrick, 1920
- Catalectis ptilozona Meyrick, 1923
- Clepticodes clasmatica Meyrick, 1934
- Comodica disparata (Meyrick, 1923)
- Crypsithyrodes concolorella (Walker, 1863)
- Dryadaula terpsichorella (Busck, 1910)
- Dryadaula tetraglossa (Meyrick, 1920)
- Erechthias dissepta Meyrick, 1931
- Erechthias fibrivora (Meyrick, 1933)
- Erechthias flavistriata (Walsingham, 1907)
- Erechthias glyphidaula (Meyrick, 1933)
- Erechthias heterogramma (Meyrick, 1921)
- Erechthias minuscula (Walsingham, 1897)
- Erechthias psammaula (Meyrick, 1921)
- Erechthias simulans (Butler, 1882)
- Erechthias sisyranthes (Meyrick, 1930)
- Erechthias sphenacma Meyrick, 1926
- Erechthias subridens (Meyrick, 1923)
- Erechthias zebrina (Butler, 1881)
- Monopis pentadisca Meyrick, 1924
- Monopis stichomela Lower, 1900
- Opogona allaini Clarke, 1971
- Opogona amblyxena Meyrick, 1920
- Opogona aurisquamosa (Butler, 1881)
- Opogona citrinodes (Meyrick, 1922)
- Opogona dimidiatella Zeller, 1853
- Opogona hapalopa (Meyrick, 1922)
- Opogona regressa Meyrick, 1916
- Pherooe caverna (Meyrick, 1924)
- Proterospastis wainimbuka Robinson, 1980
- Pontodryas loxosema Meyrick, 1920
- Setomorpha rutella Zeller, 1852
- Tinea chlorospora Meyrick, 1924
- Tiquadra maculata (Meyrick, 1886)
- Trachycentra calamias Meyrick, 1886
- Trachycentra chlorogramma Meyrick, 1907
- Triadogona amphileucota Meyrick, 1937
- Trichophaga abruptella (Wollaston, 1858)

=== Tortricidae ===
- Acanthoclita defensa (Meyrick, 1922)
- Acanthoclita expulsa Razowski, 2016
- Acanthoclita trichograpta (Meyrick, 1911)
- Adoxophyes cyrtosema Meyrick 1886
- Adoxophyes fasciculana (Walker, 1866)
- Adoxophyes mixtior Razowski, 2016
- Adoxophyes privatana (Walker, 1863)
- Ancylis charisema Meyrick, 1934
- Aphrozestis scoriopa Meyrick, 1931
- Argyroploce immanis (Meyrick, 1886)
- Arotrophora fijigena Razowski, 2009
- Arotrophora tubulosa Razowski, 2009
- Atriscripta arithmetica (Meyrick, 1921)
- Atriscripta strigata Razowski, 2016
- Bactra angulata Diakonoff, 1956
- Bactra blepharopis Meyrick, 1911
- Bactra venosana (Zeller, 1847)
- Capua endocypha Meyrick, 1931
- Coenobiodes rubrogrisea Razowski, 2016
- Collogenes dascia (Bradley, 1962)
- Crocidosema plebejana Zeller, 1847
- Crocidosema lantana Busck, 1910
- Cryptophlebia emphyla Razowski, 2016
- Cryptophlebia illepida (Butler, 1882)
- Cryptophlebia ombrodelta (Lower, 1898)
- Cryptophlebia pallifimbriata Bradley, 1953
- Cryptophlebia repletana (Walker, 1863)
- Cryptophlebia rhynchias Meyrick, 1905
- Cryptophlebia sp. near amblyopa Clarke [teste Dugdale, 1978]
- Cryptophlebia vitiensis Bradley, 1953
- Diactenis orthometalla (Meyrick, 1922)
- Dichelopa lamii Razowski, 2016
- Dichelopa litota Razowski, 2016
- Dudua aprobola (Meyrick, 1886)
- Dudua lamiana Razowski, 2016
- Eccoptocera bidolon Razowski, 2016
- Eccoptocera platamon Razowski, 2016
- Epitrichosma metretoma Rasowski, 2016
- Eucosma baryphragma Meyrick, 1937
- Eucosma defensa Meyrick, 1922
- Eucosma eumarodes Meyrick, 1924
- Gnathmocerodes lecythocera (Meyrick, 1937)
- Grapholita trossulana Razowski, 2016
- Heleanna physalodes (Meyrick, 1926)
- Helictophanes prospera (Meyrick, 1909)
- Icelita grossoperas Razowski, 2016
- Leurogyia fijiensis Razowski, 2016
- Lobesia orthomorpha (Meyrick, 1928)
- Lobesia rhipidoma (Meyrick, 1925)
- Metaselena russata Razowski, 2016
- Metaselena ruborata Razowski, 2016
- Mimperiphoeba opaca Razowski, 2016
- Nairips mastrus Razowski, 2016
- Nesoscopa mesites Razowski, 2014
- Noduliferola cothovalva Razowoski, 2016
- Noduliferola neothela (Turner, 1916)
- Noduliferola transiens Razowoski, 2016
- Olethreutes anaprobola (Bradley, 1953)
- Olethreutes ancosema (Meyrick, 1932)
- Olethreutes pachypleura (Meyrick, 1924)
- Paratoonavora scalpta Razowski, 2016
- Peraglyphis eida Razowski, 2016
- Periphoeba adluminana Bradley, 1957
- Proactenis leucocharis (Meyrick, 1933)
- Procoronis swinhoeiana (Walsingham, 1890)
- Psegmatica pachnostola Meyrick, 1930
- Pseudancylis bisignum Razowski, 2016
- Pseudancylis rostrifera (Meyrick, 1912)
- Pteridoporthis euryloxa Meyrick, 1937
- Rhopobota ochyra Razowski, 2016
- Rhopobota splendida Clayton, 2017
- Semniotes halantha (Meyrick, 1909)
- Spilonota cryptogramma Meyrick, 1922
- Spilonota lygaea Razowski, 2016
- Spilonota pachyspina Razowski, 2016
- Statherotis ancosema (Meyrick, 1932)
- Statherotis leucaspis (Meyrick, 1902)
- Strepsicrates ejectana (Walker, 1863)
- Strepsicrates glaucothoe (Meyrick, 1927)
- Strepsicrates poliophora Bradley, 1962
- Syncratus nairayawae Razowski, 2016
- Teleta talaris (Durrant, 1915)
- Thaumatotibia grammica Razoswki, 2016
- Thaumatotibia zophophanes (Turner,1946)
- Tortrix leucocharis Meyrick, 1933
- Tritopterna cnephata Razowski, 2016
- Trymalitis cataracta Meyrick, 1907
- Trymalitis macarista Meyrick, 1934
- Trymalitis optima Meyrick, 1911
- Xenothictis atriflora Meyrick, 1930

=== Uraniidae ===
- Urapteroides anerces (Meyrick, 1886)
- Urapteroides hermaea (Druce, 1888)

=== Yponomeutidae ===
- Atteva aleatrix Meyrick, 1922
- Bedellia somnulentella Zeller, 1847
- Callithrinca niphopyrrha Meyrick, 1927
- Caminophantis mystolitha Meyrick, 1933
- Prays citri Millière, 1873

=== Zyganeidae ===
- Heteropan dolens Druce, 1888
- Levuana iridescens Bethune-Baker, 1906
