= Pigeonpea pod borer =

Pigeonpea pod borer is a common name for several insects with larvae that feed on pigeonpeas and may refer to:

- Ancylostomia stercorea, native to the Americas
- Etanna breviuscula (syn. Nanaguna breviuscula), native to Australia and Asia

== See also ==
- Helicoverpa armigera, another species that feeds on pigeonpeas
