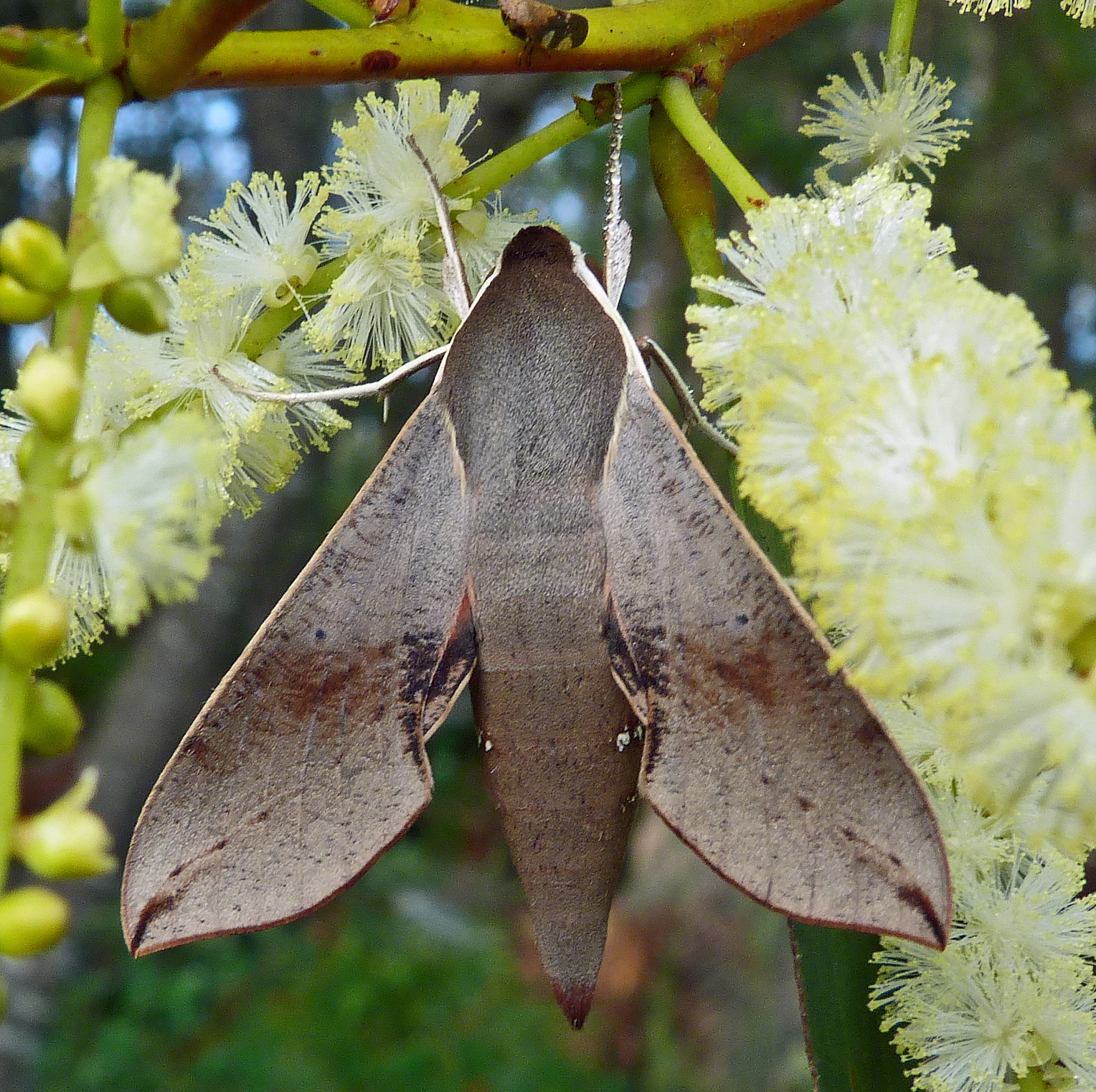

Scientific classification
- Kingdom: Animalia
- Phylum: Arthropoda
- Class: Insecta
- Order: Lepidoptera
- Family: Sphingidae
- Genus: Hippotion
- Species: H. scrofa

Binomial name
- Hippotion scrofa (Boisduval, 1832)

Synonyms
- Deilephila scrofa Boisduval, 1832; Chaerocampa scrofa Walker, 1856; Chaerocampa bernardus Koch, 1865; Chaerocampa ignea Butler, 1875; Deilephila porcia Wallengren, 1860

= Hippotion scrofa =

Species of moth

Hippotion scrofa is a moth of the family Sphingidae.

== Distribution ==
It is found in Australia, New Caledonia and Vanuatu.

== Description ==
The wingspan is about 70 mm. It is similar to Hippotion brennus and Hippotion joiceyi but distinguishable from the former by the lack of paired subdorsal white spots on the abdomen and from the latter by the lack of a dorsal white median line on the thorax.

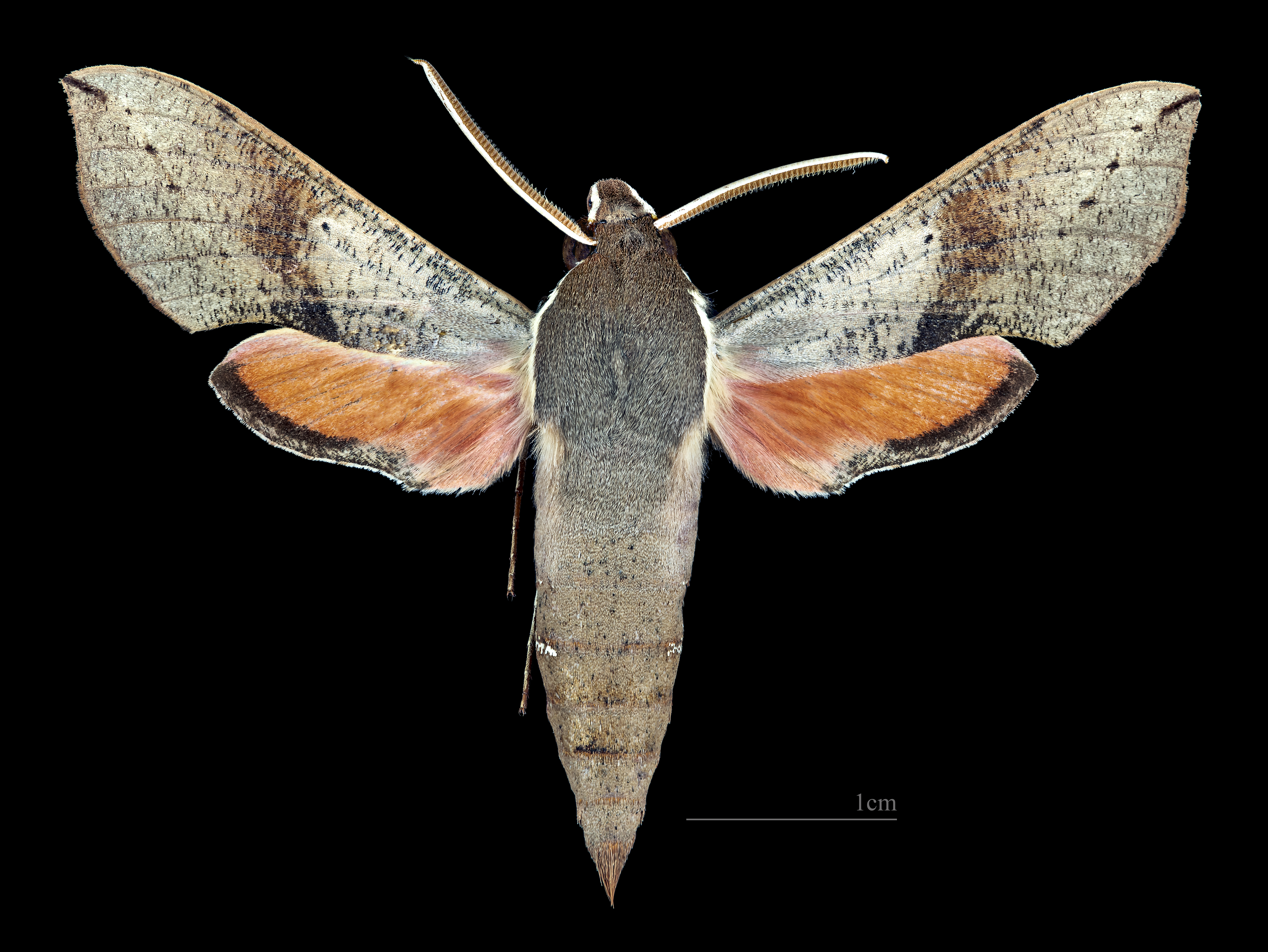
Male dorsal

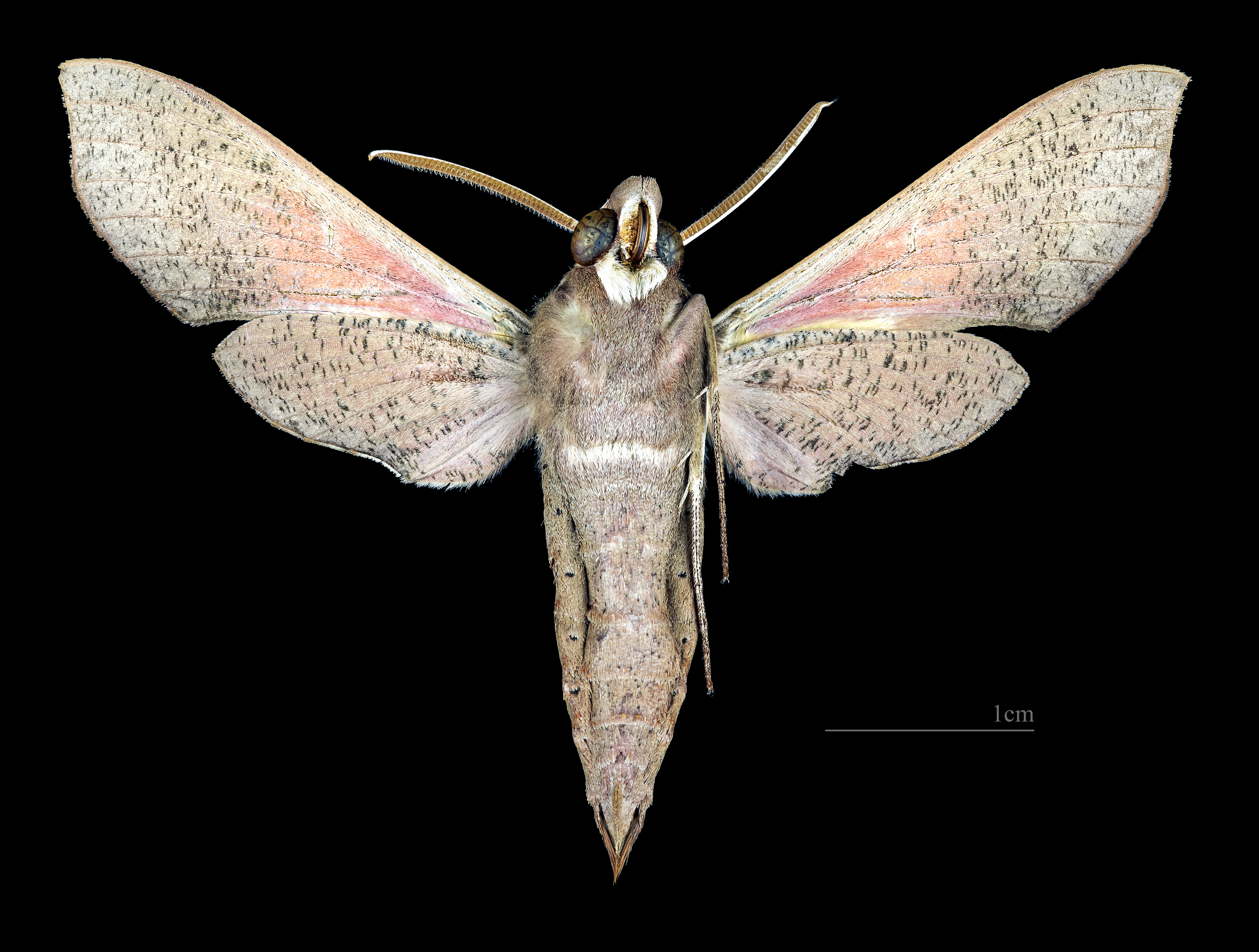
Male ventral

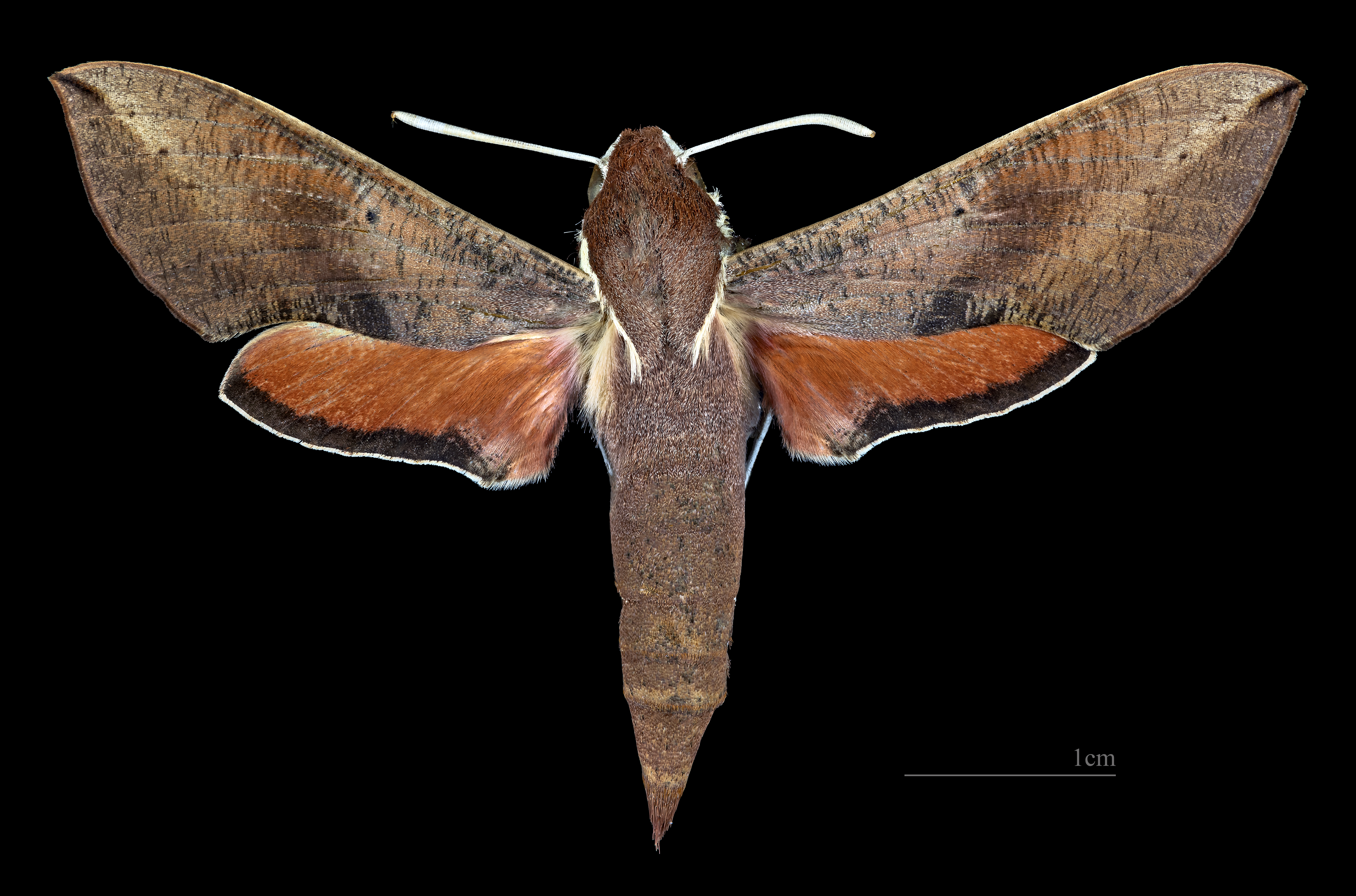
Female dorsal

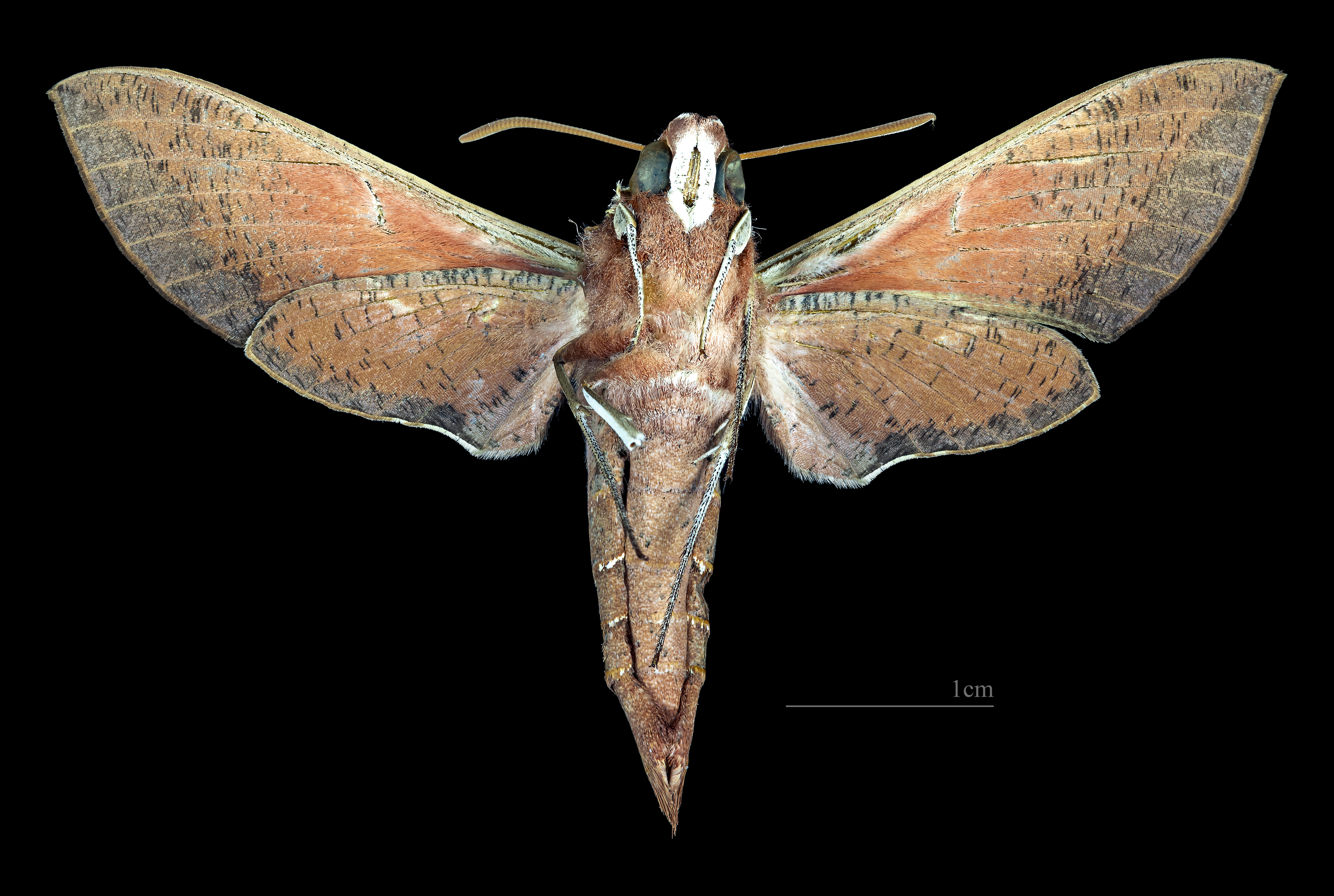
Female ventral

== Biology ==
Larvae feed on Epilobium, Coprosma repens, Ipomoea and Fuchsia.
