= Polyura caphontis =

- In Hewitson's Illustrations of New Species of Exotic Butterflies

Scientific classification
- Kingdom: Animalia
- Phylum: Arthropoda
- Clade: Pancrustacea
- Class: Insecta
- Order: Lepidoptera
- Family: Nymphalidae
- Genus: Charaxes
- Species: C. caphontis

Binomial name
- Charaxes caphontis (Hewitson, 1863)

Synonyms
- Polyura caphontis

Species of butterfly

Charaxes (Polyura) caphontis is a butterfly in the family Nymphalidae. It was described by William Chapman Hewitson in 1863. It is endemic to Fiji. The only species of the genus [Eriboea (Polyura pars]with a reddish-brown double-row on the upper surface of the hindwings. The under surface of the male is dark chestnut brown, of the female greyish-brown. The markings of the upper surface are repeated, except the greenish band of the hindwings, which, moreover, in the female consists only of a thin line on the upper surface. Flying time according to Woodford in November, the rainy period, in the Fidji Islands. According to Rothschild and Jordan there are also males with a yellowish median band being distinctly pronounced also on the under surface of the hindwing

== Subspecies ==
- C. c. caphontis (Viti Levu Island, Ovalu Island, Taveuni Island)
- C. c. nambavatua Smiles, 1982 (Vanua Mbbalavu Island)
