= Pontodryas =

Scientific classification
- Kingdom: Animalia
- Phylum: Arthropoda
- Clade: Pancrustacea
- Class: Insecta
- Order: Lepidoptera
- Family: Tineidae
- Genus: Pontodryas
- Species: P. loxosema

Binomial name
- Pontodryas loxosema Meyrick, 1920

Genus of moths

Pontodryas is a genus of moths belonging to the family Tineidae.

This genus contains only one species, Pontodryas loxosema Meyrick, 1920 from Fiji.
