= Tinea chlorospora =

Scientific classification
- Kingdom: Animalia
- Phylum: Arthropoda
- Class: Insecta
- Order: Lepidoptera
- Family: Tineidae
- Genus: Tinea
- Species: T. chlorospora

Binomial name
- Tinea chlorospora Meyrick, 1924

Species of moth

Tinea chlorospora is a moth of the family Tineidae. It was described by Edward Meyrick in 1924. It is found on Fiji.
