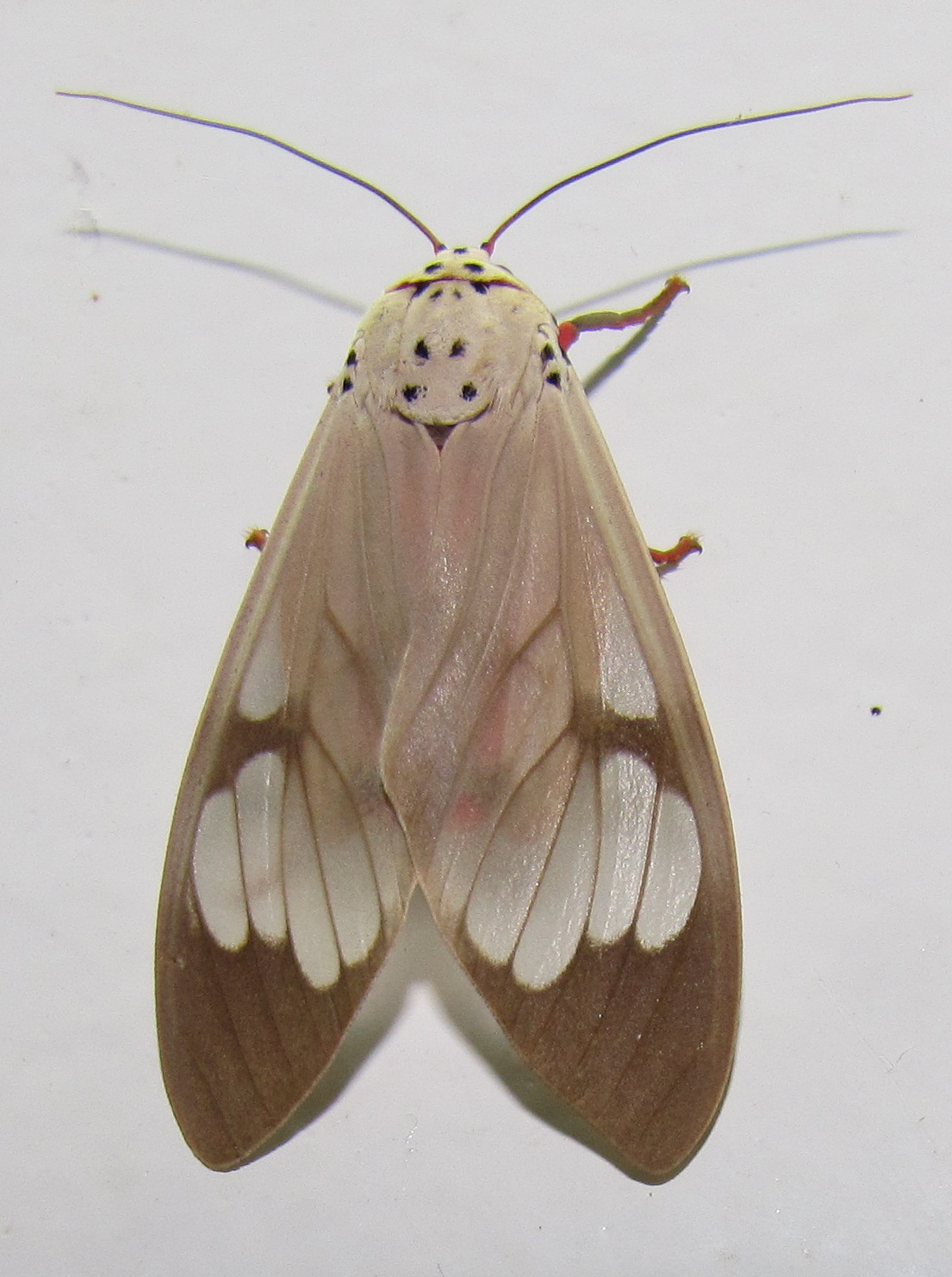

Scientific classification
- Kingdom: Animalia
- Phylum: Arthropoda
- Clade: Pancrustacea
- Class: Insecta
- Order: Lepidoptera
- Superfamily: Noctuoidea
- Family: Erebidae
- Subfamily: Arctiinae
- Genus: Amerila
- Species: A. astreus

Binomial name
- Amerila astreus (Drury, 1773)

Synonyms
- Sphinx astreus Drury, 1773; Rhodogastria astreus; Rhodogastria astraea (misspelling); Rhodogastria astrea (misspelling); Phalaena melanthus Cramer, 1780; Rhodogastria astreas hainana Rothschild, 1910; Creatonotos communis Walker, 1864; Rhodogastria astreus communis (Walker, 1864 [1865]); Rhodogastria astreus curtisi Rothschild, 1910; Rhodogastria astreus dohertyi Rothschild, 1914; Rhodogastria astreus druryi Rothschild, 1914; Rhodogastria astreus novaeguineae Rothschild, 1914; Rhodogastria communis minor Rothschild, 1916

= Amerila astreus =

Species of moth

Amerila astreus is a moth of subfamily Arctiinae described by Dru Drury in 1773. It is found from the Oriental region (including India, Sri Lanka) to New Guinea. The species is found in primary and secondary habitats ranging from lowlands to montane regions.

== Description ==
Its palpi are crimson, with a black spot on each joint. Antennae red brown, with the basal joint crimson. Head and thorax whitish fuscous, the head with two black spots. Collar with two pairs of spots. Three segments of thorax are each with a pair of spots. Forewings with hyaline (glass like), with two black spots at the base. The margins, apical area, and a band on discocellulars pale fuscous. Hindwings hyaline, with a marginal fuscous band. Legs crimson, with the outer side of the femora and tibia whitish fuscous. Larva greenish with slightly hairy body. There are sub-dorsal and lateral rows of small black spots. Spiracles brownish. Head yellow.

== Subspecies ==
- Amerila astreus astreus
- Amerila astreus communis (Walker, 1864)
- Amerila astreus curtisi (Rothschild, 1910)
- Amerila astreus novaeguineae (Rothschild, 1914)
