= Cosmopterix gloriosa =

Scientific classification
- Kingdom: Animalia
- Phylum: Arthropoda
- Class: Insecta
- Order: Lepidoptera
- Family: Cosmopterigidae
- Genus: Cosmopterix
- Species: C. gloriosa

Binomial name
- Cosmopterix gloriosa Meyrick, 1922

Synonyms
- Cosmopteryx gloriosa

Species of moth

Cosmopterix gloriosa is a moth in the family Cosmopterigidae. It was described by Edward Meyrick in 1922. It is found on Fiji.
