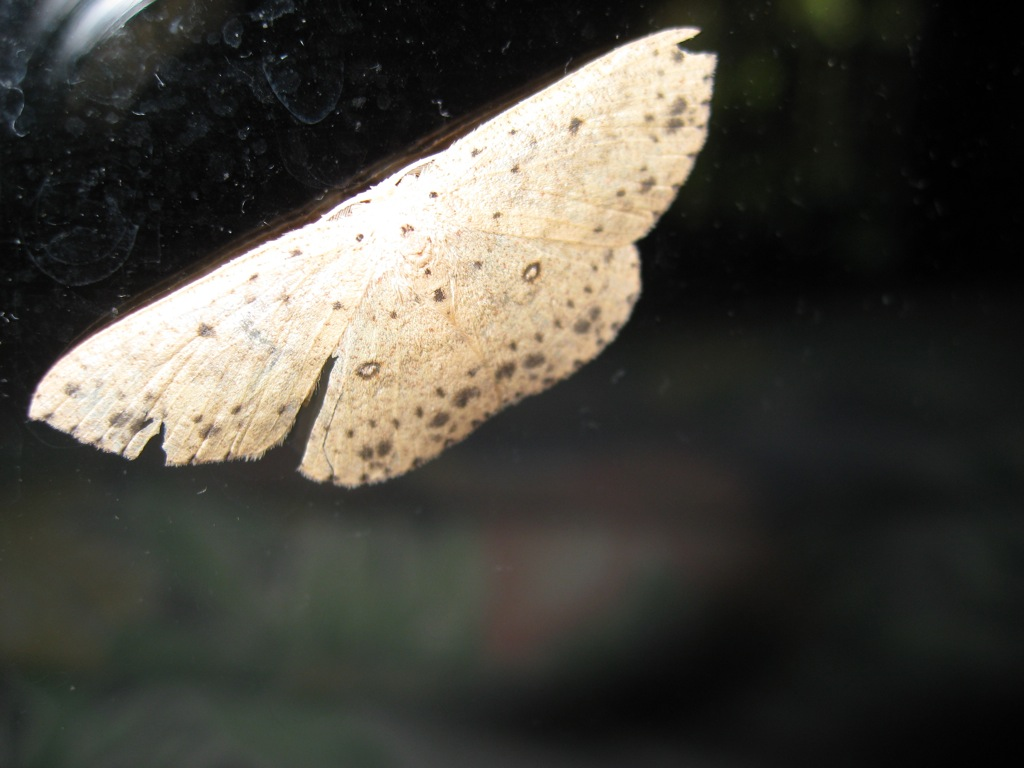

Scientific classification
- Kingdom: Animalia
- Phylum: Arthropoda
- Clade: Pancrustacea
- Class: Insecta
- Order: Lepidoptera
- Family: Geometridae
- Genus: Perixera
- Species: P. porphyropis

Binomial name
- Perixera porphyropis Meyrick, 1888

Synonyms
- Anisodes porphyropis (Meyrick, 1888); Anisodes porphyropis simplex L. B. Prout, 1938; Anisodes porphyropis mediusta L. B. Prout, 1938; Anisodes meniscata L. B. Prout, 1938

= Perixera porphyropis =

Species of moth

Perixera porphyropis is a moth in the family Geometridae first described by Edward Meyrick in 1888. It is found in Australia. Records from Fiji are considered erroneous.
