= Asymphorodes flexa =

Scientific classification
- Kingdom: Animalia
- Phylum: Arthropoda
- Clade: Pancrustacea
- Class: Insecta
- Order: Lepidoptera
- Family: Cosmopterigidae
- Genus: Asymphorodes
- Species: A. flexa

Binomial name
- Asymphorodes flexa (Meyrick, 1921)

Synonyms
- Stagmatophora flexa Meyrick, 1921

Species of moth

Asymphorodes flexa is a moth in the family Agonoxenidae. It is found on Fiji.
