= Cosmopterix epizona =

Scientific classification
- Kingdom: Animalia
- Phylum: Arthropoda
- Class: Insecta
- Order: Lepidoptera
- Family: Cosmopterigidae
- Genus: Cosmopterix
- Species: C. epizona

Binomial name
- Cosmopterix epizona (Meyrick, 1897)

Synonyms
- Cosmopteryx epizona Meyrick, 1897

Species of moth

Cosmopterix epizona is a moth of the family Cosmopterigidae. It is known from Australia and Fiji.
