= Sigillictystis encteta =

Scientific classification
- Kingdom: Animalia
- Phylum: Arthropoda
- Clade: Pancrustacea
- Class: Insecta
- Order: Lepidoptera
- Family: Geometridae
- Genus: Sigilliclystis
- Species: S. encteta

Binomial name
- Sigilliclystis encteta (Prout, 1934)

Synonyms
- Chloroclystis encteta Prout, 1934

Species of moth

Sigillictystis encteta is a moth in the family Geometridae. It is found on Fiji, Vanuatu, Samoa and the Cook Islands.
