= Tholocoleus =

Scientific classification
- Domain: Eukaryota
- Kingdom: Animalia
- Phylum: Arthropoda
- Class: Insecta
- Order: Lepidoptera
- Superfamily: Noctuoidea
- Family: Erebidae
- Subfamily: Herminiinae
- Genus: Tholocoleus; Robinson, 1975
- Species: T. astrifer

Binomial name
- Tholocoleus astrifer (Butler, 1886)

Synonyms
- Lophocoleus astrifer Butler, 1886

Genus of moths

Tholocoleus is a monotypic moth genus of the family Erebidae described by Robinson in 1975. Its only species, Tholocoleus astrifer, was first described by Arthur Gardiner Butler in 1886. It is known from Fiji.
