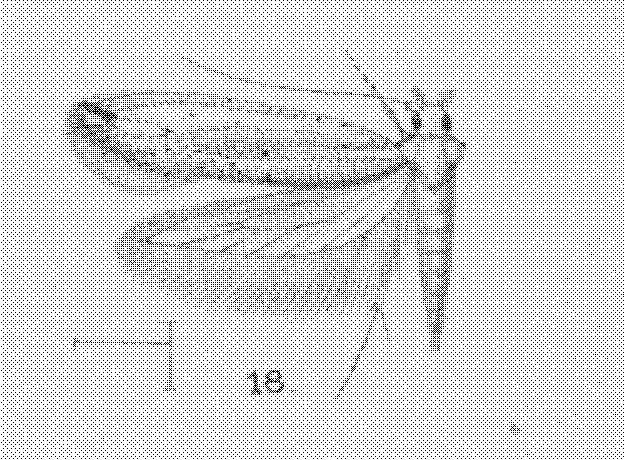

Scientific classification
- Kingdom: Animalia
- Phylum: Arthropoda
- Clade: Pancrustacea
- Class: Insecta
- Order: Lepidoptera
- Family: Tineidae
- Genus: Erechthias
- Species: E. flavistriata

Binomial name
- Erechthias flavistriata (Walsingham, 1907)

Synonyms
- Ereunetis flavistriata Walsingham, 1907; Decadarchis euophthalma Meyrick, 1924; Decadarchis methodica Meyrick, 1911; Decadarchis scorpiura Meyrick, 1931; Erechthias lampadacma Meyrick, 1921

= Erechthias flavistriata =

Sugarcane bud moth

Species of moth

Erechthias flavistriata, the sugarcane bud moth, is a moth of the family Tineidae. It was described by Lord Walsingham in 1907 from a specimen collected in Hawaii, but it is probably an introduced species. It is found in large parts of the Pacific Rim, including New Zealand, the Cook Islands, the Marquesas, Rapa Iti, Fiji, the New Hebrides, the Kermadec Islands, the Solomons, Java and Malaya. People have spread it widely and have travelled to many islands throughout much of the Pacific.

== Taxonomy ==
Walsingham first described this species in 1907 and initially named it Ereunetis flavistriata. Edward Meyrick placed this species in the genus Erechthias in 1915.

== Description ==
Walsingham first described this species as follows:

Antennae yellowish white, with two small grey spots above before the apex. Palpi are yellowish white and brush-like beneath; the terminal joint is very short. Head and Thorax yellowish white. Forewings yellowish white, indistinctly streaked with broken yellow lines along the fold, along the cell, and below the costa beyond the middle; also sparsely speckled with black scales, especially beyond the middle; a short blackish streak at the upturned apex runs to the end of the apical cilia and is joined by a slender golden brown streak along the base of the shining, white costal cilia; terminal cilia whitish cinereous, with a blackish spot in their middle below the apex. Exp. al. 14 mm. Hindwings are shining, pale golden yellowish, becoming white at the apex; cilia are pale yellowish grey. Abdomen and Legs are yellowish white.

== Biology ==
Larvae have been recorded feeding on bananas, coconuts and other palms, as well as Pandanus species, pineapples and sugarcane. The full-grown larva is about 12 to 15 mm.

== Interactions with humans ==
This species is a declared pest in Western Australia.

The larvae of this species are regarded as a pest of sugarcane. It has been described by O.H. Swezey as follows:

It is usually not particularly injurious as it customarily feeds on the dead and drying tissues of the leaf-sheaths of sugar cane; but when very numerous and on particularly soft varieties of cane the caterpillars do considerable damage eating of the epidermis, and also eat into the buds and destroy them, occasioning a good deal of loss where the cane is desired for cuttings to plant.
