= Palaeocoleus =

Scientific classification
- Domain: Eukaryota
- Kingdom: Animalia
- Phylum: Arthropoda
- Class: Insecta
- Order: Lepidoptera
- Superfamily: Noctuoidea
- Family: Erebidae
- Subfamily: Herminiinae
- Genus: Palaeocoleus; Robinson, 1975
- Species: P. sypnoides

Binomial name
- Palaeocoleus sypnoides (Butler, 1886)

Synonyms
- Bocana sypnoides Butler, 1886

Genus of moths

Palaeocoleus is a monotypic moth genus of the family Erebidae described by Robinson in 1975. Its only species, Palaeocoleus sypnoides, was first described by Arthur Gardiner Butler in 1886. It is found in Fiji.
