= Dichromia quinqualis =

Scientific classification
- Kingdom: Animalia
- Phylum: Arthropoda
- Class: Insecta
- Order: Lepidoptera
- Superfamily: Noctuoidea
- Family: Erebidae
- Genus: Dichromia
- Species: D. quinqualis

Binomial name
- Dichromia quinqualis Walker, 1859

Synonyms
- Hypena duplicalis Walker, 1859; Hypena quinqualis

Species of moth

Dichromia quinqualis is a moth of the family Erebidae first described by Francis Walker in 1859. It is found in the South Pacific including: Fiji, Queensland and Java.

== Biology ==
The larvae feed on Cynanchum elegans, an Apocynaceae.
