= Cosmopterix dulcivora =

Scientific classification
- Domain: Eukaryota
- Kingdom: Animalia
- Phylum: Arthropoda
- Class: Insecta
- Order: Lepidoptera
- Family: Cosmopterigidae
- Genus: Cosmopterix
- Species: C. dulcivora

Binomial name
- Cosmopterix dulcivora Meyrick, 1919

Synonyms
- Cosmopterix sublaetifica Kuroko, 1982

Species of moth

Cosmopterix dulcivora is a moth of the family Cosmopterigidae. It is known from China (Jiangxi), Japan, Fiji, Samoa, the Philippines (Negros), Java, Australia (Queensland), and Russia.

The length of the forewings is about 5 mm. The larvae have been recorded feeding on Poaceae species, including Miscanthus sinensis in Japan and Saccharum officinarum in Fiji, the Philippines and Queensland.
