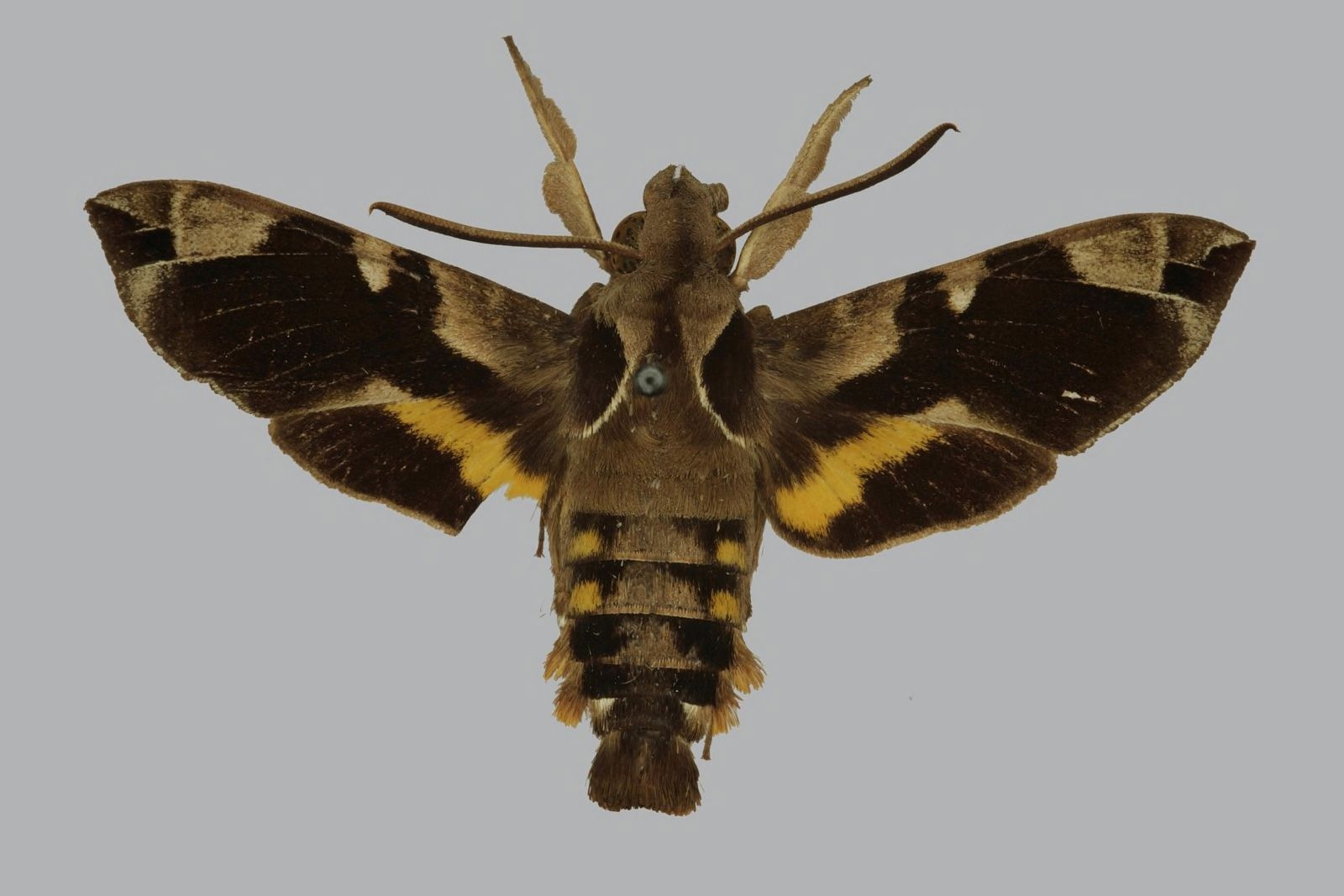

Scientific classification
- Kingdom: Animalia
- Phylum: Arthropoda
- Class: Insecta
- Order: Lepidoptera
- Family: Sphingidae
- Genus: Macroglossum
- Species: M. godeffroyi

Binomial name
- Macroglossum godeffroyi Butler, 1882

= Macroglossum godeffroyi =

Species of moth

Macroglossum godeffroyi is a moth of the family Sphingidae. It is known from Fiji.

This species is distinguished from all other Sphingidae by the presence of tufts of long hairs on the mid- and hind-tibia, similar to those of the abdominal scent organ. The abdomen has very prominent dorso-lateral black spots. The forewing upperside antemedian band is very broad, touching a large disco-marginal area of the same colour, the discocellular veins within the band thus separating the grey median area into a costal and posterior patch.
