= Adetoneura =

Scientific classification
- Domain: Eukaryota
- Kingdom: Animalia
- Phylum: Arthropoda
- Class: Insecta
- Order: Lepidoptera
- Superfamily: Noctuoidea
- Family: Erebidae
- Subfamily: Lymantriinae
- Genus: Adetoneura; Collenette, 1933
- Species: A. lentiginosa

Binomial name
- Adetoneura lentiginosa Collenette, 1933

Synonyms
- Euproctis mimetica Robinson, 1969

Genus of moths

Adetoneura is a monotypic moth genus in the subfamily Lymantriinae. Its only species, Adetoneura lentiginosa, is found on Fiji. Both the genus and the species were first described by Cyril Leslie Collenette in 1933.
