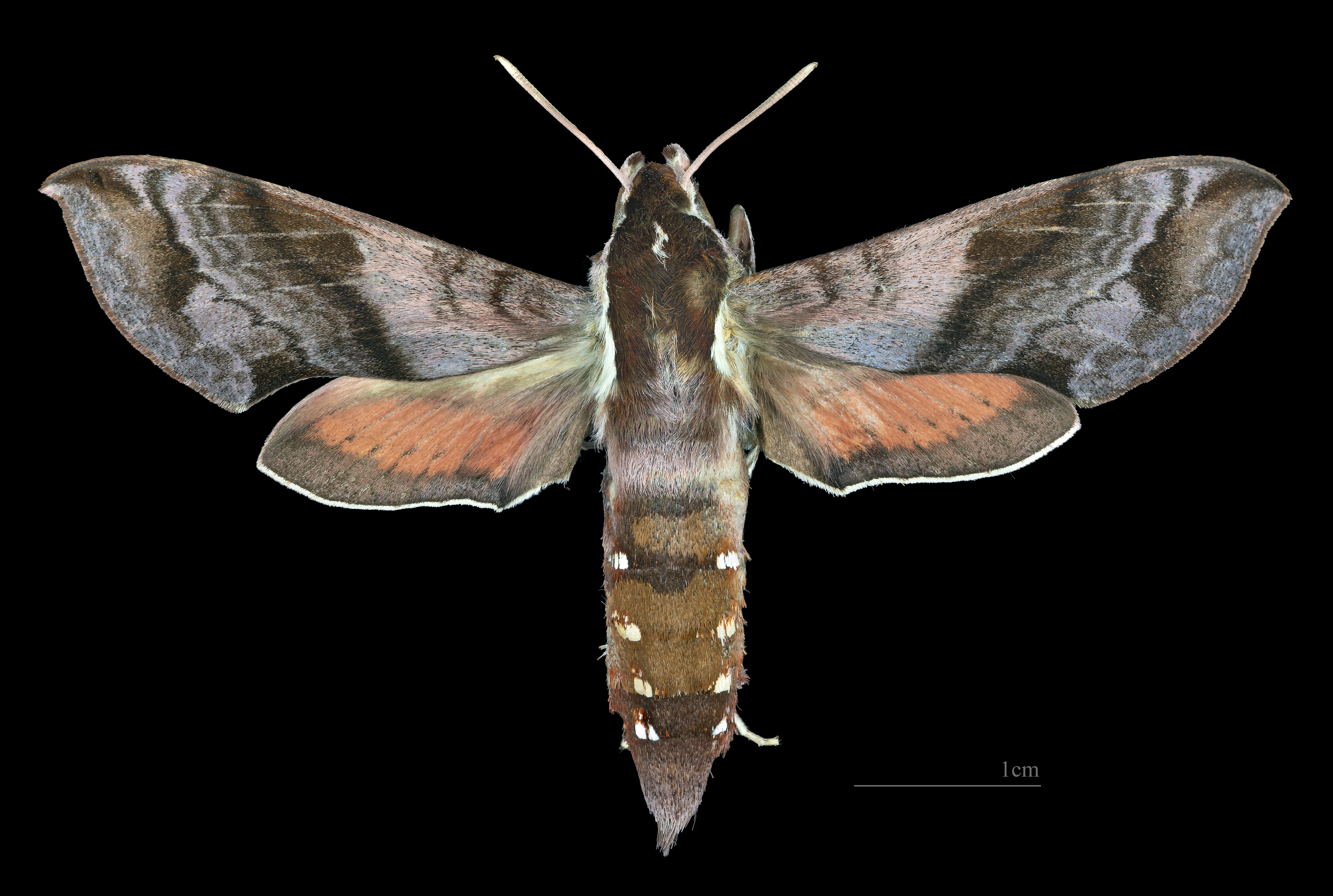
- female dorsal
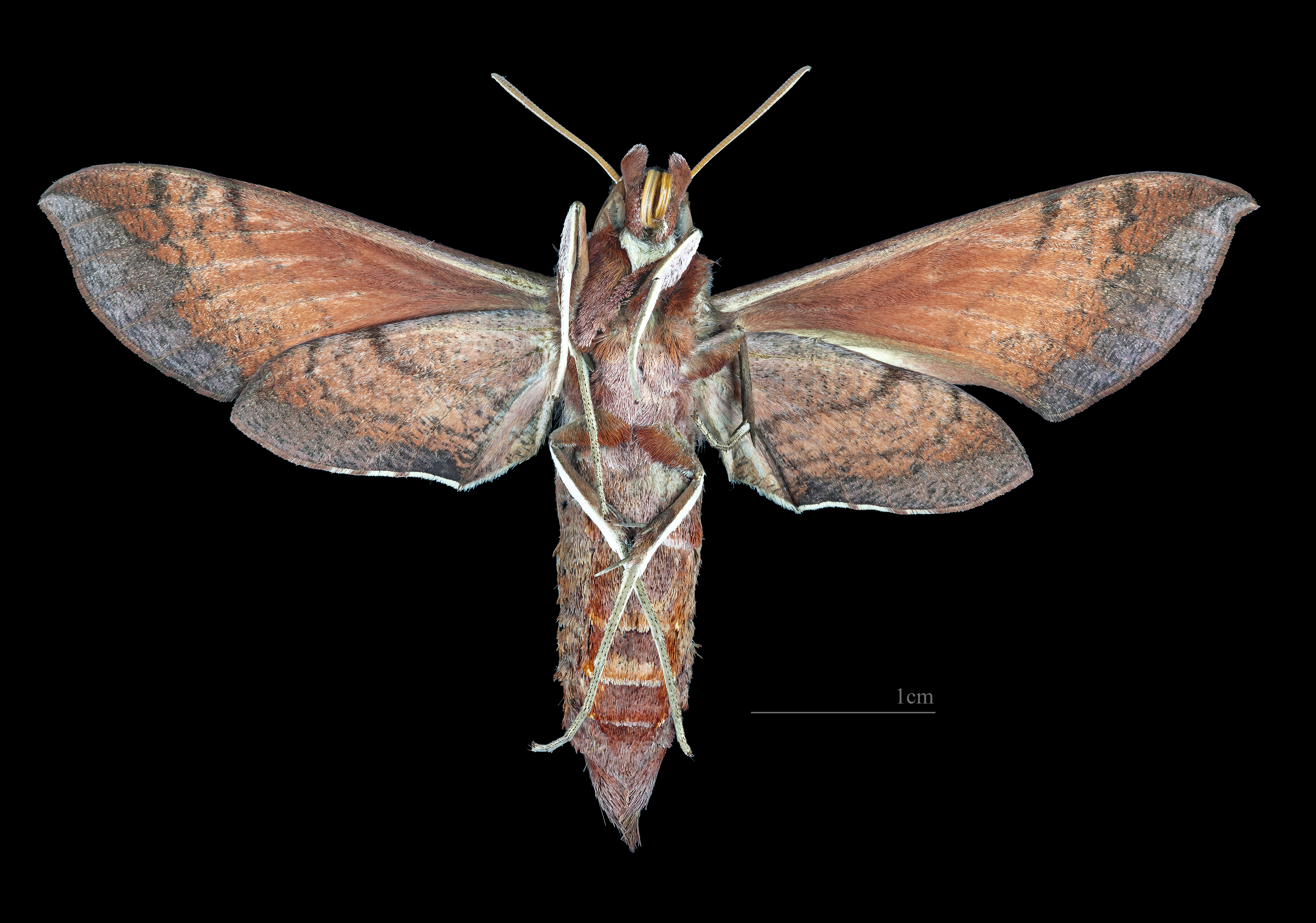
- female ventral

Scientific classification
- Kingdom: Animalia
- Phylum: Arthropoda
- Class: Insecta
- Order: Lepidoptera
- Family: Sphingidae
- Genus: Hippotion
- Species: H. brennus

Binomial name
- Hippotion brennus (Stoll, 1782)

Synonyms
- Sphinx brennus Stoll, 1782; Panacra maculiventris Miskin, 1891; Chaerocampa johanna Kirby, 1877; Hippotion rubribrenna Joicey & Kaye, 1917; Hippotion novaebrittaniae Clark, 1932; Hippotion brennus viettei Darge, 1975; Hippotion brennus funebris Gehlen, 1926

= Hippotion brennus =

Species of moth

Hippotion brennus is a moth of the family Sphingidae. It is known from the Moluccas, Papua New Guinea, the Solomon Islands and north-eastern Australia.
