= Stictea glaucothoe =

Scientific classification
- Kingdom: Animalia
- Phylum: Arthropoda
- Class: Insecta
- Order: Lepidoptera
- Family: Tortricidae
- Genus: Stictea
- Species: S. glaucothoe

Binomial name
- Stictea glaucothoe (Meyrick, 1927)

Synonyms
- Spilonota glaucothoe Meyrick, 1927; Strepsicrates glaucothoe; Eucosma baryphragma Meyrick, 1937

Species of moth

Stictea glaucothoe is a moth of the family Tortricidae. It was described by Edward Meyrick in 1927. It is found on Fiji and Samoa.
