= Ptochosiphla =

Scientific classification
- Kingdom: Animalia
- Phylum: Arthropoda
- Class: Insecta
- Order: Lepidoptera
- Superfamily: Noctuoidea
- Family: Erebidae
- Subfamily: Hypeninae
- Genus: Ptochosiphla; Meyrick, 1933
- Species: P. oedipus

Binomial name
- Ptochosiphla oedipus Meyrick, 1933

Genus of moths

Ptochosiphla is a monotypic moth genus of the family Erebidae. Its only species, Ptochosiphla oedipus, is found in Fiji. Both the genus and the species were first described by Edward Meyrick in 1933.
