= Erechthias glyphidaula =

Scientific classification
- Kingdom: Animalia
- Phylum: Arthropoda
- Clade: Pancrustacea
- Class: Insecta
- Order: Lepidoptera
- Family: Tineidae
- Genus: Erechthias
- Species: E. glyphidaula

Binomial name
- Erechthias glyphidaula (Meyrick, 1933)

Synonyms
- Amphisyncentris glyphidaula Meyrick, 1933; Triadogona amphileucota Meyrick, 1937; Anemerarcha entomaula Meyrick, 1937

Species of moth

Erechthias glyphidaula is a moth of the family Tineidae. It was described by Edward Meyrick in 1933. It is found on Fiji.
