= Cosmopterix chrysocrates =

Scientific classification
- Kingdom: Animalia
- Phylum: Arthropoda
- Class: Insecta
- Order: Lepidoptera
- Family: Cosmopterigidae
- Genus: Cosmopterix
- Species: C. chrysocrates

Binomial name
- Cosmopterix chrysocrates Meyrick, 1919

Synonyms
- Cosmopteryx chrysocrates

Species of moth

Cosmopterix chrysocrates is a moth in the family Cosmopterigidae. It was described by Edward Meyrick in 1919. It is found on Fiji.
