= Scopula julietae =

Scientific classification
- Domain: Eukaryota
- Kingdom: Animalia
- Phylum: Arthropoda
- Class: Insecta
- Order: Lepidoptera
- Family: Geometridae
- Genus: Scopula
- Species: S. julietae

Binomial name
- Scopula julietae Robinson, 1975

Species of geometer moth in subfamily Sterrhinae

Scopula julietae is a moth of the family Geometridae. It is endemic to Fiji.
