= Scopula sublinearia =

Scientific classification
- Kingdom: Animalia
- Phylum: Arthropoda
- Class: Insecta
- Order: Lepidoptera
- Family: Geometridae
- Genus: Scopula
- Species: S. sublinearia

Binomial name
- Scopula sublinearia (Walker, 1866)

Synonyms
- Acidalia sublinearia Walker, 1866

Species of geometer moth in subfamily Sterrhinae

Scopula sublinearia is a moth of the family Geometridae. It is found in Australia (Queensland), the Louisiade Archipelago and Fiji.

== Subspecies ==
- Scopula sublinearia sublinearia (Australia)
- Scopula sublinearia ida Robinson, 1975 (Fiji)
- Scopula sublinearia massimensis Prout, 1938 (Louisiade Archipelago)
