= Ceratagra =

Scientific classification
- Kingdom: Animalia
- Phylum: Arthropoda
- Clade: Pancrustacea
- Class: Insecta
- Order: Lepidoptera
- Family: Pyralidae
- Subfamily: Phycitinae
- Genus: Ceratagra; Meyrick, 1932
- Species: C. mitrophora

Binomial name
- Ceratagra mitrophora Meyrick, 1932

Genus of moths

Ceratagra is a monotypic snout moth genus. Its only species, Ceratagra mitrophora, is found in Fiji. Both the genus and species were first described by Edward Meyrick in 1932.
