= Eupithecia vermiculata =

Scientific classification
- Kingdom: Animalia
- Phylum: Arthropoda
- Class: Insecta
- Order: Lepidoptera
- Family: Geometridae
- Genus: Eupithecia
- Species: E. vermiculata

Binomial name
- Eupithecia vermiculata Snellen, 1874

Species of moth

Eupithecia vermiculata is a moth in the family Geometridae. It is found in Colombia.
