= Syllepte cohaesalis =

Scientific classification
- Kingdom: Animalia
- Phylum: Arthropoda
- Class: Insecta
- Order: Lepidoptera
- Family: Crambidae
- Genus: Syllepte
- Species: S. cohaesalis

Binomial name
- Syllepte cohaesalis (Walker, 1866)

Synonyms
- Botys cohaesalis Walker, 1866; Coptobasis biocellata Warren, 1896

Species of moth

Syllepte cohaesalis is a moth in the family Crambidae. It was described by Francis Walker in 1866. It is found in Indonesia (Sula Islands, Tanimbar Islands), India and on Fiji.
