= Atasthalistis hieropla =

Scientific classification
- Domain: Eukaryota
- Kingdom: Animalia
- Phylum: Arthropoda
- Class: Insecta
- Order: Lepidoptera
- Family: Gelechiidae
- Genus: Atasthalistis
- Species: A. hieropla

Binomial name
- Atasthalistis hieropla Meyrick, 1919

Synonyms
- Dichomeris hieropla

Species of moth

Atasthalistis hieropla is a moth in the family Gelechiidae. It was described by Edward Meyrick in 1919. It is found in Fiji.

The wingspan is about 19 mm. The forewings are purple blackish with a rather broad whitish-yellow streak just below the costa from the base, somewhat sinuate away from the costa beyond the middle, and terminating on the costa at three-fourths. Beyond this is a white marginal line running around the costa and termen to the tornus, twice interrupted on the costa. The hindwings are bright deep orange.
