= Acrocercops macroclina =

Scientific classification
- Kingdom: Animalia
- Phylum: Arthropoda
- Class: Insecta
- Order: Lepidoptera
- Family: Gracillariidae
- Genus: Acrocercops
- Species: A. macroclina

Binomial name
- Acrocercops macroclina Meyrick, 1916

Species of moth

Acrocercops macroclina is a moth of the family Gracillariidae, known from Karnataka, India, as well as Fiji and Malaysia. It was described by Edward Meyrick in 1915. The hostplants for the species include Caesalpinia bonduc, Derris elliptica, and Moullava spicata.
