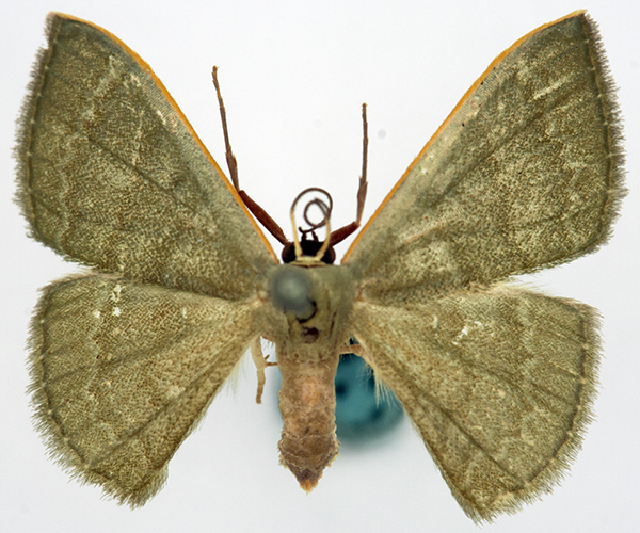
- Symmacra solidaria ochrea

Scientific classification
- Kingdom: Animalia
- Phylum: Arthropoda
- Class: Insecta
- Order: Lepidoptera
- Family: Geometridae
- Genus: Symmacra; Warren, 1896
- Species: S. solidaria

Binomial name
- Symmacra solidaria (Guenée, 1858)

Synonyms
- Nemoria solidaria Guenée, 1857; Acidalia quadraequata Walker, 1861; Thalassodes validaria Walker, 1866; Jodis thalassica Moore, 1887; Sterrha (?) baptata Warren, 1897; Mnesithetis ochrea Warren, 1897; Geometra rufifrontaria Hampson, 1907

= Symmacra =

Genus of moths

Symmacra is a monotypic moth genus in the family Geometridae described by Warren in 1896. Its only species, Symmacra solidaria, was first described by Achille Guenée in 1858. It is found in Indo-Australian tropics of India, Sri Lanka, Borneo east to Fiji, Samoa and Australia.

Its wingspan is about 2 cm. The adult has dull olive-green wings with faint transverse fasciations. In the hindwing, a discal mark consists or a centrally broken fine white bar.

Four subspecies are recognized:

- Symmacra solidaria baptata Warren, 1897
- Symmacra solidaria ochrea Warren, 1897
- Symmacra solidaria sinensis Prout, 1935
- Symmacra solidaria validaria Walker, 1866
