= Coleophora seminalis =

Scientific classification
- Kingdom: Animalia
- Phylum: Arthropoda
- Class: Insecta
- Order: Lepidoptera
- Family: Coleophoridae
- Genus: Coleophora
- Species: C. seminalis

Binomial name
- Coleophora seminalis Meyrick, 1921

Synonyms
- Coleophora immortalis Meyrick, 1922

Species of moth

Coleophora seminalis is a moth of the family Coleophoridae. It is found in Australia (most areas of Queensland north of Yeppoon), New Guinea, Malesia (Java, Sumatra), Fiji and eastern China.

The wingspan is about 10 mm.

The larvae feed on Amaranthus species.
