= Giaura tetragramma =

Scientific classification
- Kingdom: Animalia
- Phylum: Arthropoda
- Class: Insecta
- Order: Lepidoptera
- Superfamily: Noctuoidea
- Family: Nolidae
- Genus: Giaura
- Species: G. tetragramma

Binomial name
- Giaura tetragramma (Hampson, 1905)

Synonyms
- Barasa tetragramma Hampson, 1905; Giaura obalauae Bethune-Baker, 1927

Species of moth

Giaura tetragramma is a moth in the family Nolidae. It was described by George Hampson in 1905. It is found in Fiji and on Samoa (Upolu). The wingspan is about 20 mm. The forewings are pale ashen grey, with a darker brown base and with a narrow darker external line. This is followed by a broad pale area, which is widest in the inner marginal area. Here, a very broad, slightly darker postmedian area reaches all across the wing. This area is bounded externally by a white line. There is a dark subterminal line. The hindwings are pale grey, with much very fine brownish irroration (sprinkling).
