= Nymphicula cyanolitha =

Scientific classification
- Kingdom: Animalia
- Phylum: Arthropoda
- Class: Insecta
- Order: Lepidoptera
- Family: Crambidae
- Genus: Nymphicula
- Species: N. cyanolitha

Binomial name
- Nymphicula cyanolitha (Meyrick, 1886)

Synonyms
- Anydraula cyanolitha Meyrick, 1886; Cataclysta cyanolitha

Species of moth

Nymphicula cyanolitha is a species of moth in the family Crambidae. It was described by Edward Meyrick in 1886. It is found in Fiji.

The wingspan is 13–15 mm.
