= Teleta =

Scientific classification
- Kingdom: Animalia
- Phylum: Arthropoda
- Class: Insecta
- Order: Lepidoptera
- Family: Tortricidae
- Tribe: Olethreutini
- Genus: Teleta; Diakonoff, 1966
- Species: T. talaris

Binomial name
- Teleta talaris (Durrant, 1915)

Synonyms
- Olethreutes talaris Durrant, 1915; Argyroploce xanthogastra Meyrick, 1921

Monotypic genus of tortrix moths

Teleta is a genus of moths belonging to the subfamily Olethreutinae of the family Tortricidae. It consists of only one species, Teleta talaris, which is found in Thailand, New Guinea and Java.

The wingspan is 17–19 mm. Adults have a purplish-lilac ground colour.

== See also ==
- List of Tortricidae genera
