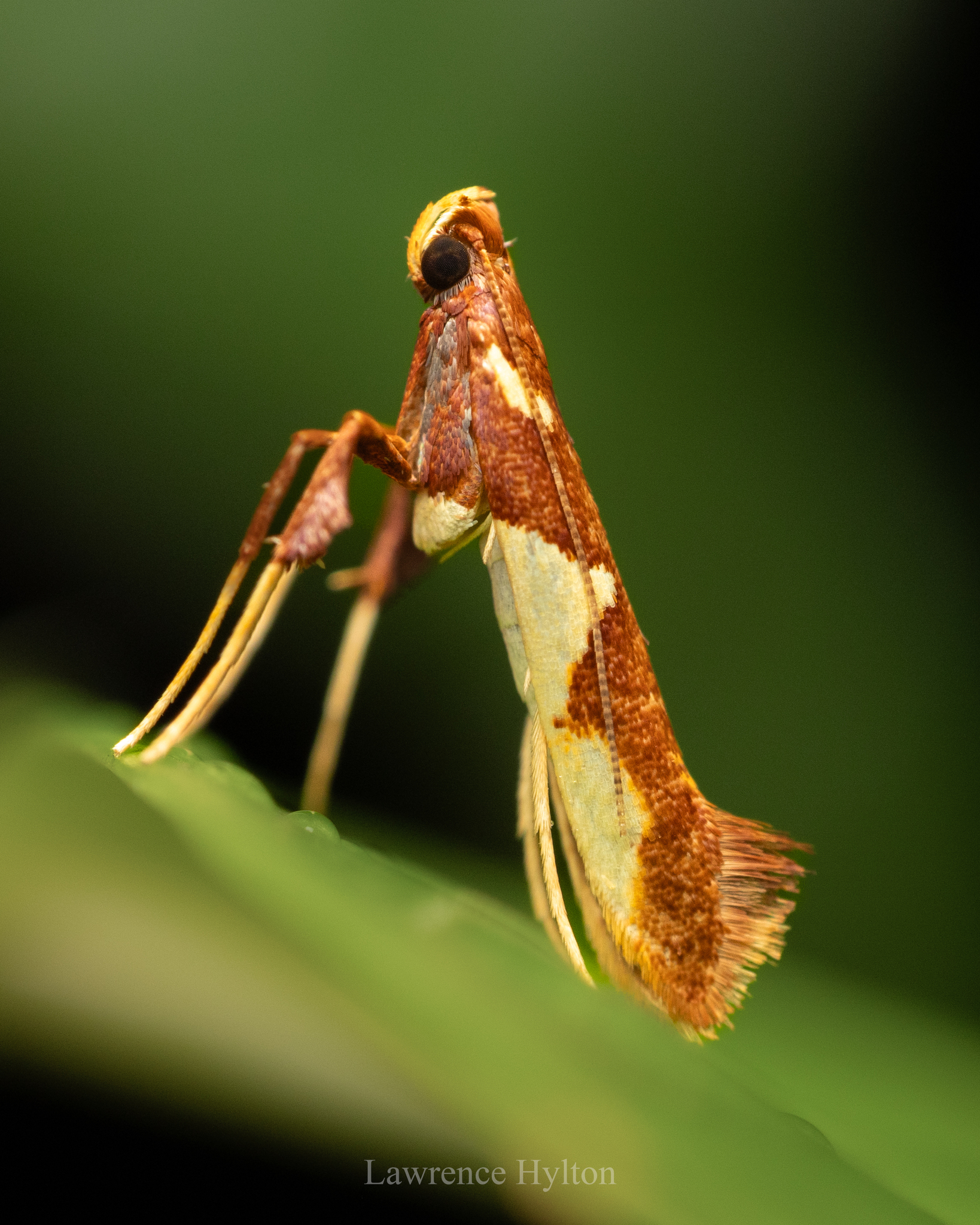

Scientific classification
- Domain: Eukaryota
- Kingdom: Animalia
- Phylum: Arthropoda
- Class: Insecta
- Order: Lepidoptera
- Family: Gracillariidae
- Genus: Caloptilia
- Species: C. xanthopharella

Binomial name
- Caloptilia xanthopharella (Meyrick, 1880)

Synonyms
- Gracilaria xanthopharella Meyrick, 1880

= Caloptilia xanthopharella =

Species of moth

Caloptilia xanthopharella is a moth of the family Gracillariidae. It is known from Australia (Queensland and New South Wales), Fiji, the Solomon Islands, and Vanuatu.

The larvae feed on Glochidion species, including Glochidion ferdinandi.
