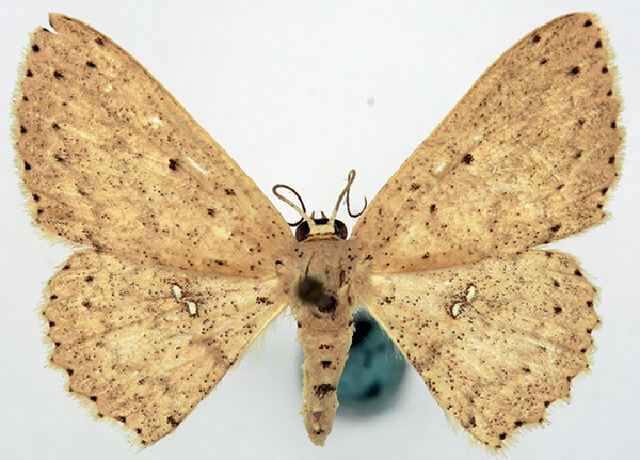
- Pseuderythrolophus bipunctatus

Scientific classification
- Kingdom: Animalia
- Phylum: Arthropoda
- Clade: Pancrustacea
- Class: Insecta
- Order: Lepidoptera
- Family: Geometridae
- Genus: Pseuderythrolophus; Prout, 1932
- Species: P. bipunctatus

Binomial name
- Pseuderythrolophus bipunctatus Warren, 1899

Synonyms
- Pseuderythrolophus geminipuncta Prout, 1934

= Pseuderythrolophus =

Genus of moths

Pseuderythrolophus is a monotypic moth genus in the family Geometridae described by Prout in 1932. Its only species, Pseuderythrolophus bipunctatus, was described by Warren in 1899. It was found in what was then British New Guinea. It has one subspecies, Pseuderythrolophus bipunctatus idmon, described by Prout in 1930, which is found in Fiji.
