= Etanna basalis =

Scientific classification
- Kingdom: Animalia
- Phylum: Arthropoda
- Class: Insecta
- Order: Lepidoptera
- Superfamily: Noctuoidea
- Family: Nolidae
- Genus: Etanna
- Species: E. basalis

Binomial name
- Etanna basalis Walker, 1862

Synonyms
- Andrapha basalis Walker, 1866; Dendrothripa atrifasciata Hampson, 1896; Dendrothripa mackwoodi Hampson, 1902

Species of moth

Etanna basalis is a moth of the family Nolidae first described by Francis Walker in 1862. It is found in Borneo, Sri Lanka, Myanmar, Thailand, New Guinea, Australia, Vanuatu and Fiji.

== Description ==
Its forewings have variable shades of pale gray and the hindwings are whitish. Its larval food plants are species of the genus Mangifera.
