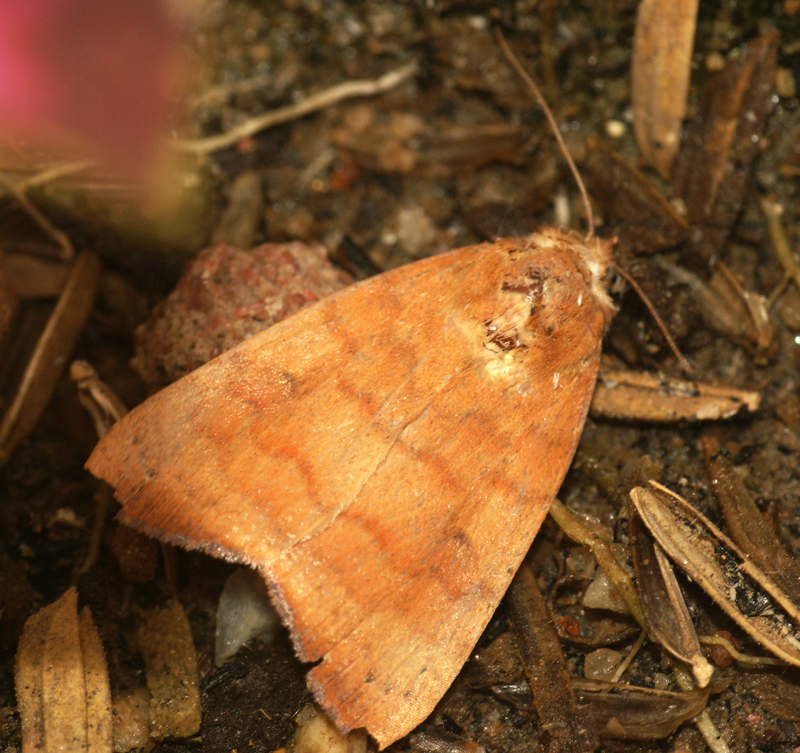

Scientific classification
- Kingdom: Animalia
- Phylum: Arthropoda
- Clade: Pancrustacea
- Class: Insecta
- Order: Lepidoptera
- Superfamily: Noctuoidea
- Family: Nolidae
- Genus: Maurilia
- Species: M. iconica

Binomial name
- Maurilia iconica (Walker, 1857)

Synonyms
- Anomis iconica Walker, 1857 [1858]; Briarda cervina Walker, 1866; Anomis candida instabilis Butler, 1889; Maurilia bifascia Gaede, 1915; Maurilia iconica ab. iconicoides Strand, 1915; Maurilia tunicata Swinhoe, 1918; Maurilia undaira Swinhoe, 1918; Maurilia fortis Swinhoe, 1918; Maurilia dalama Swinhoe, 1918; Maurilia gilva Swinhoe, 1919; Acontia elima Swinhoe, 1919; Maurilia iconicoides Gaede, 1938; Maurilia subiconica Kobes, 1997

= Maurilia iconica =

Species of moth

Maurilia iconica is a moth of the family Nolidae first described by Francis Walker in 1857. It is found in Indo-Australian tropics of Sri Lanka, Australia to the islands of Samoa, Rarotonga and New Caledonia.

== Description ==
Forewings gray to reddish in variable patterns. Some specimen possess a crescent shaped reniform stigma. Dots of posterior half of the postmedial row is irregular. Caterpillar dark brown with some pale brown marbles. All subdorsal, dorsolateral, lateral and spiracular lines are whitish and broken. Setae blackish. Inter segments are greenish or orange tinged. Pupation occur in a whitish silken cocoon. Cocoon semi ovoid, dirty fuscous in color and boat shaped.

Larval host plants include Vatica, Terminalia, Shorea, Anogeissus, Tectona and Saccharum species.
