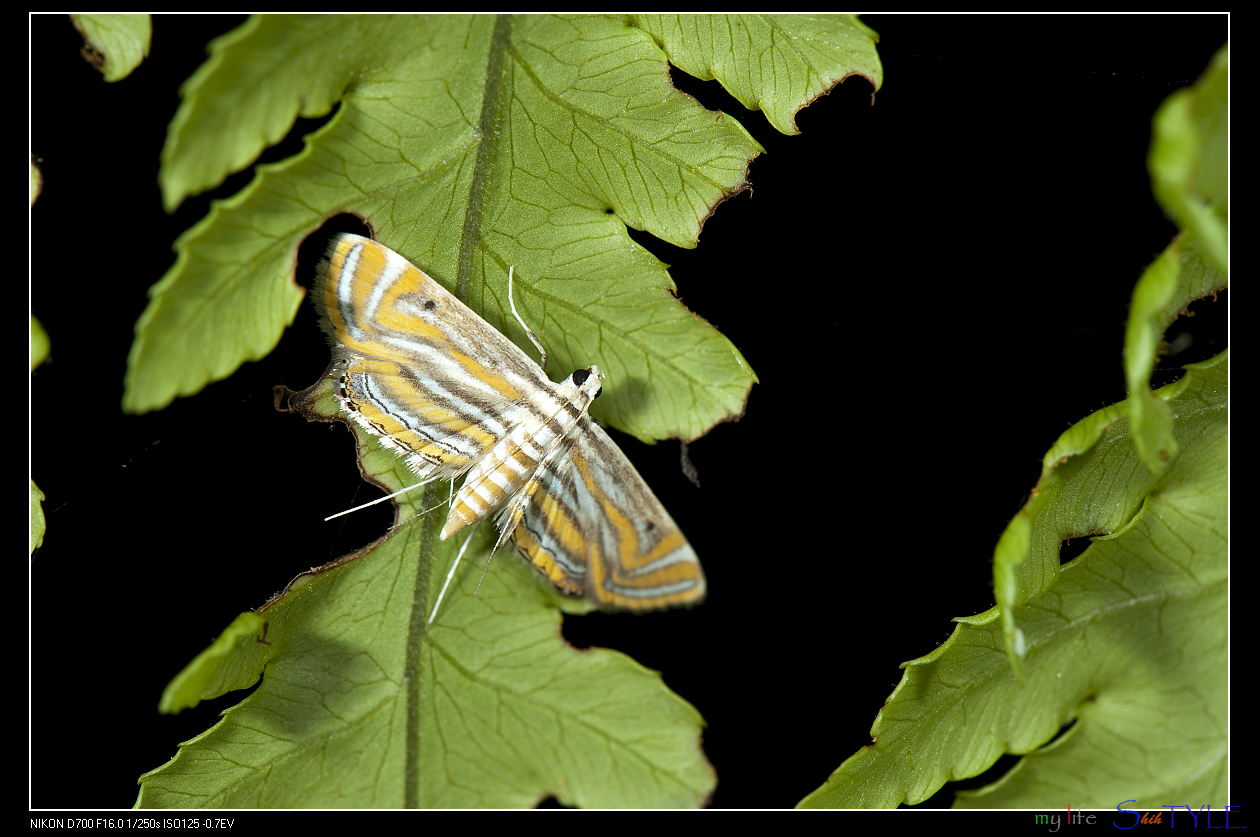

Scientific classification
- Kingdom: Animalia
- Phylum: Arthropoda
- Clade: Pancrustacea
- Class: Insecta
- Order: Lepidoptera
- Family: Crambidae
- Genus: Parapoynx
- Species: P. villidalis

Binomial name
- Parapoynx villidalis (Walker, 1859)

Synonyms
- Oligostigma villidalis Walker, 1859; Hydrocampa sacadasalis Walker, 1859; Oligostigma unilinealis Snellen, 1876

= Parapoynx villidalis =

Species of moth

Parapoynx villidalis is a moth in the family Crambidae. It was described by Francis Walker in 1859. It is found in Australia (Queensland, New South Wales), Indonesia (Java, Borneo), China (Hong Kong), Taiwan, Malaysia and Thailand, as well as on Fiji.

The wingspan is about 20 mm. The wings have white and brown-edged yellow stripes, with a dark spot near the costa of the forewings.
