= Sauris elaica =

Scientific classification
- Kingdom: Animalia
- Phylum: Arthropoda
- Class: Insecta
- Order: Lepidoptera
- Family: Geometridae
- Genus: Sauris
- Species: S. elaica

Binomial name
- Sauris elaica (Meyrick, 1886)

Synonyms
- Remodes elaica Meyrick 1886

Species of moth

Sauris elaica is a moth of the family Geometridae. It was described by Edward Meyrick in 1886. It is found on Fiji.
