= Scopula homodoxa =

Scientific classification
- Kingdom: Animalia
- Phylum: Arthropoda
- Class: Insecta
- Order: Lepidoptera
- Family: Geometridae
- Genus: Scopula
- Species: S. homodoxa

Binomial name
- Scopula homodoxa (Meyrick, 1886)

Synonyms
- Acidalia homodoxa Meyrick, 1886

Species of geometer moth in subfamily Sterrhinae

Scopula homodoxa is a moth of the family Geometridae. It is found in Tonga and Fiji.
