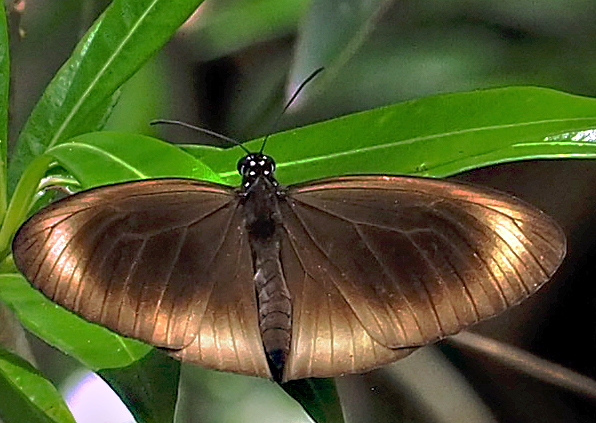

Scientific classification
- Kingdom: Animalia
- Phylum: Arthropoda
- Clade: Pancrustacea
- Class: Insecta
- Order: Lepidoptera
- Family: Nymphalidae
- Genus: Euploea
- Species: E. boisduvali

Binomial name
- Euploea boisduvali H. Lucas, 1852

Synonyms
- Euploea paykullei Butler, 1876; Deragena childreni Moore, 1883; Euploea (Chirosa) era de Nicéville, 1902; lystra Fruhstorfer, 1910; Euploea fraudulenta rendovana Fruhstorfer, 1913; melana Strand, 1914; simmondsi Poulton, 1924; Euploea herrichii C. Felder & R. Felder, [1865]; Vadebra mangoensis Butler, 1884; Danais eleutho Godart, [1824]; Danaide eleutho Quoy & Gaimard, 1824; Euploea proserpina Butler, 1866; Euploea brenchleyi Butler, 1870; Euploea torvina Butler, [1876]; Euploea fraudulenta Butler, 1882; Euploea bigamica Strand, 1914; Euploea pyrgion Godman & Salvin, 1888

= Euploea boisduvali =

Species of butterfly

Euploea boisduvali is a butterfly in the family Nymphalidae. It was described by Hippolyte Lucas in 1852. It is found in the Australasian realm.

== Subspecies ==
- E. b. boisduvali (Fiji)
- E. b. brenchleyi Butler, 1870 (Bougainville, San Cristobal, Santa Ana, Ugi, Rennel)
- E. b. torvina Butler, [1876] (Tana, Aneityum)
- E. b. torvina Butler, [1876] (Tana, Aneityum)
- E. b. torvina Butler, [1876] (Tana, Aneityum)
- E. b. fraudulenta Butler, 1882 (Woodlark, Solomons)
- E. b. pyrgion Godman & Salvin, 1888 (Malaita, Guadalcanal, Florida Island)
- E. b. albomarginata Carpenter, 1942 (San Cristobal, Santa Ana)
- E. b. rileyi Poulton, 1924 (New Caledonia, Loyalty Islands)
- E. b. bakeri Poulton, 1926 (New Hebrides, Banks Island)
- E. b. addenda Howarth, 1962 (Solomons: Bellona Island)

== Etymology ==
The name honours Jean Baptiste Boisduval.
