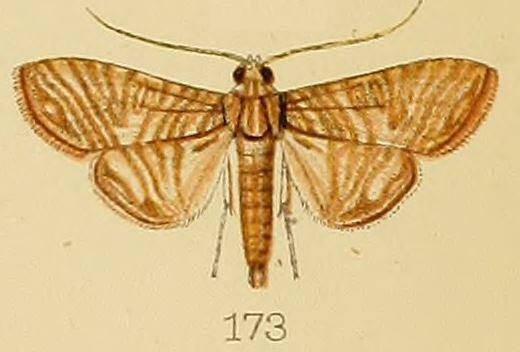

Scientific classification
- Kingdom: Animalia
- Phylum: Arthropoda
- Clade: Pancrustacea
- Class: Insecta
- Order: Lepidoptera
- Family: Crambidae
- Genus: Glyphodes
- Species: G. multilinealis

Binomial name
- Glyphodes multilinealis Kenrick, 1907

= Glyphodes multilinealis =

Species of moth

Glyphodes multilinealis, the fig-tiger-moth, is a species of moth of the family Crambidae described by George Hamilton Kenrick in 1907. It is found in Papua New Guinea, Fiji, Niue, the Cook Islands, the Society Islands, in Australia and Japan.

It has a wingspan of 31 mm (1.2 in).

== Biology ==
Its larvae have been reared in Fiji on Ficus prolixa.
