= Hylopercnas =

Scientific classification
- Kingdom: Animalia
- Phylum: Arthropoda
- Class: Insecta
- Order: Lepidoptera
- Family: Pyralidae
- Subfamily: Phycitinae
- Genus: Hylopercnas; Meyrick, 1934
- Species: H. eribolax

Binomial name
- Hylopercnas eribolax Meyrick, 1934

Genus of moths

Hylopercnas is a genus of snout moths. It was described by Edward Meyrick in 1934, and contains the species H. eribolax. It is found on Fiji.
