= Caloptilia callicirrha =

Scientific classification
- Kingdom: Animalia
- Phylum: Arthropoda
- Clade: Pancrustacea
- Class: Insecta
- Order: Lepidoptera
- Family: Gracillariidae
- Genus: Caloptilia
- Species: C. callicirrha

Binomial name
- Caloptilia callicirrha (Meyrick, 1924)

Species of moth

Caloptilia callicirrha is a moth of the family Gracillariidae. It is known from Fiji, Guadalcanal and Rennell Island.

The larvae feed on Cajanus cajan. They mine the leaves of their host plant.
