= Hypospila similis =

Scientific classification
- Domain: Eukaryota
- Kingdom: Animalia
- Phylum: Arthropoda
- Class: Insecta
- Order: Lepidoptera
- Superfamily: Noctuoidea
- Family: Erebidae
- Genus: Hypospila
- Species: H. similis

Binomial name
- Hypospila similis Tams, 1935

Species of moth

Hypospila similis is a species of moth in the family Erebidae. It is found on Samoa and Fiji.

== Subspecies ==
- Hypospila similis similis (Samoa)
- Hypospila similis fijiensis Robinson, 1965 (Fiji)
