= Macaretaera =

Scientific classification
- Kingdom: Animalia
- Phylum: Arthropoda
- Class: Insecta
- Order: Lepidoptera
- Family: Crambidae
- Subfamily: Spilomelinae
- Genus: Macaretaera; Meyrick, 1886
- Species: M. hesperis

Binomial name
- Macaretaera hesperis Meyrick, 1886

Synonyms
- Trichoptychodes Swinhoe, 1894; Trigonophylla Turner, 1937; Trichoptychodes delicata Swinhoe, 1894; Trigonophylla trichroma Turner, 1937

Genus of moths

Macaretaera is a monotypic moth genus of the family Crambidae described by Edward Meyrick in 1886. It contains only one species, Macaretaera hesperis, described by the same author in the same year, which is found in India, Vietnam, Australia (Queensland), Papua New Guinea and on Fiji.
