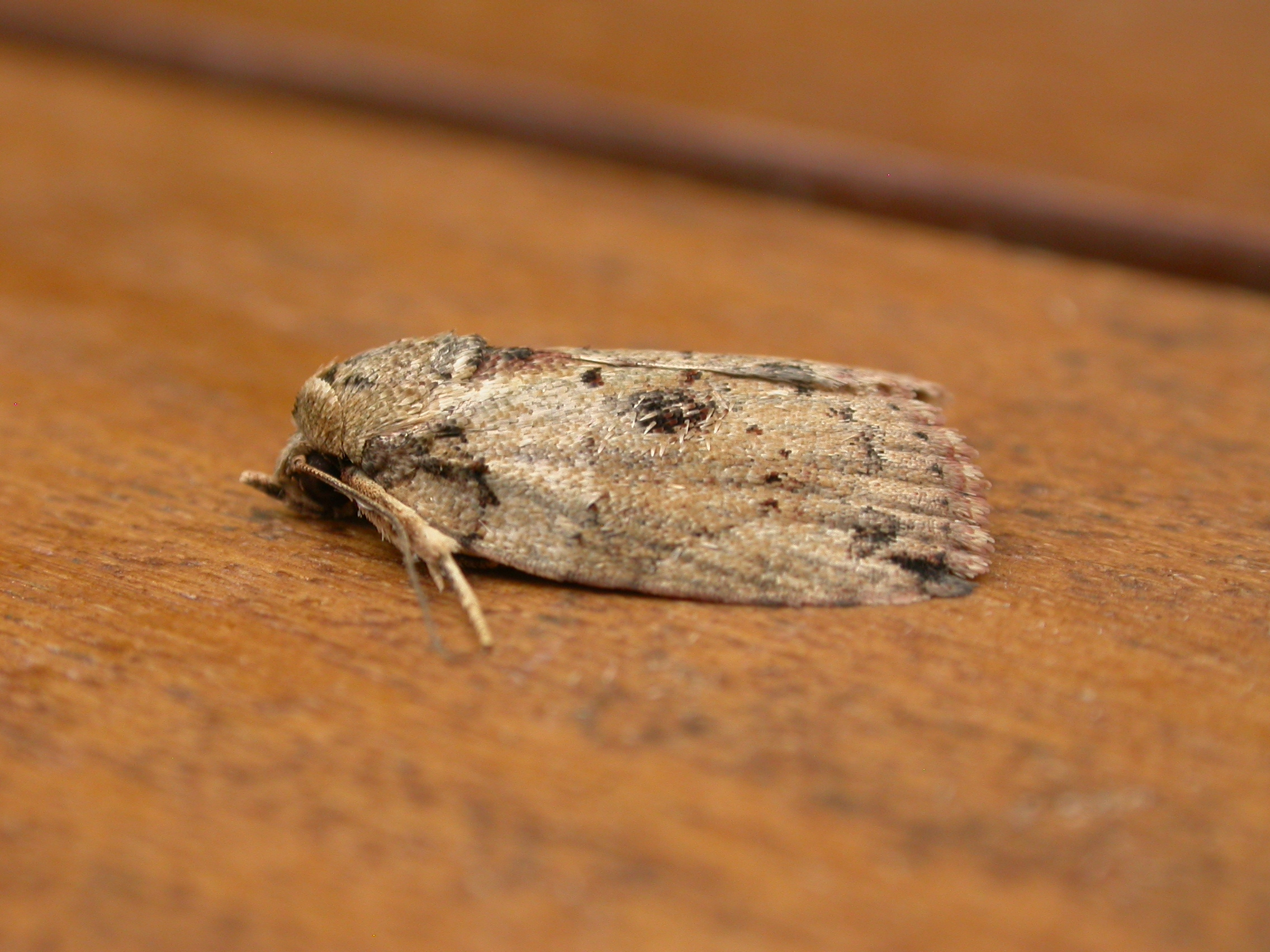

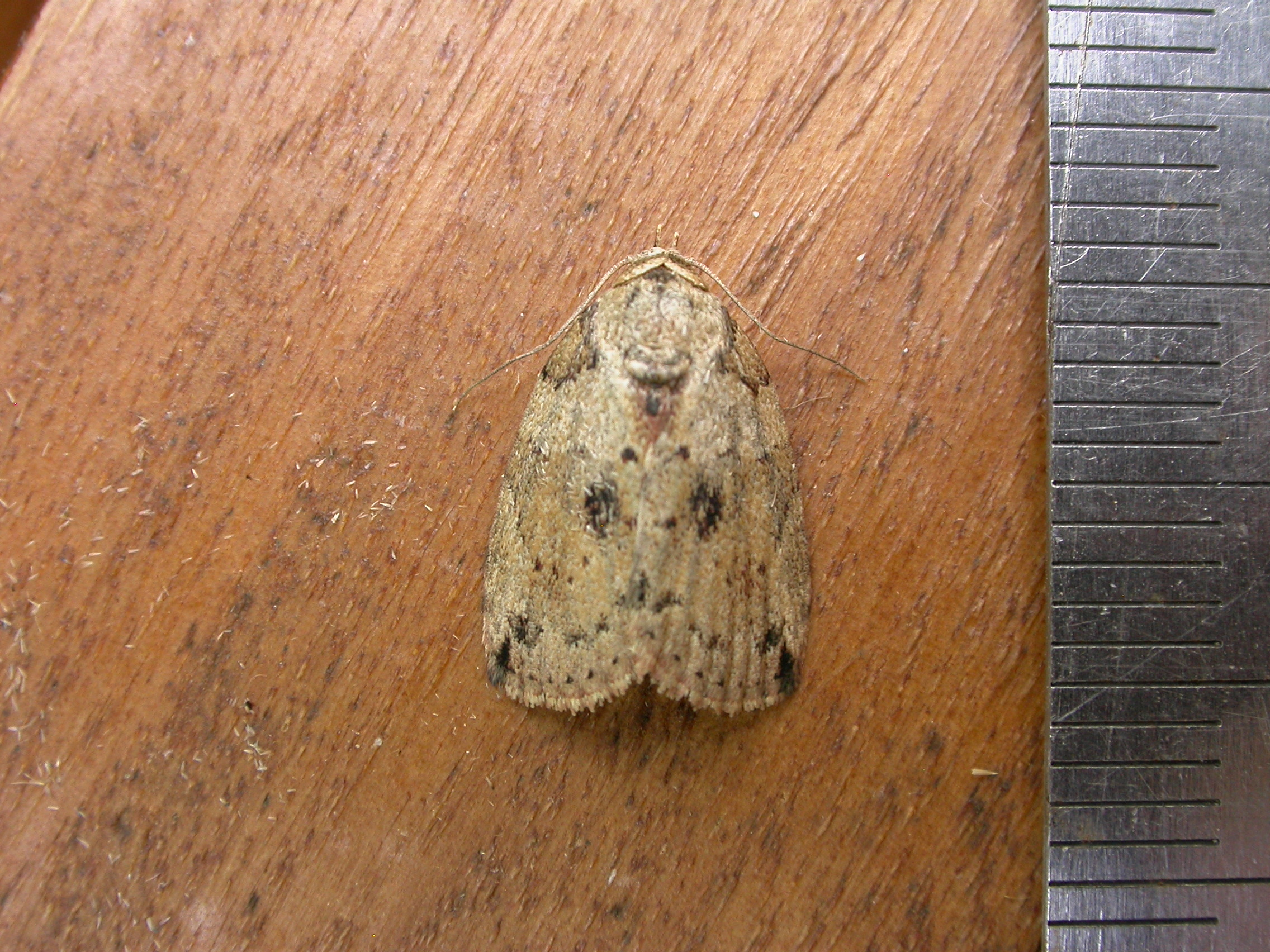

Scientific classification
- Kingdom: Animalia
- Phylum: Arthropoda
- Clade: Pancrustacea
- Class: Insecta
- Order: Lepidoptera
- Superfamily: Noctuoidea
- Family: Nolidae
- Genus: Etanna
- Species: E. breviuscula

Binomial name
- Etanna breviuscula (Walker, 1863)

Synonyms
- Cletthara valida Walker, 1863; Clettharra valida Walker, 1863; Etanna valida (Walker, 1863); Nanaguna breviuscula Walker, 1863; Nanagana tenebrata Strand, 1917; Nanaguna discalis Strand, 1917; Nanaguna discoidalis Strand, 1917; Nanaguna dorsofascia Strand, 1917; Nanaguna mediomaculata Strand, 1917; Nanaguna uniformis Strand, 1917; Nanaguna variegatana Strand, 1917; Clettharra floccifera Hampson, 1894; Symitha nigridisca Hampson, 1891; Bagistana xyloglypta Lucas, 1890; Bagistana rudis Walker, 1865

= Etanna breviuscula =

Species of moth

Etanna breviuscula, the pigeonpea pod borer, is a moth species of the family Nolidae. It is found from Sri Lanka and India east to Samoa. In Australia it is found in the Kimberleys in Western Australia, the northern part of the Northern Territory and from the Torres Strait Islands and Queensland to Sydney in New South Wales.

== Description ==
The wingspan is about 20–24 mm. Forewing with vein 10 stalked with veins 7,8 and 9. Hindwings with veins 3,4 stalked. Head, thorax and abdomen pale brown. Forewings pale red brown. There is an oblique black and streak runs from costa near base to above centre of inner margin. A waved antemedial pale line, and a postmedial line angled outwards beyond the cell can be seen. Inner area greyish from the base to the postmedial line. The apical area suffused with white and three black costal striae runs before the apex. Two black streaks above outer angle, which is suffused with black and white. Hindwings white, and slightly suffused with fuscous outer margin.

It is a minor pest, where the larvae feed on a wide range of plants, including Grevillea glauca, Desmodium species and the flowers of Mangifera indica.
