= H. leucocephalus =

H. leucocephalus may refer to:

- Bald eagle (Haliaeetus leucocephalus), species of bird found in North America
- Pied stilt (Himantopus leucocephalus), species of bird found in Asia and Oceania
- Hippotion leucocephalus, species of moth
- Black bulbul (Hypsipetes leucocephalus), species of bulbul birds
