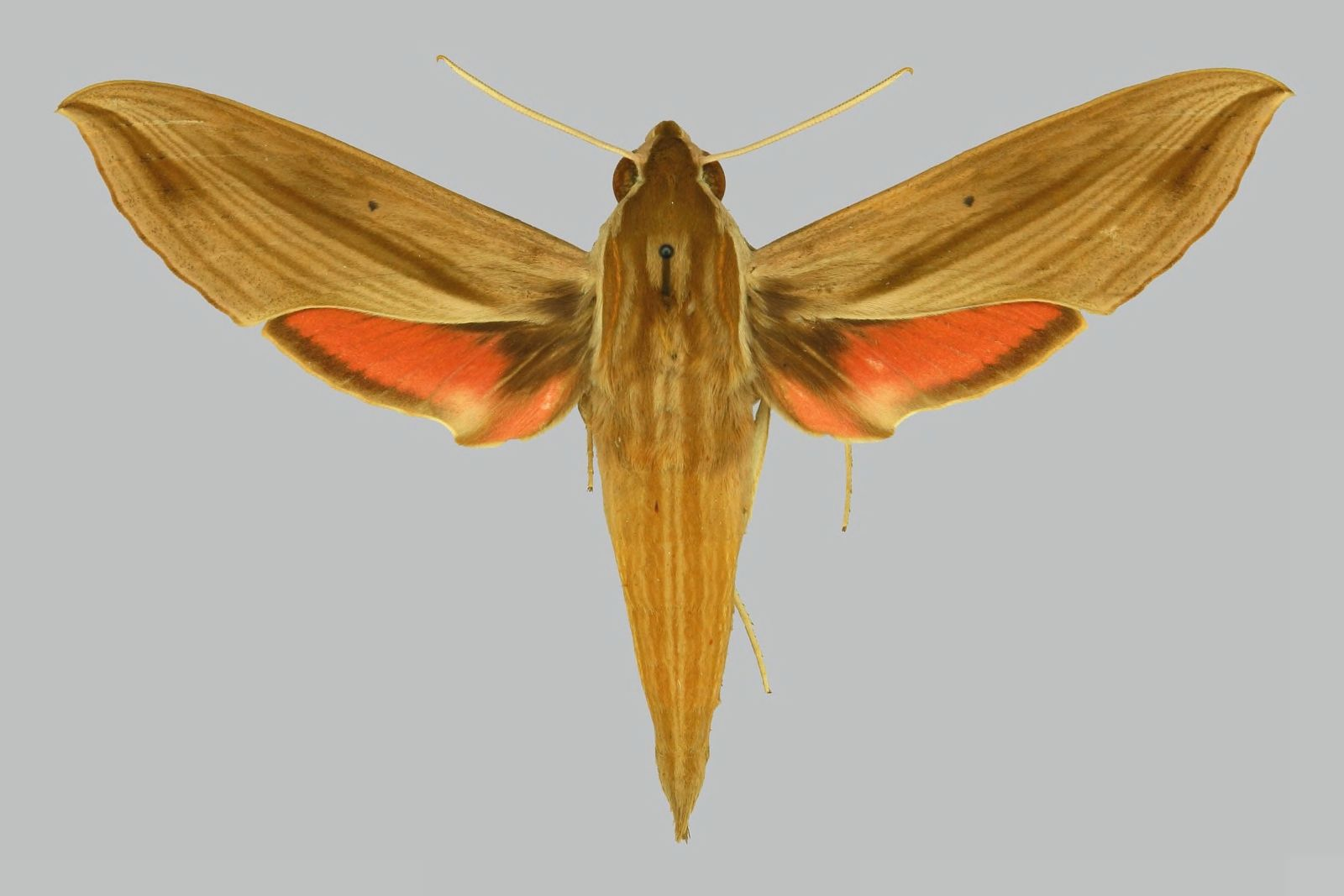

Scientific classification
- Kingdom: Animalia
- Phylum: Arthropoda
- Class: Insecta
- Order: Lepidoptera
- Family: Sphingidae
- Genus: Hippotion
- Species: H. gracilis

Binomial name
- Hippotion gracilis (Butler, 1875)

Synonyms
- Chaerocampa gracilis Butler, 1875; Hippotion eson comoroana Clark, 1929; Hippotion eson luridus Gehlen, 1944

= Hippotion gracilis =

Species of moth

Hippotion gracilis is a moth of the family Sphingidae. It is known from most of sub-Saharan Africa.

The wingspan is 64.6–71.1 mm for males and 66.9–71.1 mm for females. It is very similar to Hippotion eson, but in general smaller, paler and with a less contrasting forewing upperside pattern. The forewing upperside is also very similar to Hippotion eson, but the first and second postmedian lines are thinner and paler and not fused. On average, the discal spot is smaller.
