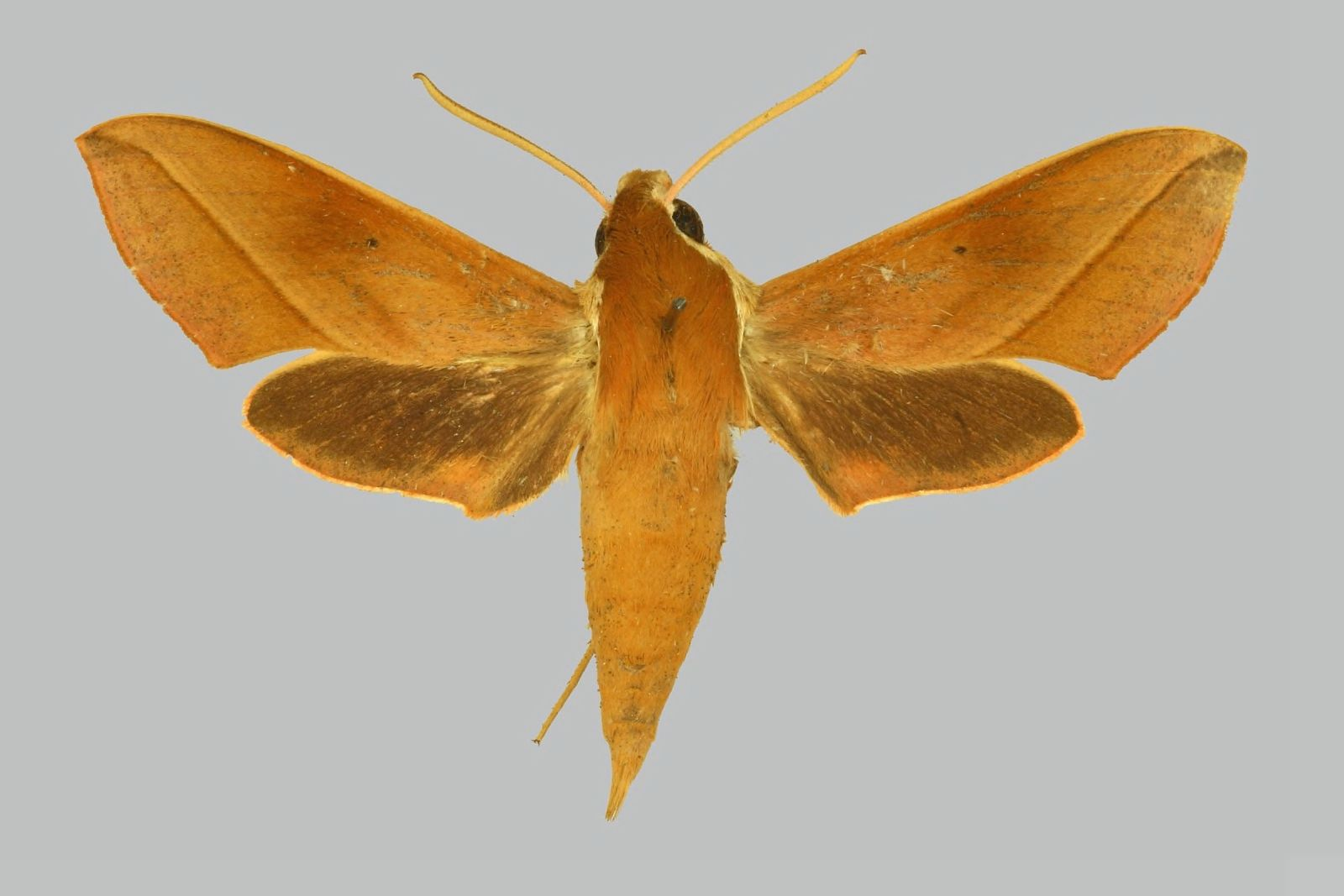
- Male

Scientific classification
- Kingdom: Animalia
- Phylum: Arthropoda
- Class: Insecta
- Order: Lepidoptera
- Family: Sphingidae
- Genus: Hippotion
- Species: H. batschii

Binomial name
- Hippotion batschii (Keferstein, 1870)

Synonyms
- Chaerocampa batschii Keferstein, 1870; Choerocampa humilis Butler, 1879

= Hippotion batschii =

Species of moth

Hippotion batschii is a moth of the family Sphingidae. It is known from Madagascar.

It is very similar to Hippotion saclavorum, but distinguishable by the darker reddish-brown colour of the upperside of the body and forewings. Only the fifth postmedian line is distinct and conspicuous on the forewing upperside.
