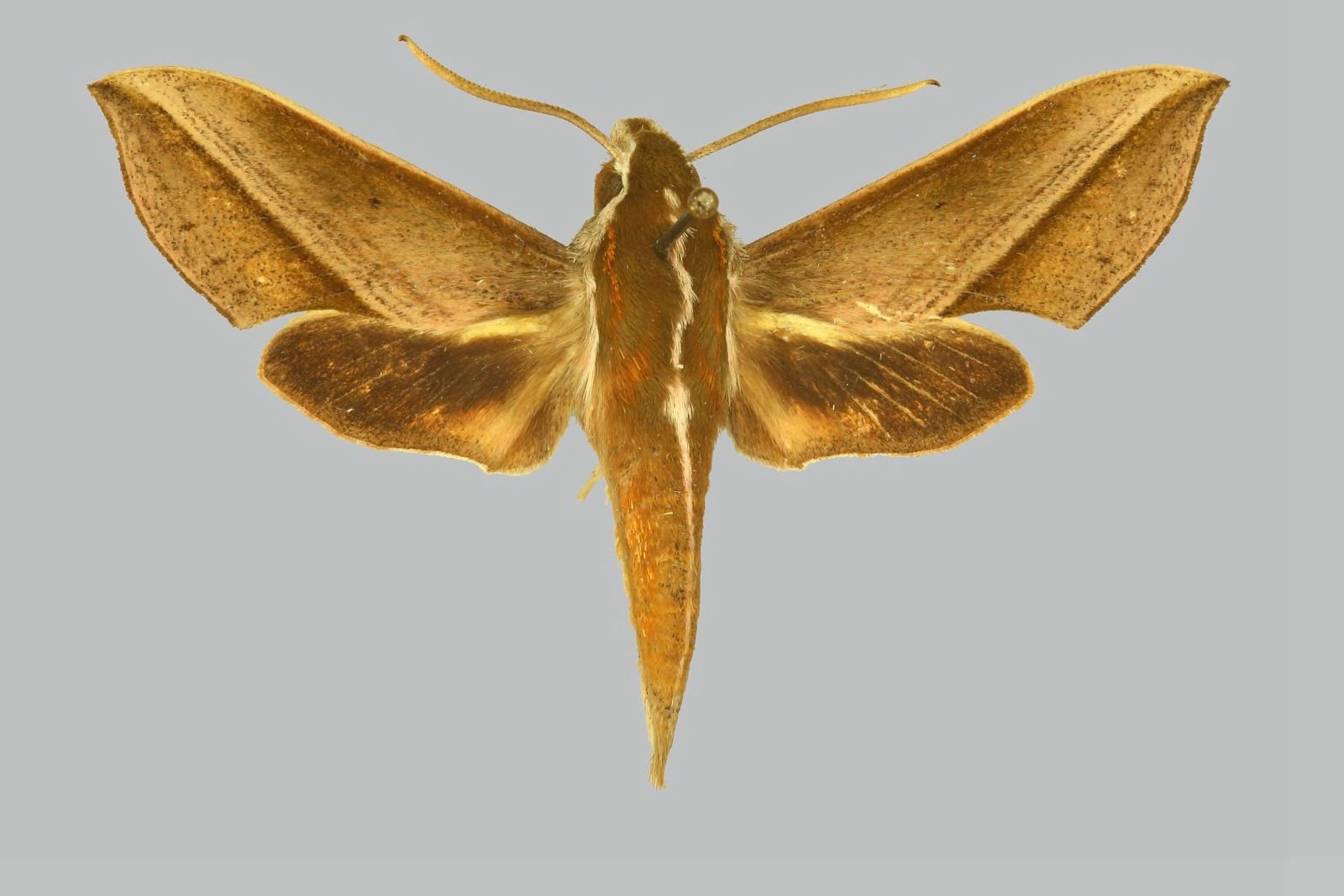

Scientific classification
- Kingdom: Animalia
- Phylum: Arthropoda
- Class: Insecta
- Order: Lepidoptera
- Family: Sphingidae
- Genus: Hippotion
- Species: H. griveaudi

Binomial name
- Hippotion griveaudi Carcasson, 1968

Synonyms
- Hippotion albolineata Griveaud, 1959 (preocc.)

= Hippotion griveaudi =

Species of moth

Hippotion griveaudi is a moth of the family Sphingidae. It is known from Madagascar.
