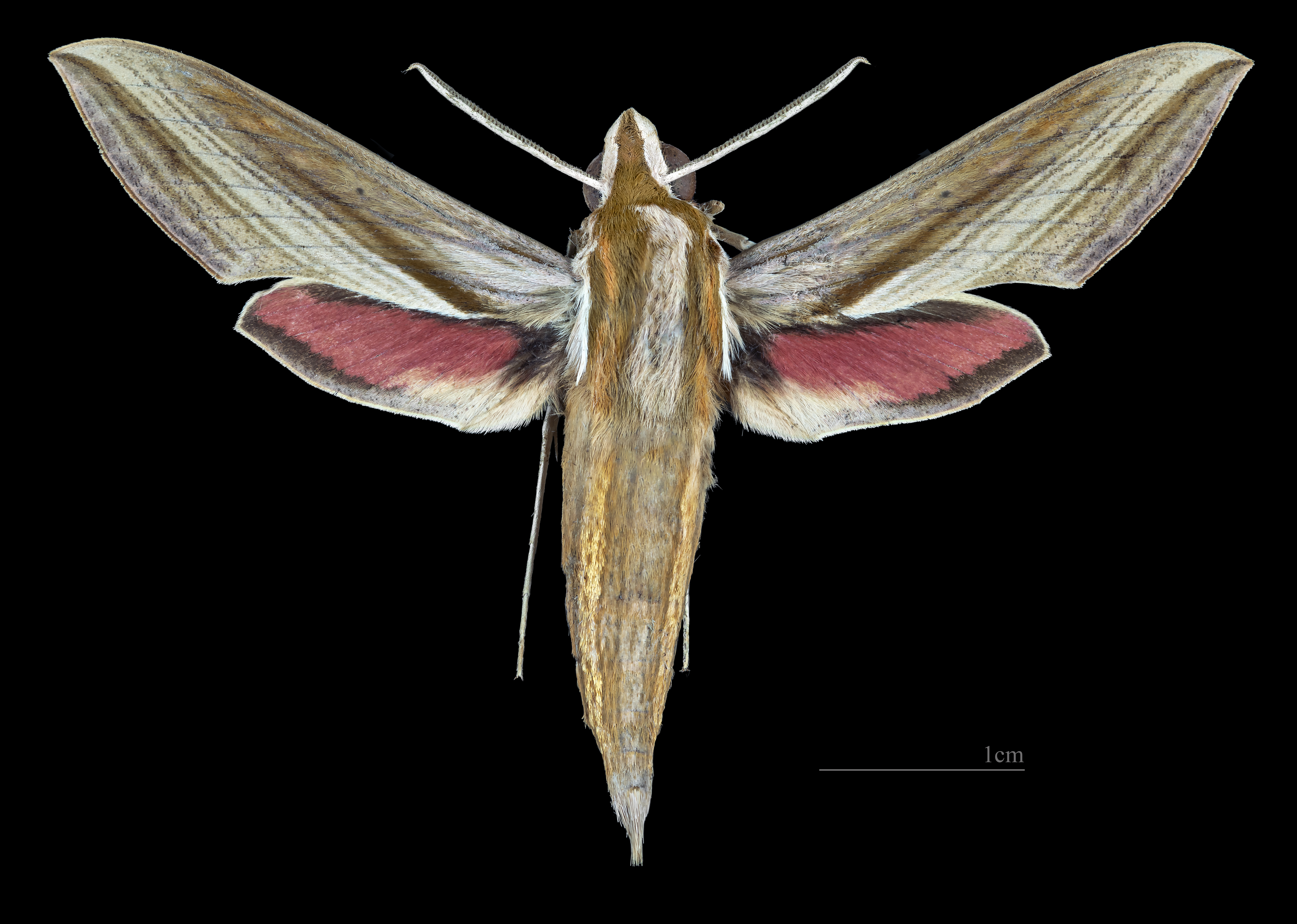
- Male dorsal
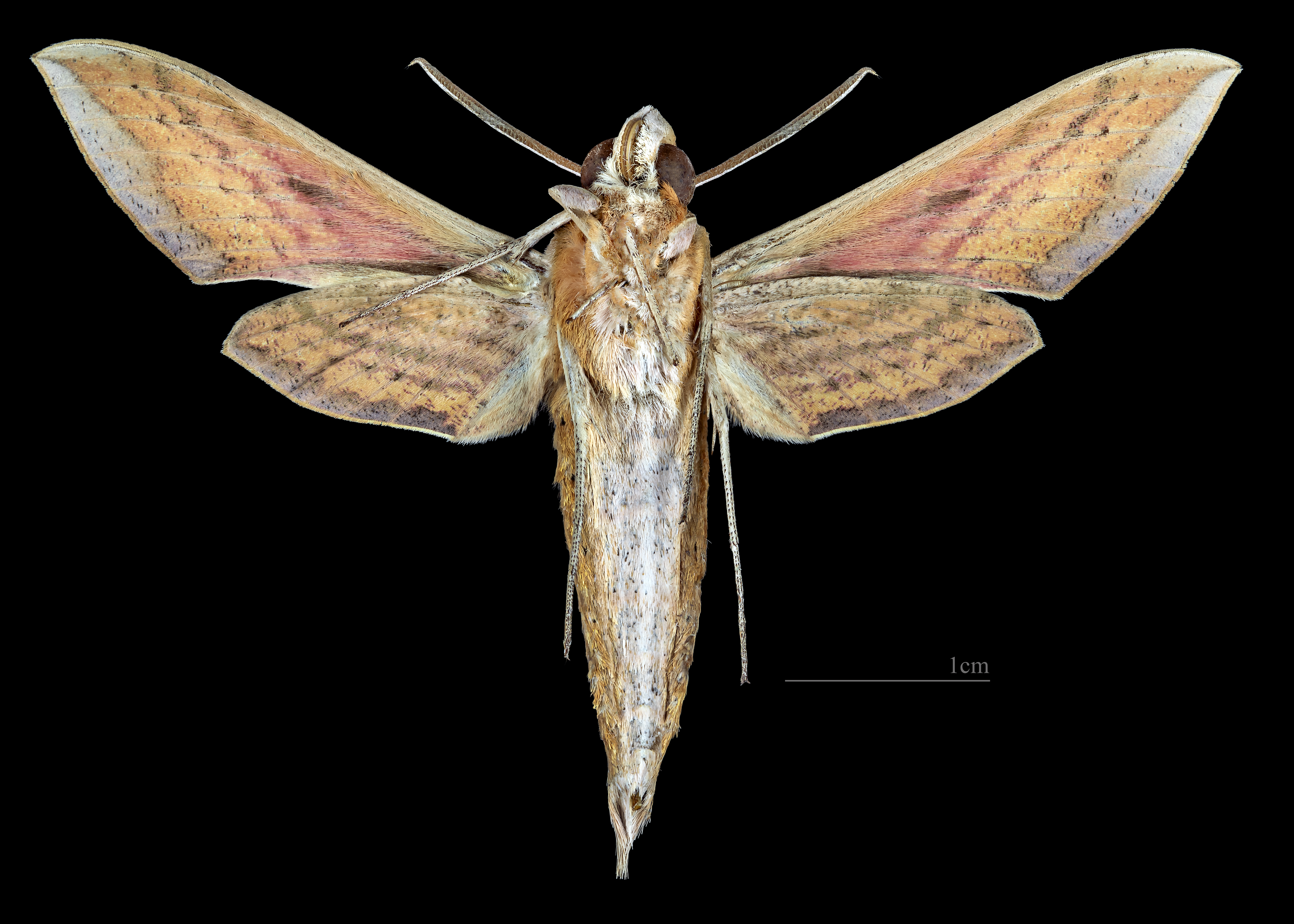
- Male ventral

Scientific classification
- Kingdom: Animalia
- Phylum: Arthropoda
- Class: Insecta
- Order: Lepidoptera
- Family: Sphingidae
- Genus: Hippotion
- Species: H. echeclus

Binomial name
- Hippotion echeclus (Boisduval, 1875)

Synonyms
- Choerocampa echeclus Boisduval, 1875; Chaerocampa elegans Butler, 1875

= Hippotion echeclus =

Species of moth

Hippotion echeclus, the black-based striated hawkmoth, is a moth of the family Sphingidae. *

== Distribution ==
It is known from southern and eastern India, Myanmar, Thailand, south-eastern China, southern Japan (Ryukyu Archipelago), Malaysia (Peninsular, Sarawak, Sabah), Indonesia (Sumatra, Java, Kalimantan, Lombok, Sumba) and the Philippines (Luzon, Bohol).

== Description ==
The wingspan is 64–84 mm.

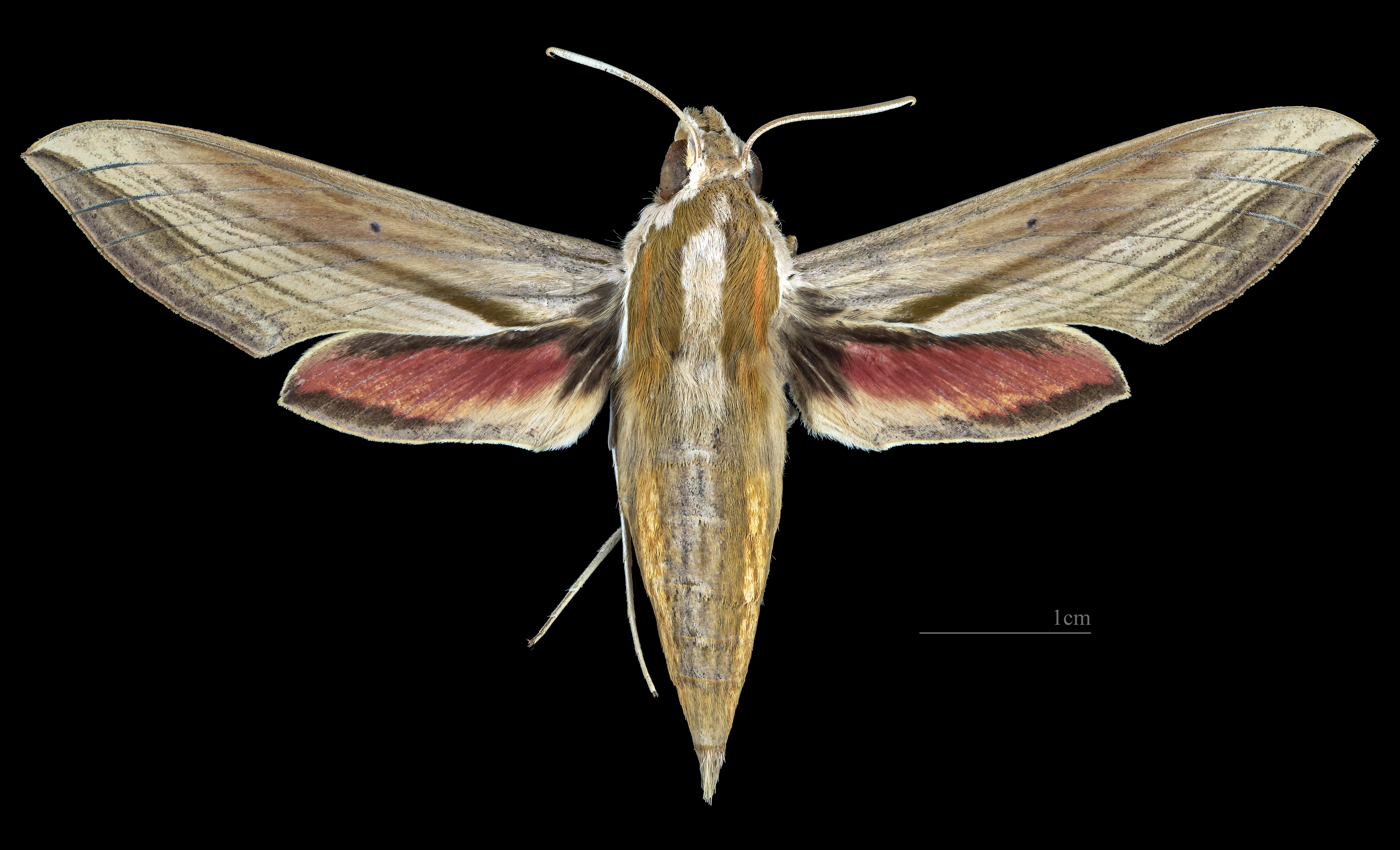
Female dorsal

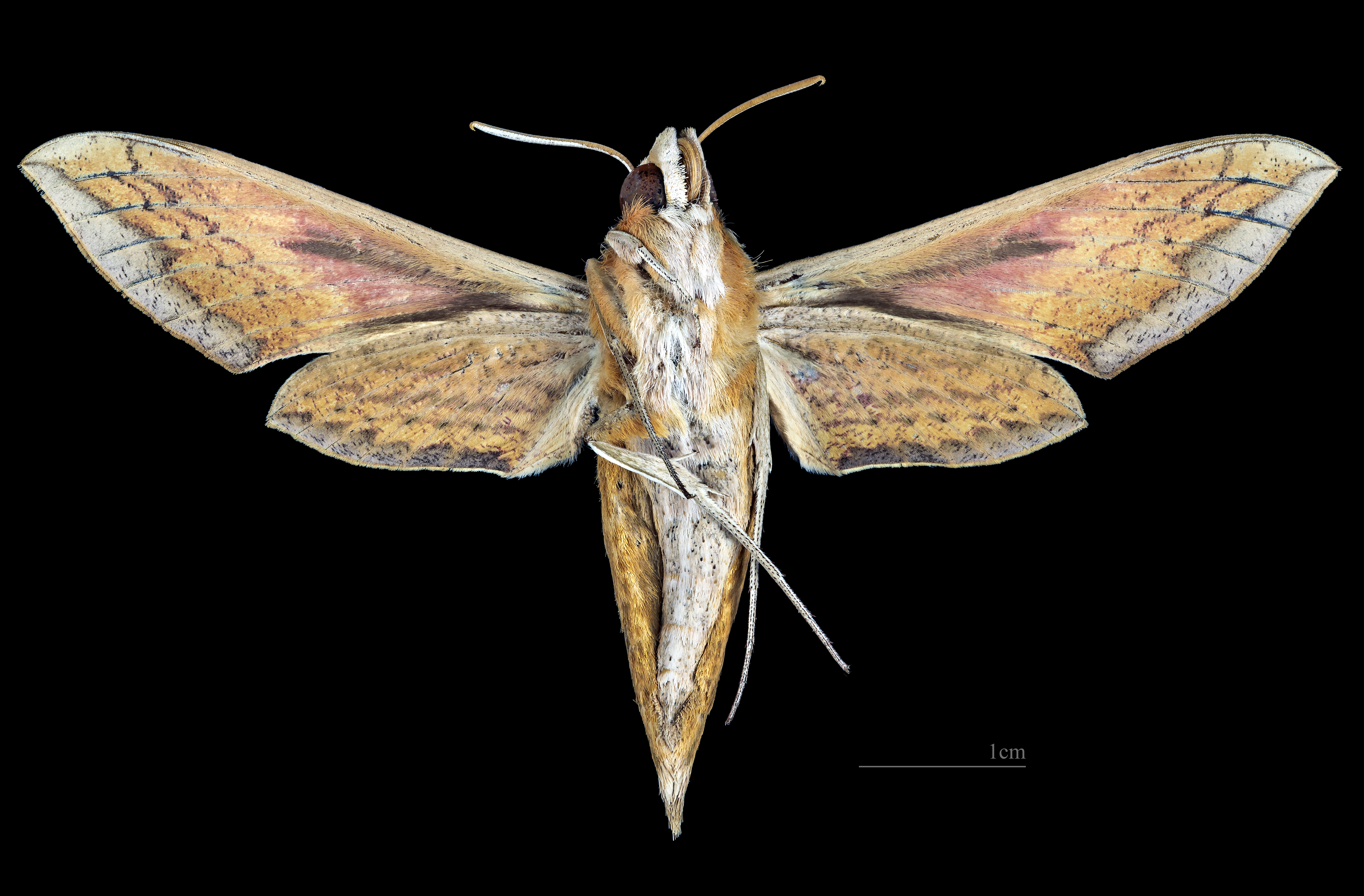
Female ventral

== Biology ==
Larvae have been recorded on Sesamum indicum and Monochoria hastaefolia in India and Eichhornia crassipes in Thailand.
