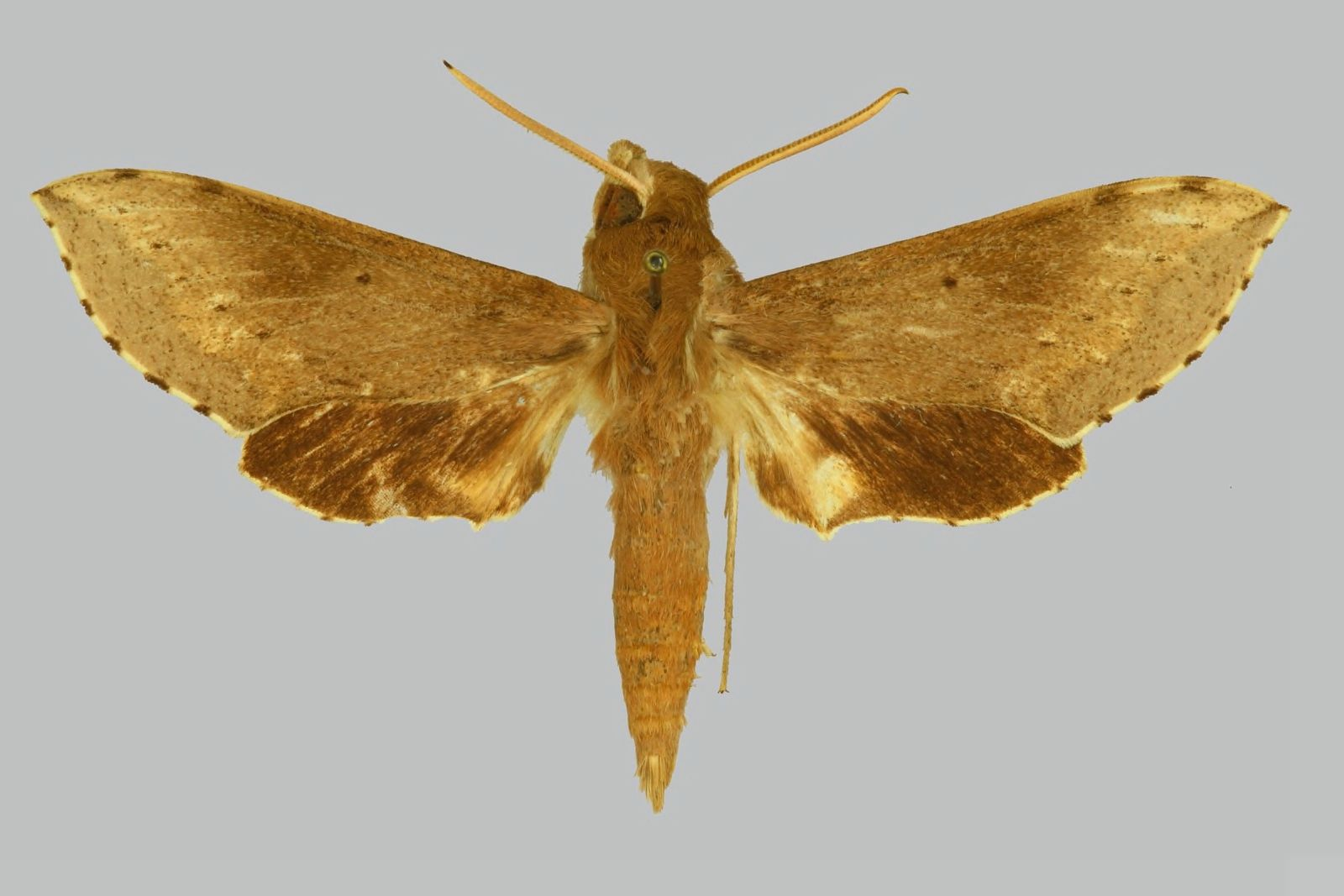
- Male

Scientific classification
- Kingdom: Animalia
- Phylum: Arthropoda
- Class: Insecta
- Order: Lepidoptera
- Family: Sphingidae
- Genus: Hippotion
- Species: H. butleri

Binomial name
- Hippotion butleri (Saalmüller, 1884)

Synonyms
- Panacra butleri Saalmüller, 1884

= Hippotion butleri =

Species of moth

Hippotion butleri is a moth of the family Sphingidae. It is known from Madagascar.
