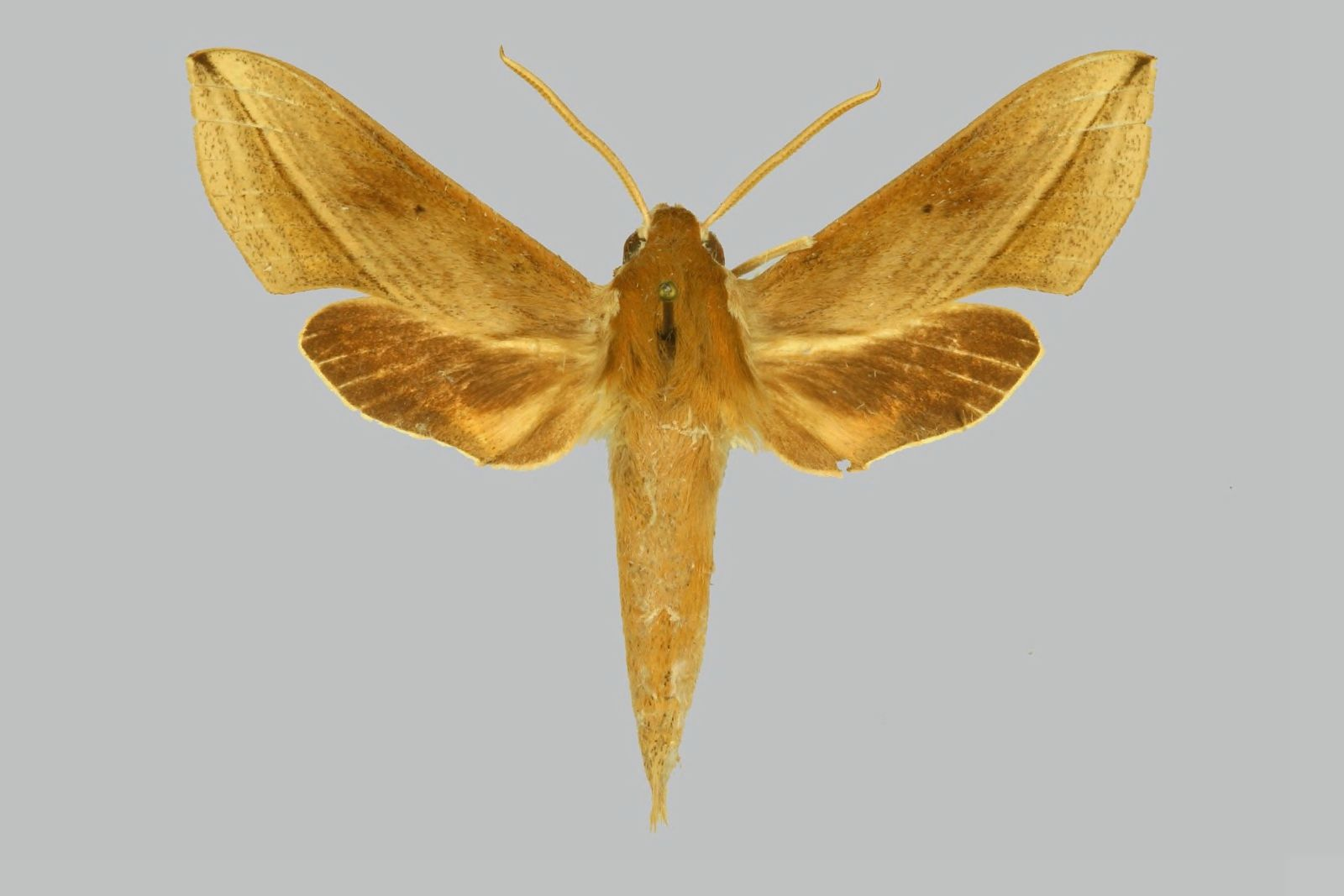

Scientific classification
- Kingdom: Animalia
- Phylum: Arthropoda
- Class: Insecta
- Order: Lepidoptera
- Family: Sphingidae
- Genus: Hippotion
- Species: H. saclavorum

Binomial name
- Hippotion saclavorum (Boisduval, 1833)

Synonyms
- Deilephila saclavorum Boisduval, 1833

= Hippotion saclavorum =

Species of moth

Hippotion saclavorum is a moth of the family Sphingidae. It is known from Madagascar, In the town of Ambinanindrano, 50 km west of Mahanoro.

The length of the forewings is about 23 mm. This is a small, brown species which is similar to Hippotion balsaminae but with shorter and more rounded forewings. The abdomen upperside has dorsal and subdorsal longitudinal lines which are only very weakly indicated. The forewing upperside has a full complement of postmedian lines, of which the fifth is the heaviest, the sixth the next heaviest and the first to fourth equally narrow and inconspicuous. The hindwing upperside is dark brown with the pale brown median band clearly visible only near the tornus.
