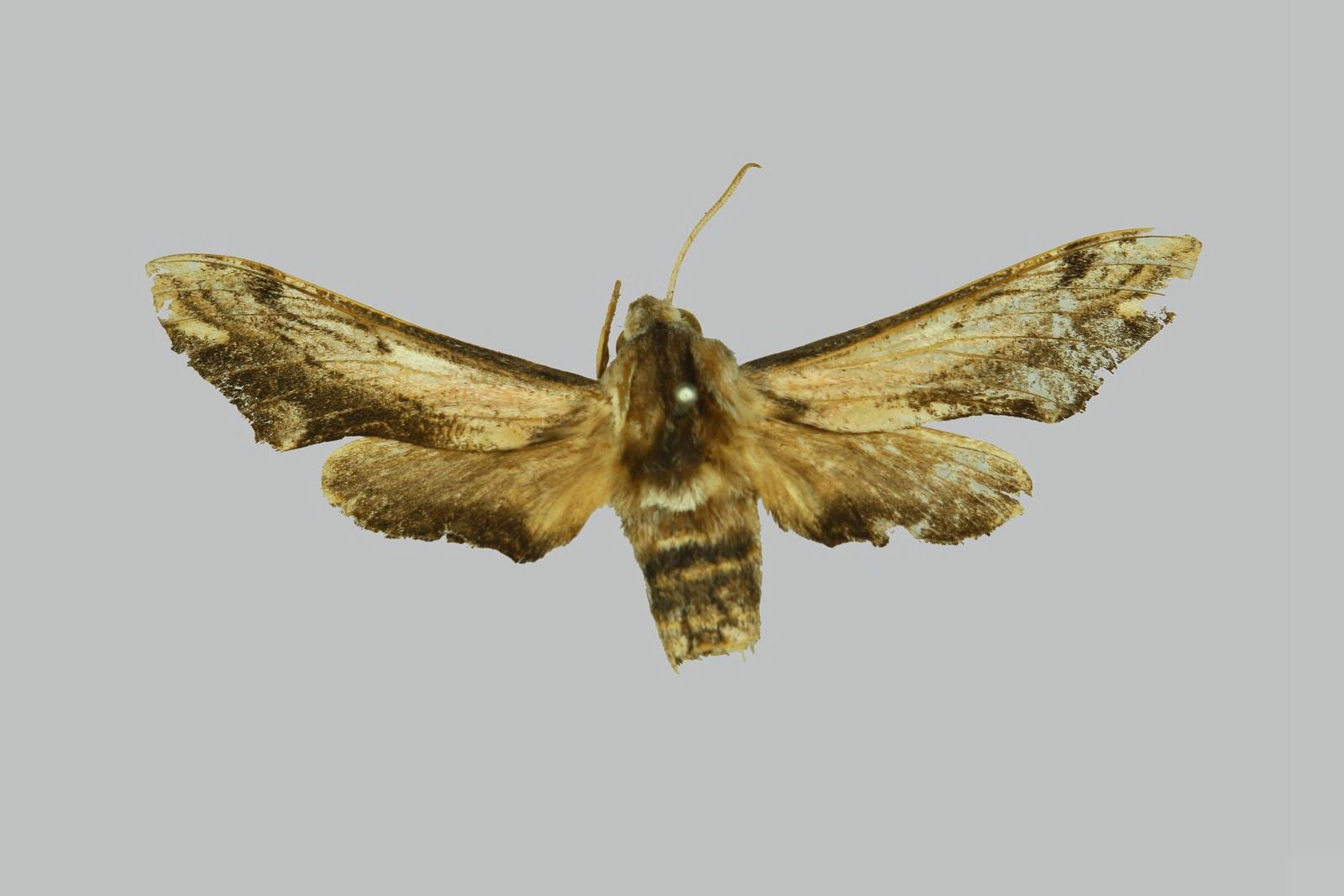

Scientific classification
- Kingdom: Animalia
- Phylum: Arthropoda
- Class: Insecta
- Order: Lepidoptera
- Family: Sphingidae
- Genus: Hippotion
- Species: H. adelinae

Binomial name
- Hippotion adelinae Schmit, 2005

= Hippotion adelinae =

Species of moth

Hippotion adelinae is a moth of the family Sphingidae. It is known from Zambia, Malawi and Mozambique.
