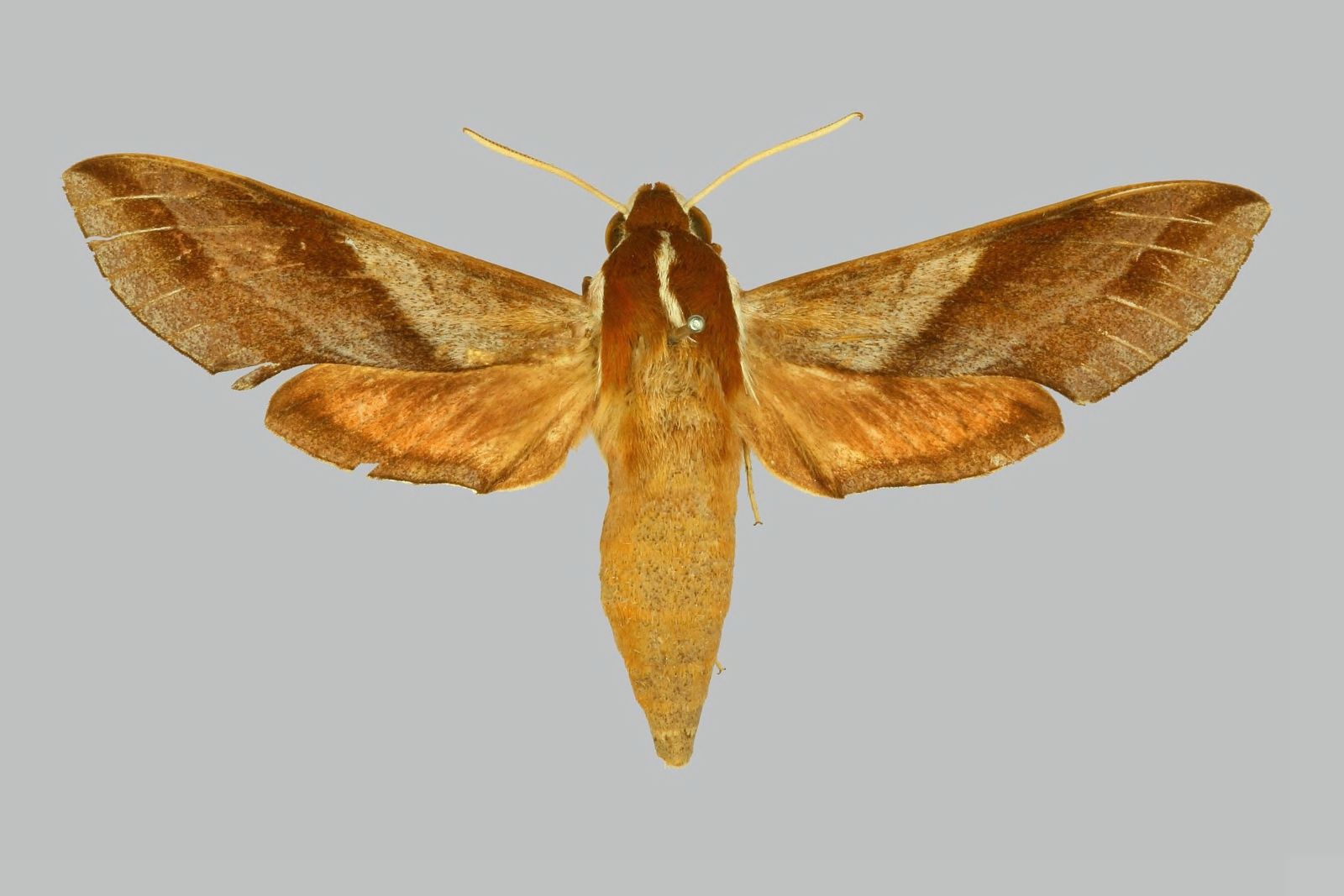

Scientific classification
- Kingdom: Animalia
- Phylum: Arthropoda
- Class: Insecta
- Order: Lepidoptera
- Family: Sphingidae
- Genus: Hippotion
- Species: H. joiceyi

Binomial name
- Hippotion joiceyi Clark, 1922

= Hippotion joiceyi =

Species of moth

Hippotion joiceyi is a moth of the family Sphingidae. It is found in Indonesia.

The length of the forewings is about 30 mm. It is very similar to Hippotion brennus form brennus but immediately distinguishable by the lack of paired subdorsal white spots on the abdomen. The frons and upperside of the labial palps is dark brown. The upperside of the abdomen is unicolorous orange-brown, contrasting strongly with the dark brown and pale grey thorax.
