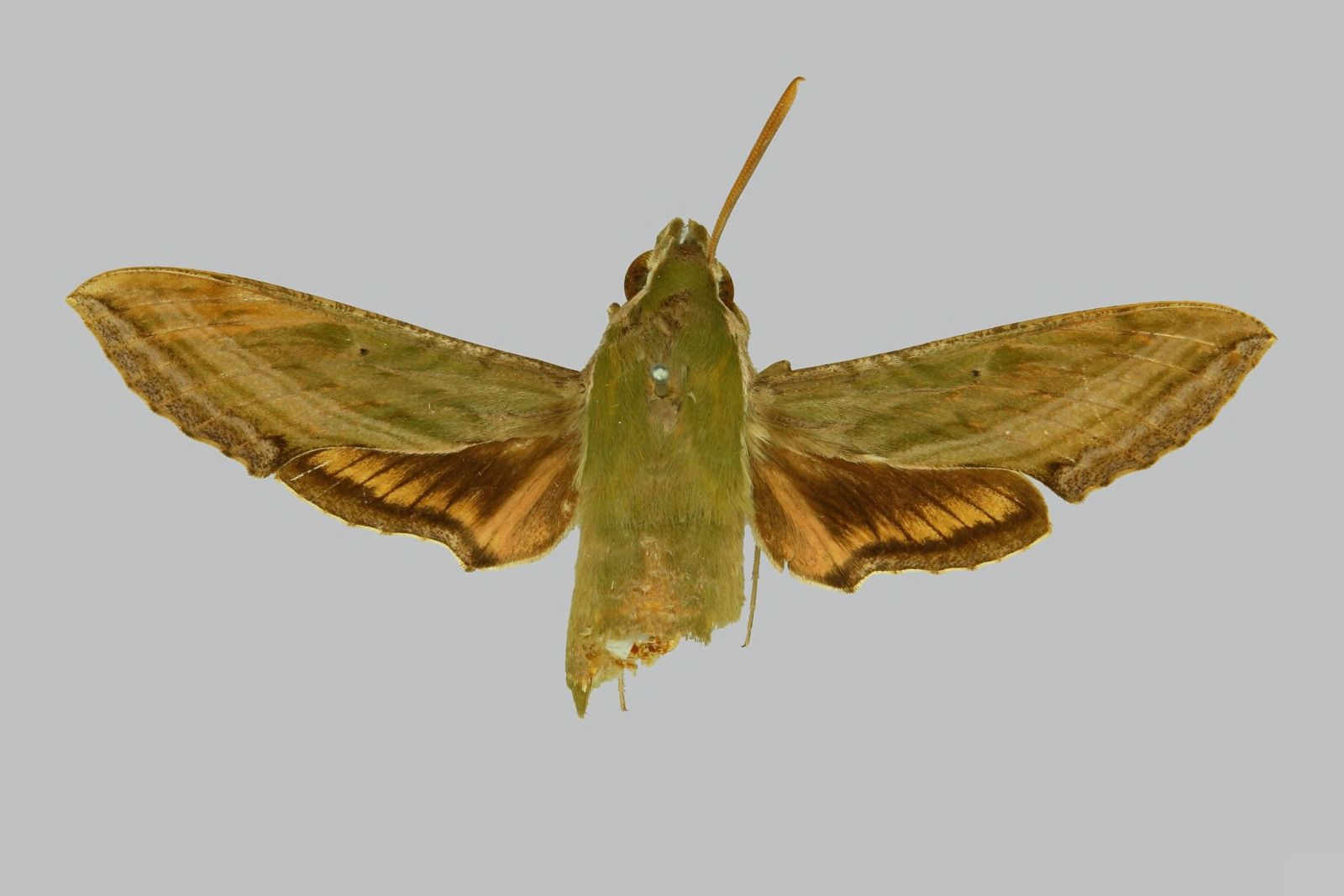
- Male

Scientific classification
- Kingdom: Animalia
- Phylum: Arthropoda
- Class: Insecta
- Order: Lepidoptera
- Family: Sphingidae
- Genus: Hippotion
- Species: H. chloris

Binomial name
- Hippotion chloris Rothschild & Jordan, 1907

= Hippotion chloris =

Species of moth

Hippotion chloris is a moth of the family Sphingidae. It is known from Kenya.
