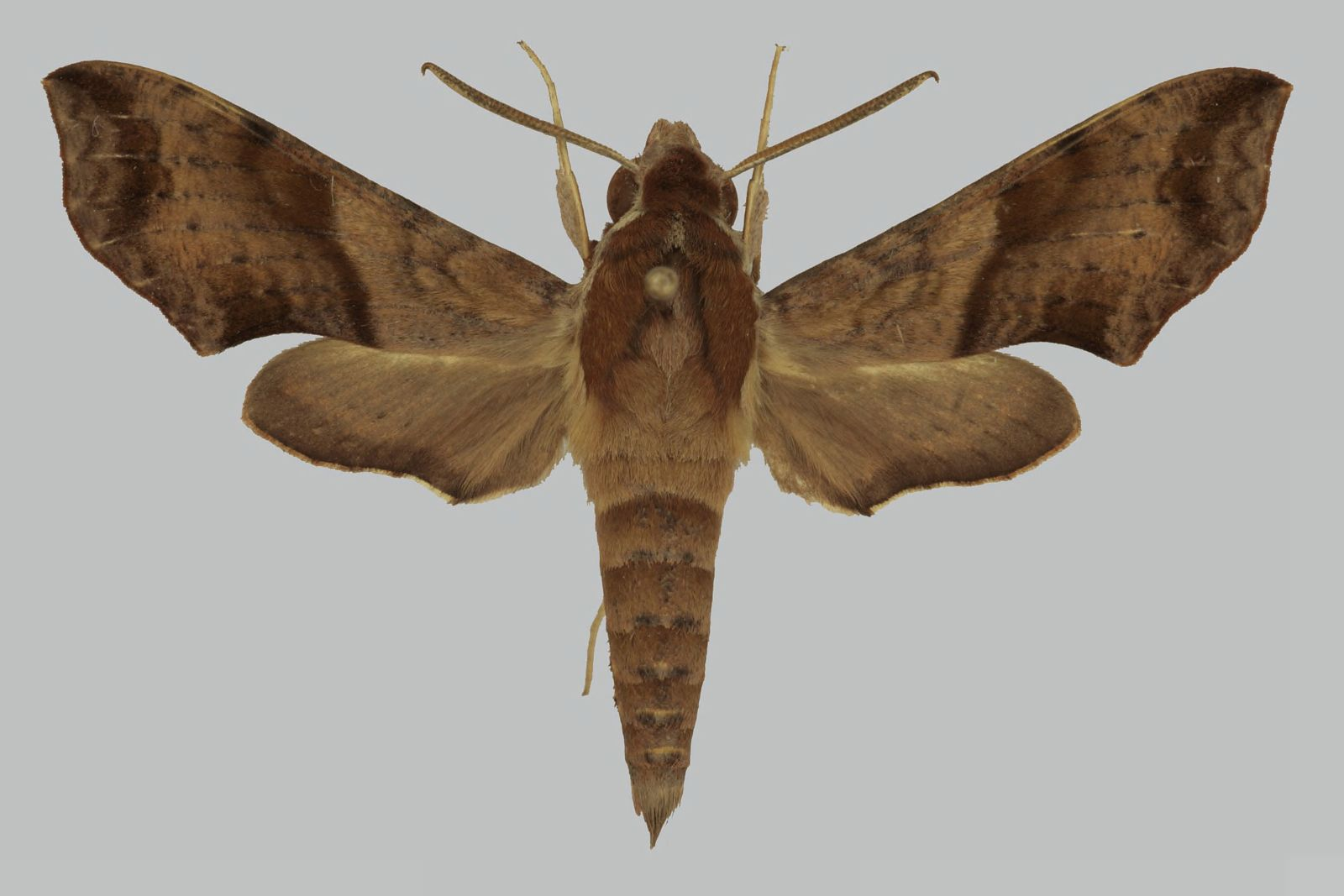

Scientific classification
- Kingdom: Animalia
- Phylum: Arthropoda
- Clade: Pancrustacea
- Class: Insecta
- Order: Lepidoptera
- Family: Sphingidae
- Genus: Hippotion
- Species: H. paukstadti

Binomial name
- Hippotion paukstadti Cadiou, 1995

= Hippotion paukstadti =

Species of moth

Hippotion paukstadti is a moth of the family Sphingidae. It is found in Indonesia.
