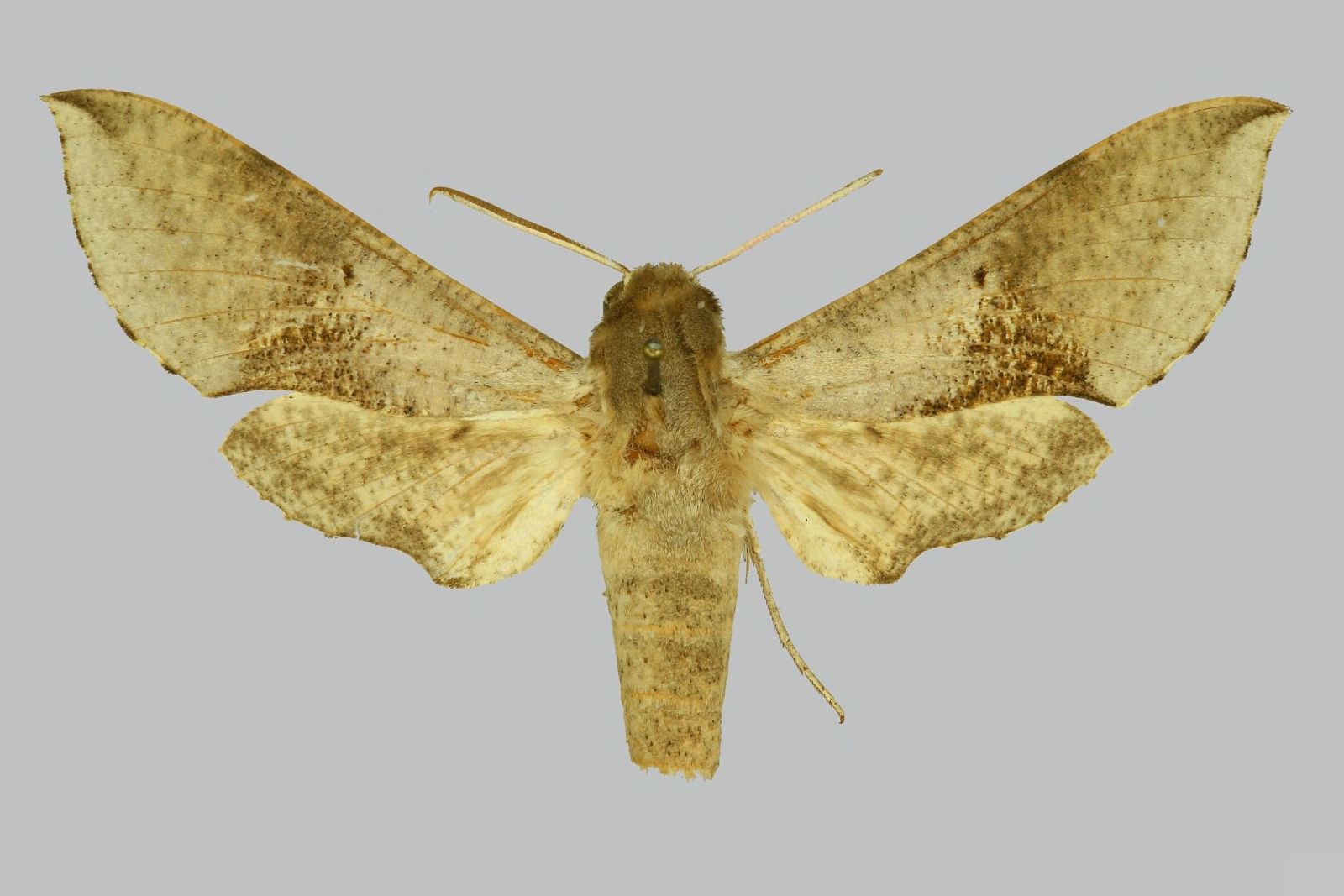
- Male

Scientific classification
- Kingdom: Animalia
- Phylum: Arthropoda
- Class: Insecta
- Order: Lepidoptera
- Family: Sphingidae
- Genus: Hippotion
- Species: H. dexippus

Binomial name
- Hippotion dexippus Fawcett, 1915

= Hippotion dexippus =

Species of moth

Hippotion dexippus is a moth of the family Sphingidae. It is known from dry areas in eastern Kenya.
