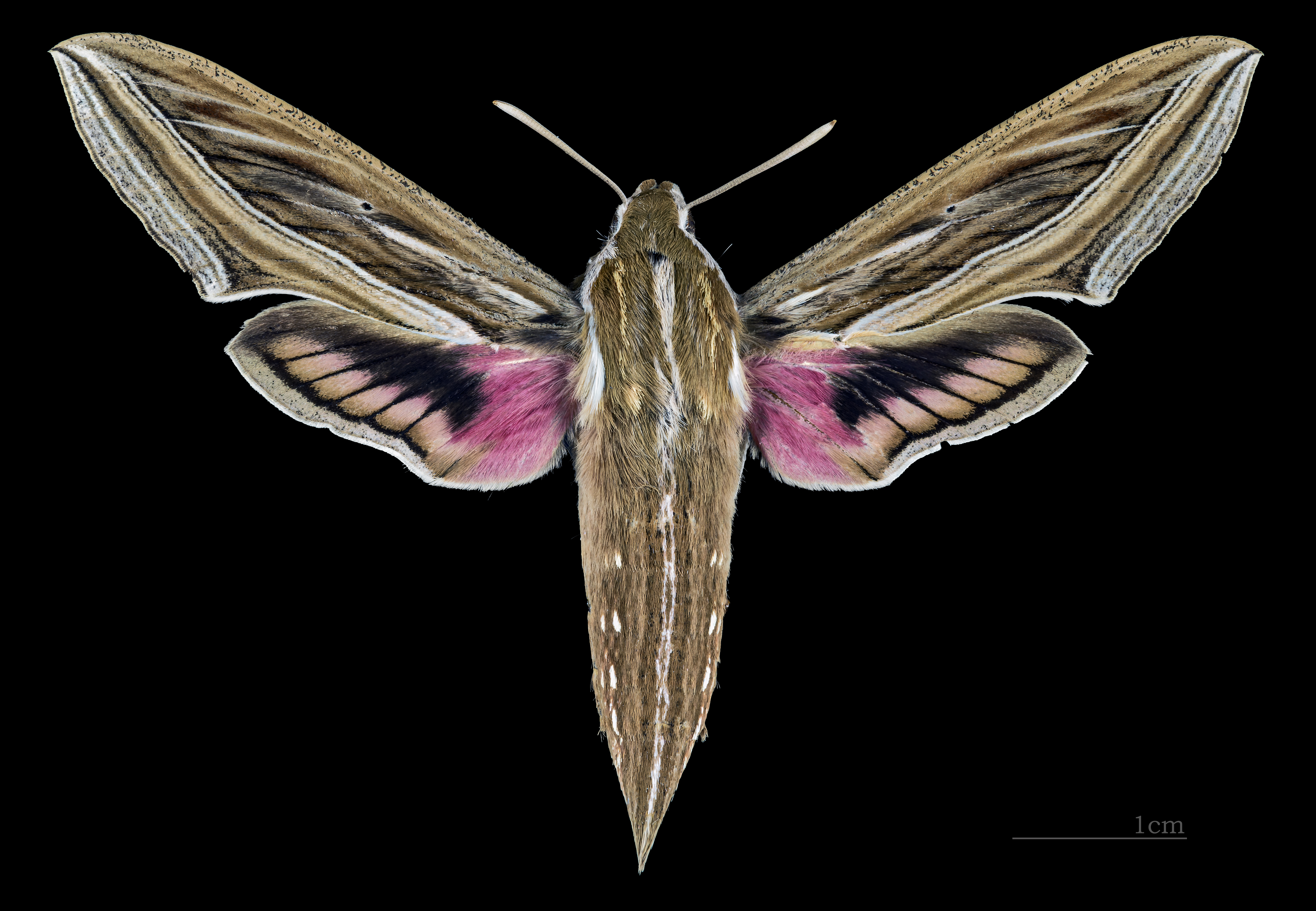
- Hippotion celerio

Scientific classification
- Domain: Eukaryota
- Kingdom: Animalia
- Phylum: Arthropoda
- Class: Insecta
- Order: Lepidoptera
- Family: Sphingidae
- Subfamily: Macroglossinae
- Tribe: Macroglossini
- Subtribe: Choerocampina
- Genus: Hippotion; Hübner, 1819

Synonyms
- Lilina Tutt, 1903; Panacra Walker, 1856

= Hippotion =

Genus of sphinx moths

Hippotion is a genus of sphinx moths. The genus was erected by Jacob Hübner in 1819.

== Species ==
- Hippotion adelinae Schmit, 2005
- Hippotion aporodes Rothschild & Jordan, 1910
- Hippotion aurora Rothschild & Jordan, 1903
- Hippotion balsaminae (Walker, 1856)
- Hippotion batschii (Keferstein, 1870)
- Hippotion boerhaviae (Fabricius, 1775)
- Hippotion brennus (Stoll, 1782)
- Hippotion brunnea (Semper, 1896)
- Hippotion butleri (Saalmuller, 1884)
- Hippotion celerio (Linnaeus, 1758) – type species
- Hippotion chloris Rothschild & Jordan, 1907
- Hippotion commatum Rothschild & Jordan, 1915
- Hippotion dexippus Fawcett, 1915
- Hippotion echeclus (Boisduval, 1875)
- Hippotion eson (Cramer, 1779)
- Hippotion geryon (Boisduval, 1875)
- Hippotion gracilis (Butler, 1875)
- Hippotion griveaudi Carcasson, 1968
- Hippotion hateleyi Holloway, 1990
- Hippotion irregularis (Walker, 1856)
- Hippotion isis Rothschild & Jordan, 1903
- Hippotion joiceyi Clark, 1922
- Hippotion leucocephalus Rober, 1929
- Hippotion melichari Haxaire, 2001
- Hippotion moorei Jordan, 1926
- Hippotion osiris (Dalman, 1823)
- Hippotion paukstadti Cadiou, 1995
- Hippotion pentagramma Hampson, 1910
- Hippotion psammochroma Basquin, 1989
- Hippotion rafflesii (Moore, 1858)
- Hippotion rebeli Rothschild & Jordan, 1903
- Hippotion rosae (Butler, 1882)
- Hippotion roseipennis (Butler, 1882)
- Hippotion rosetta (C. Swinhoe, 1892)
- Hippotion saclavorum (Boisduval, 1933)
- Hippotion scrofa (Boisduval, 1832)
- Hippotion socotrensis (Rebel, 1899)
- Hippotion stigma Rothschild & Jordan, 1903
- Hippotion talboti Clark, 1930
- Hippotion velox (Fabricius, 1793)

== Ecology ==
=== Pollination ===
Several species of the genus Hippotion have been identified as likely pollinators of the orchid species Cyrtorchis okuensis.

== Gallery ==
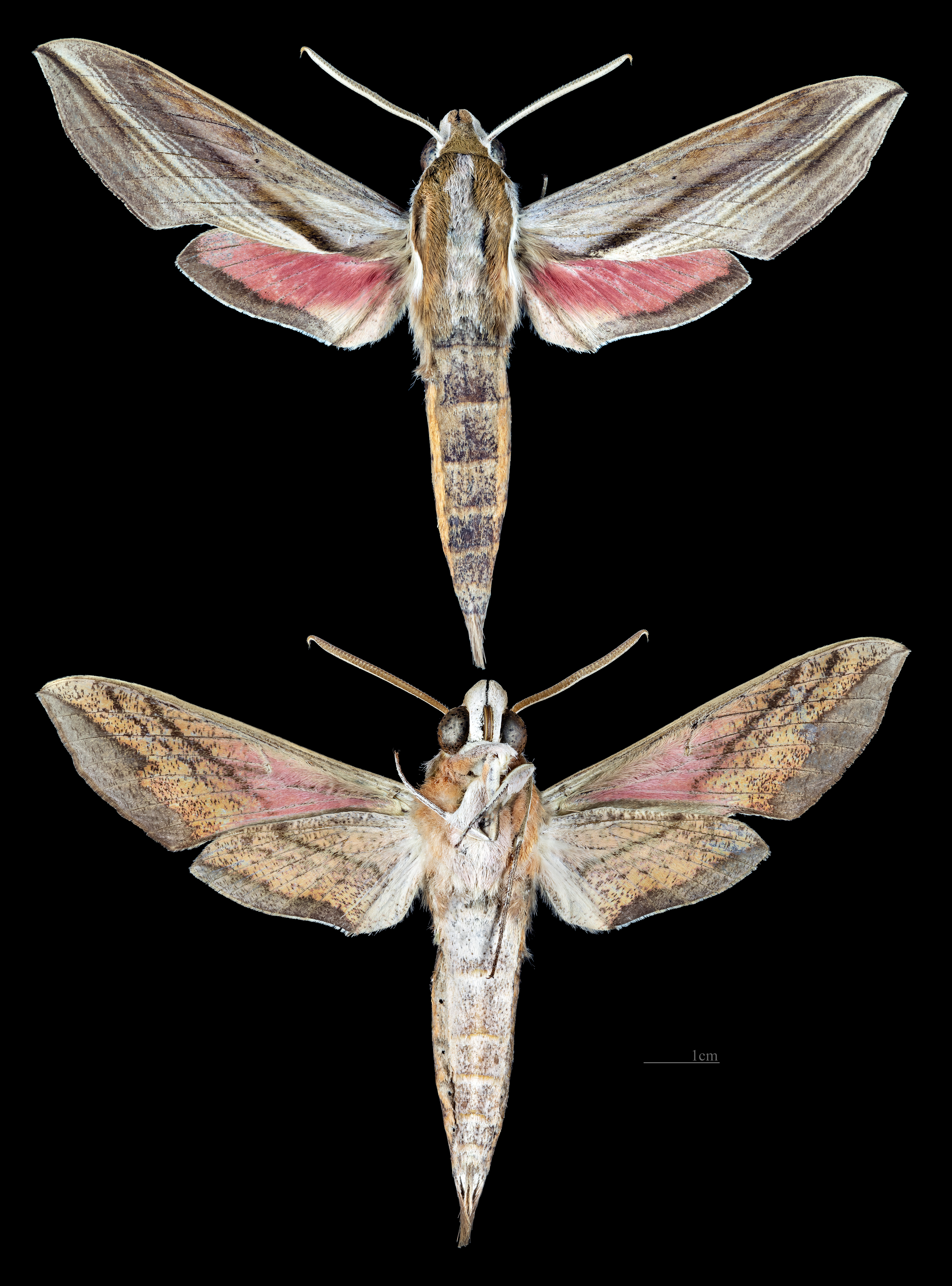
Hippotion boerhaviae

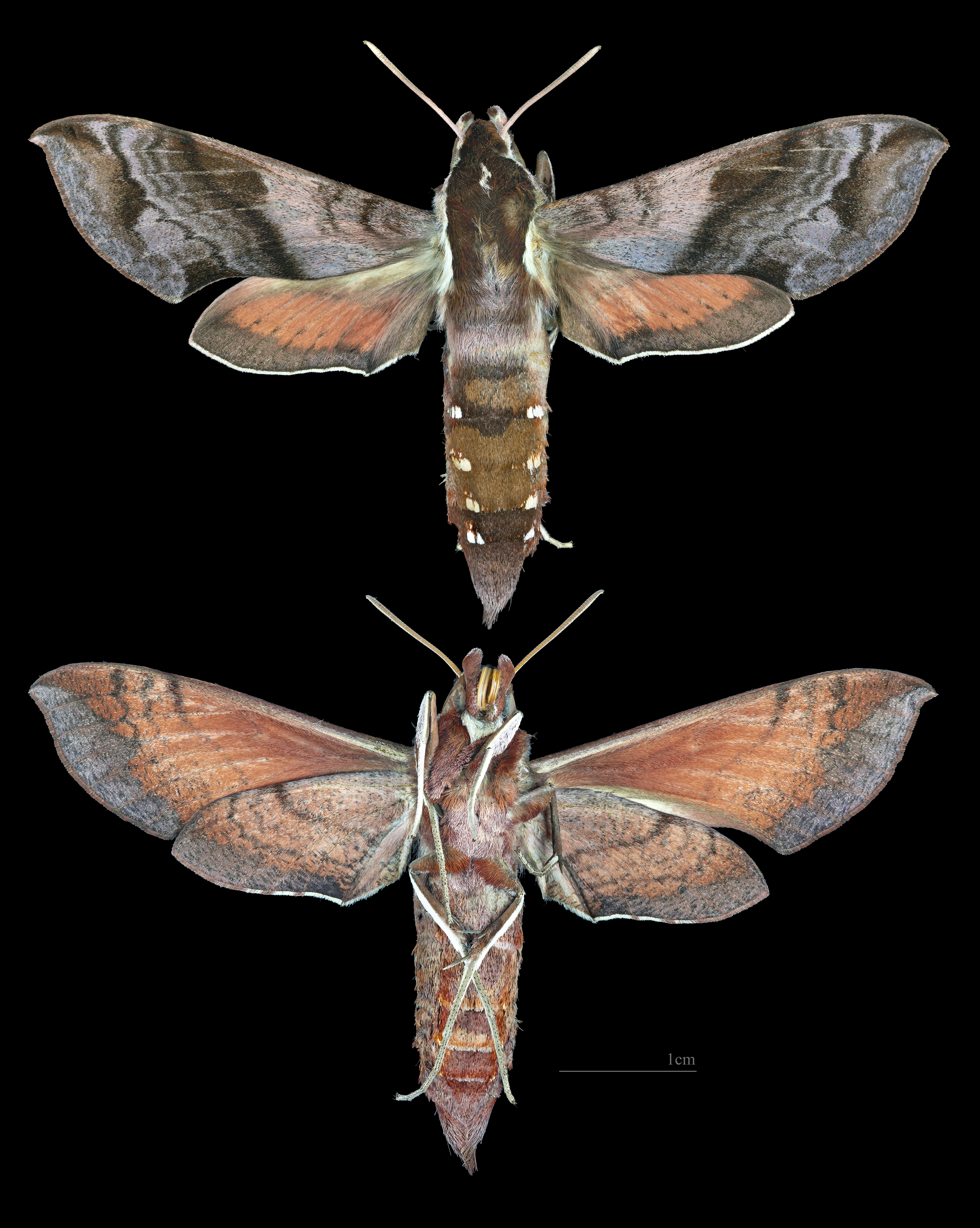
Hippotion brennus

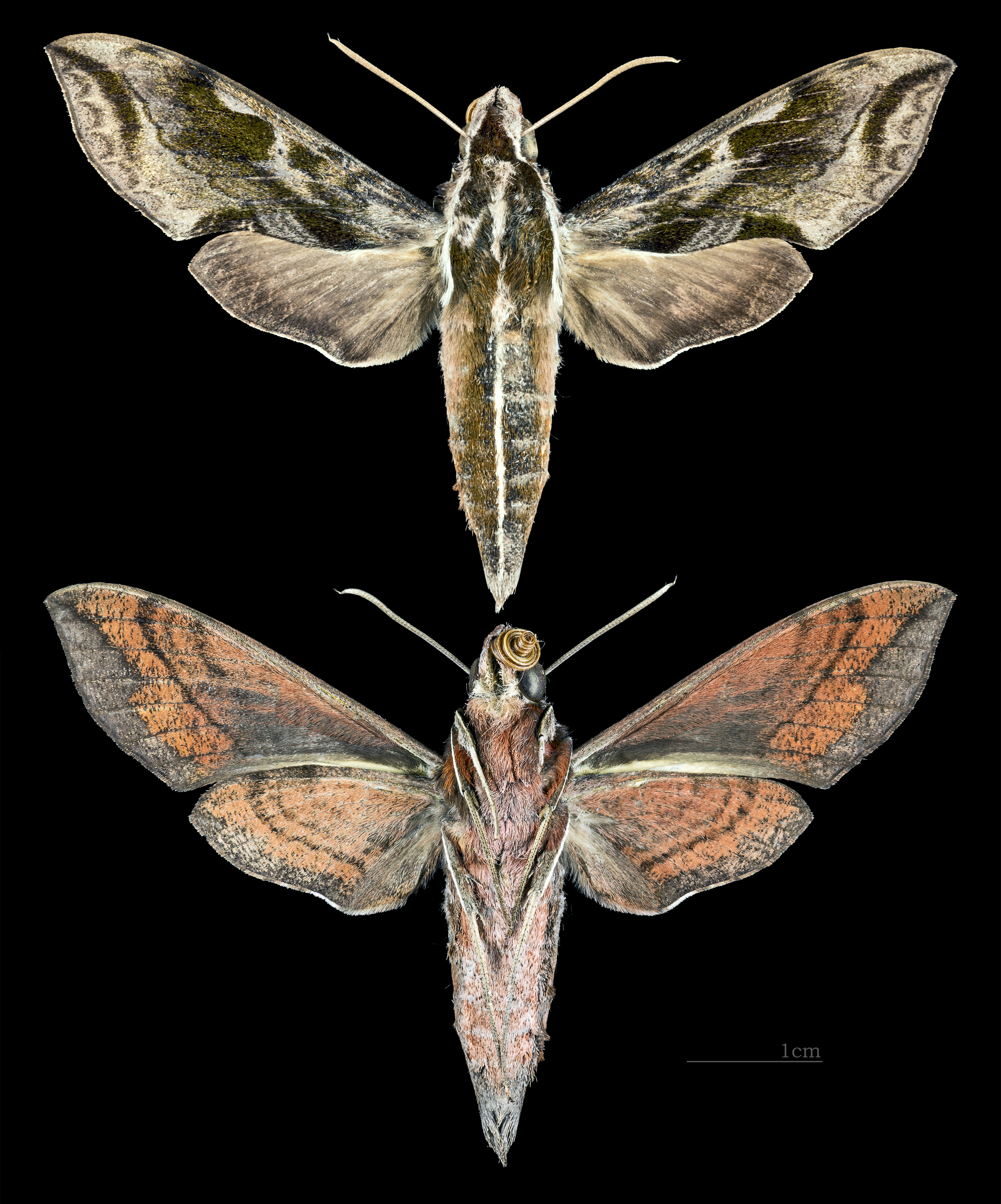
Hippotion brunnea

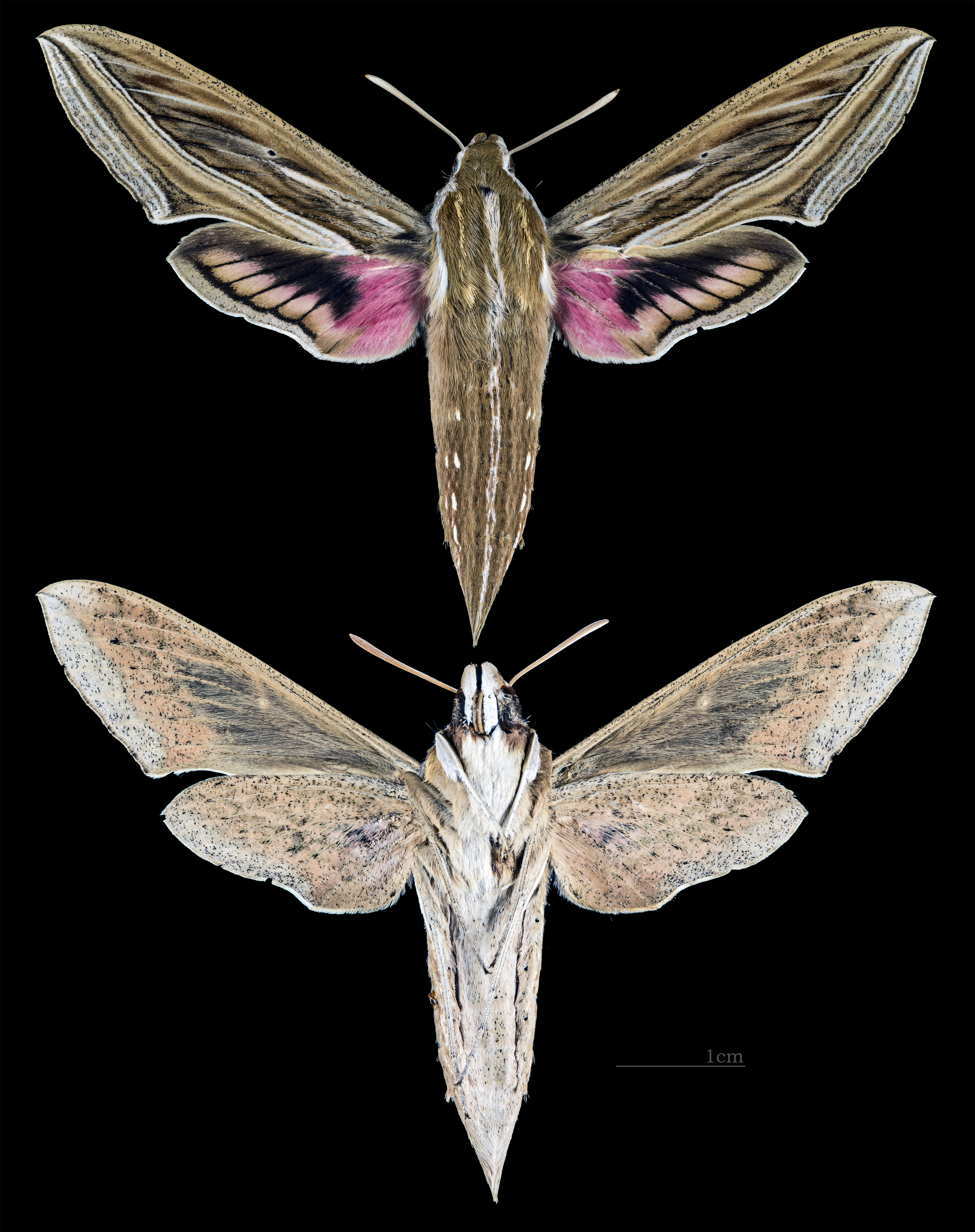
Hippotion celerio

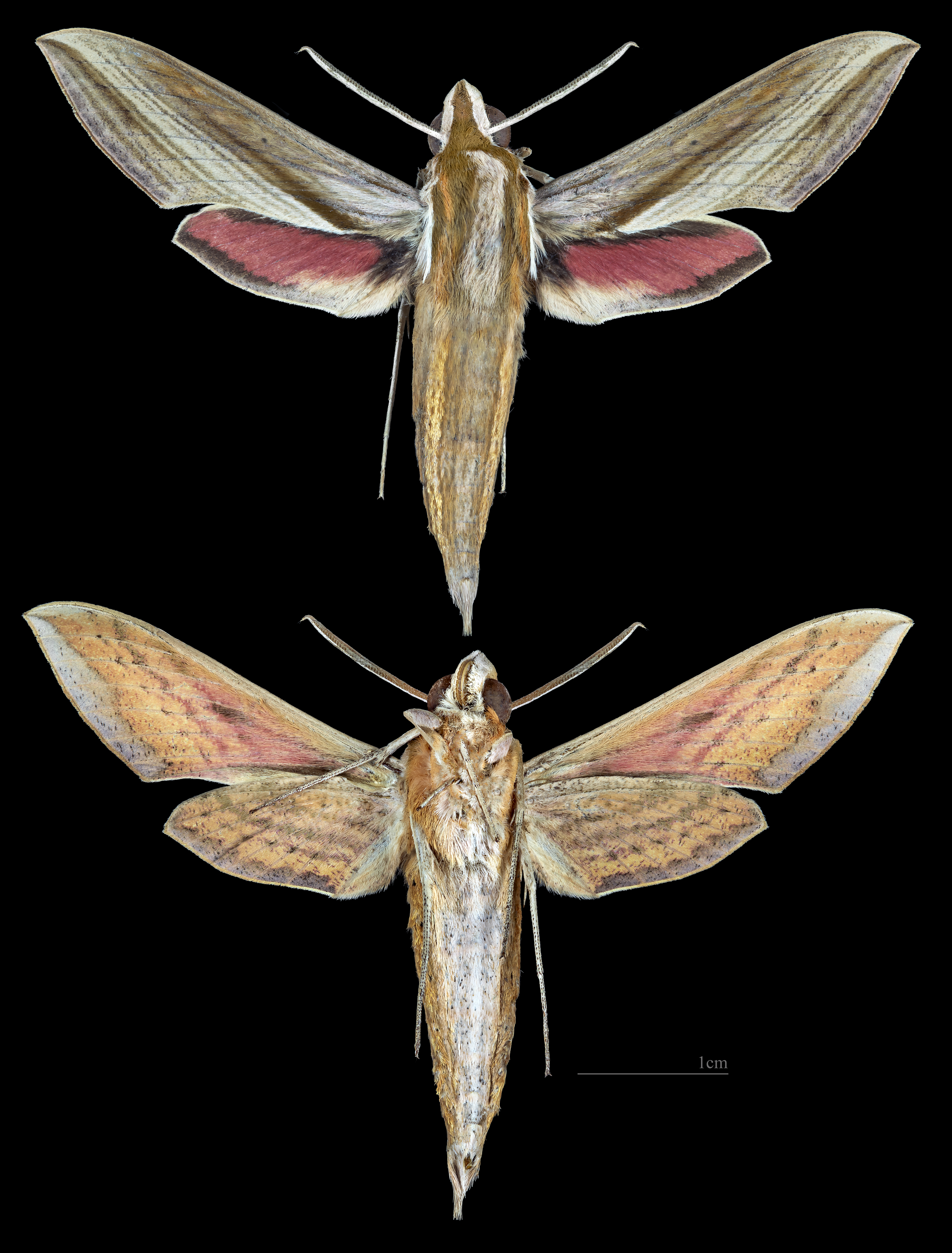
Hippotion echeclus

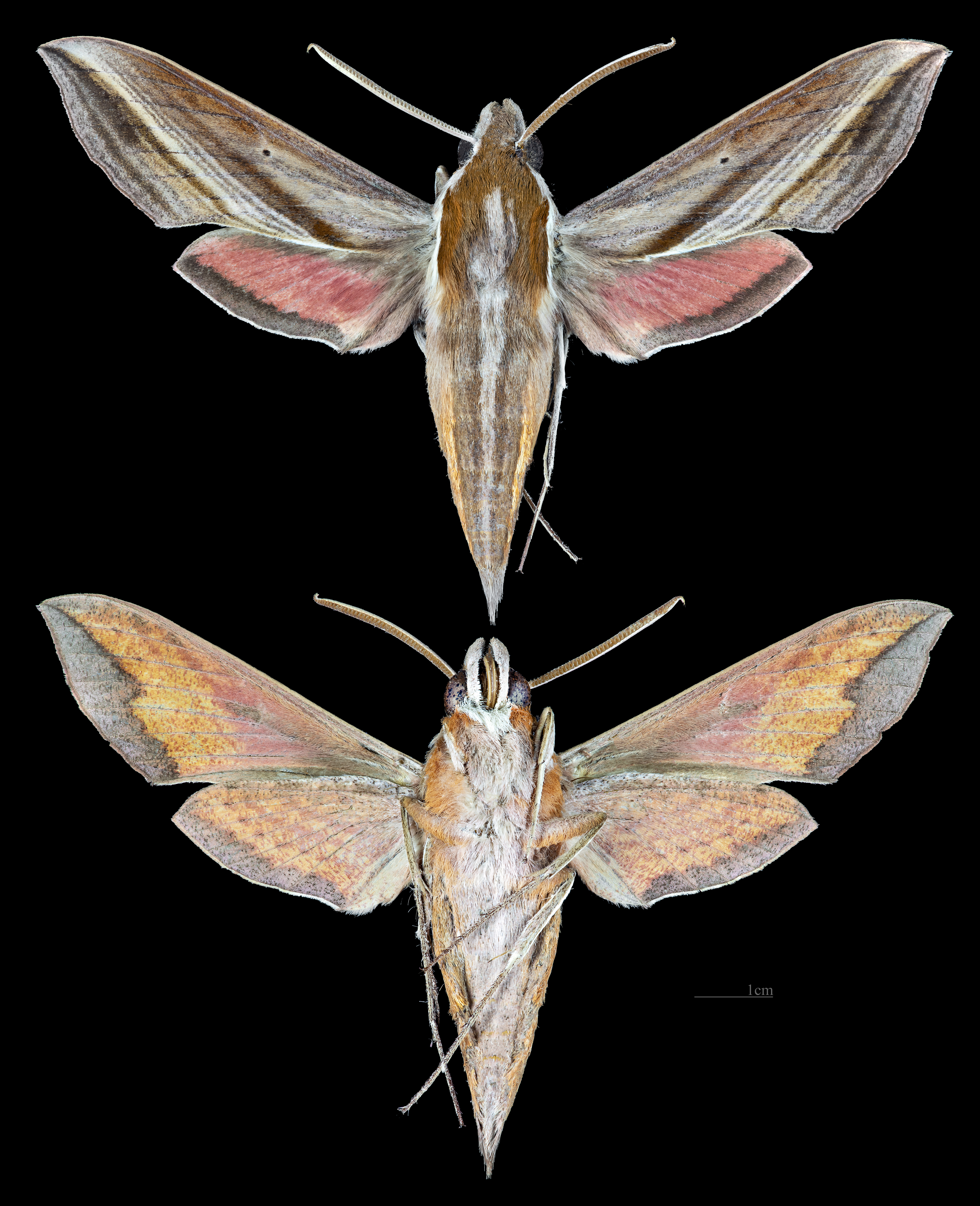
Hippotion rafflesii

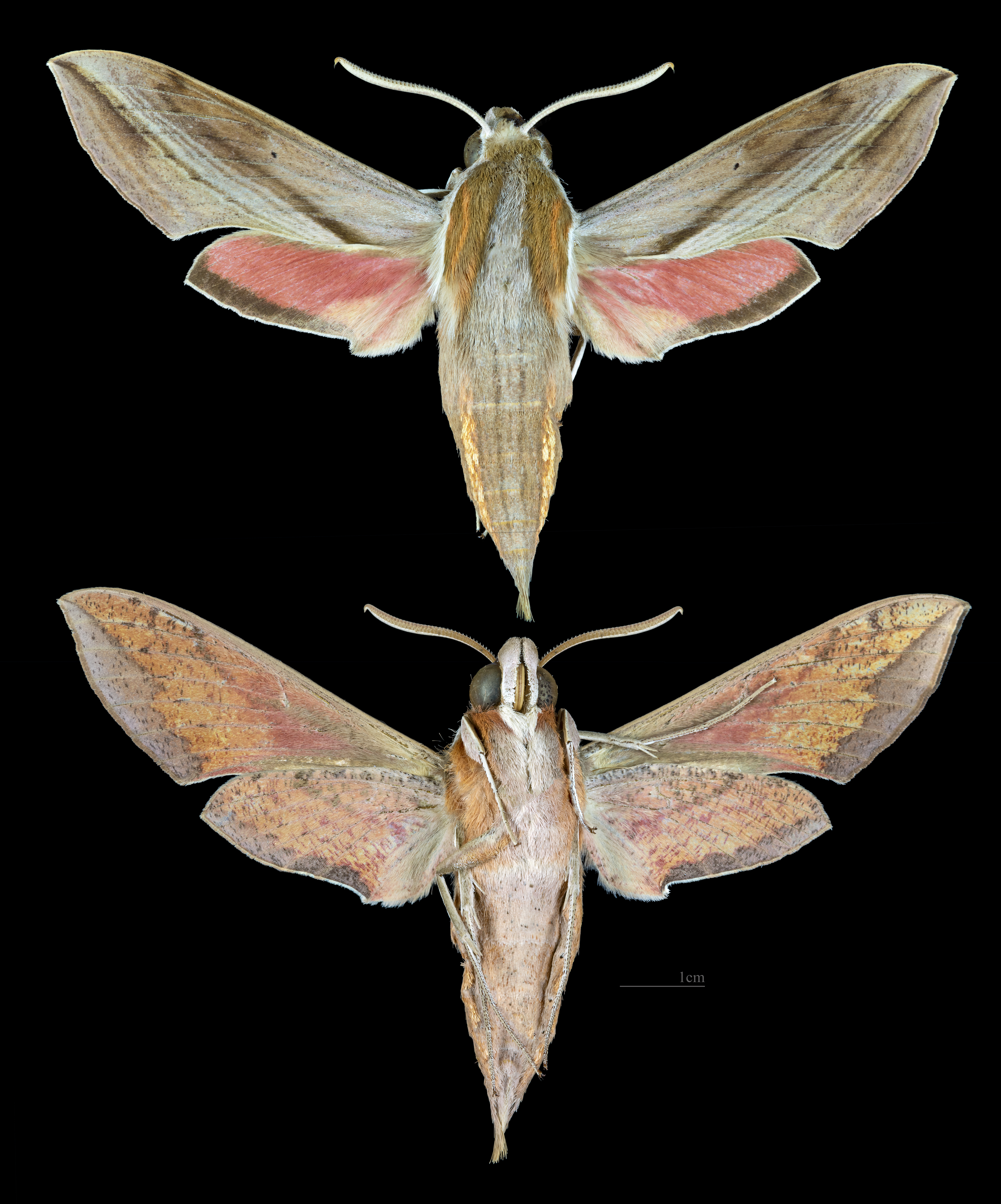
Hippotion rosetta

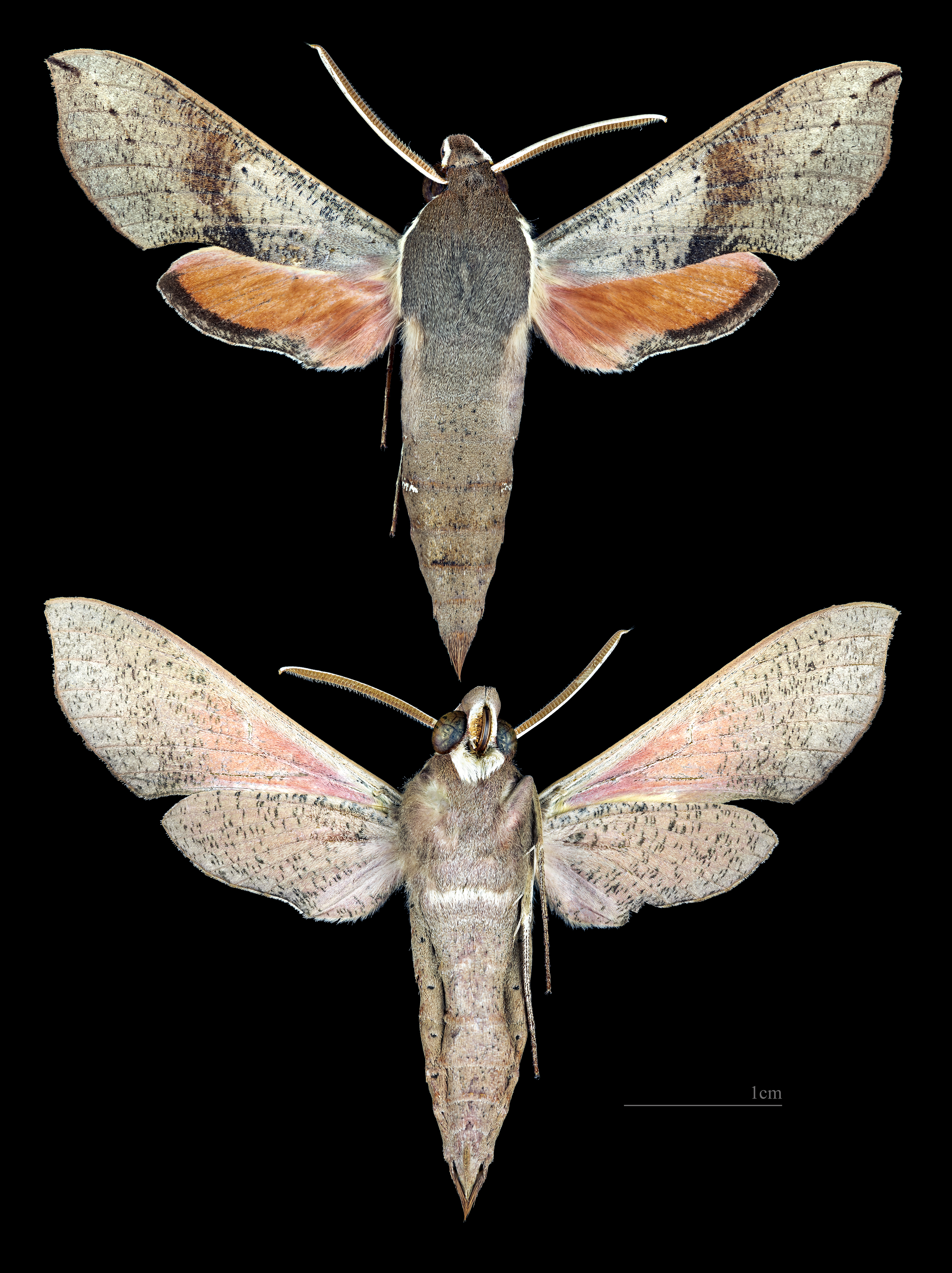
Hippotion scrofa

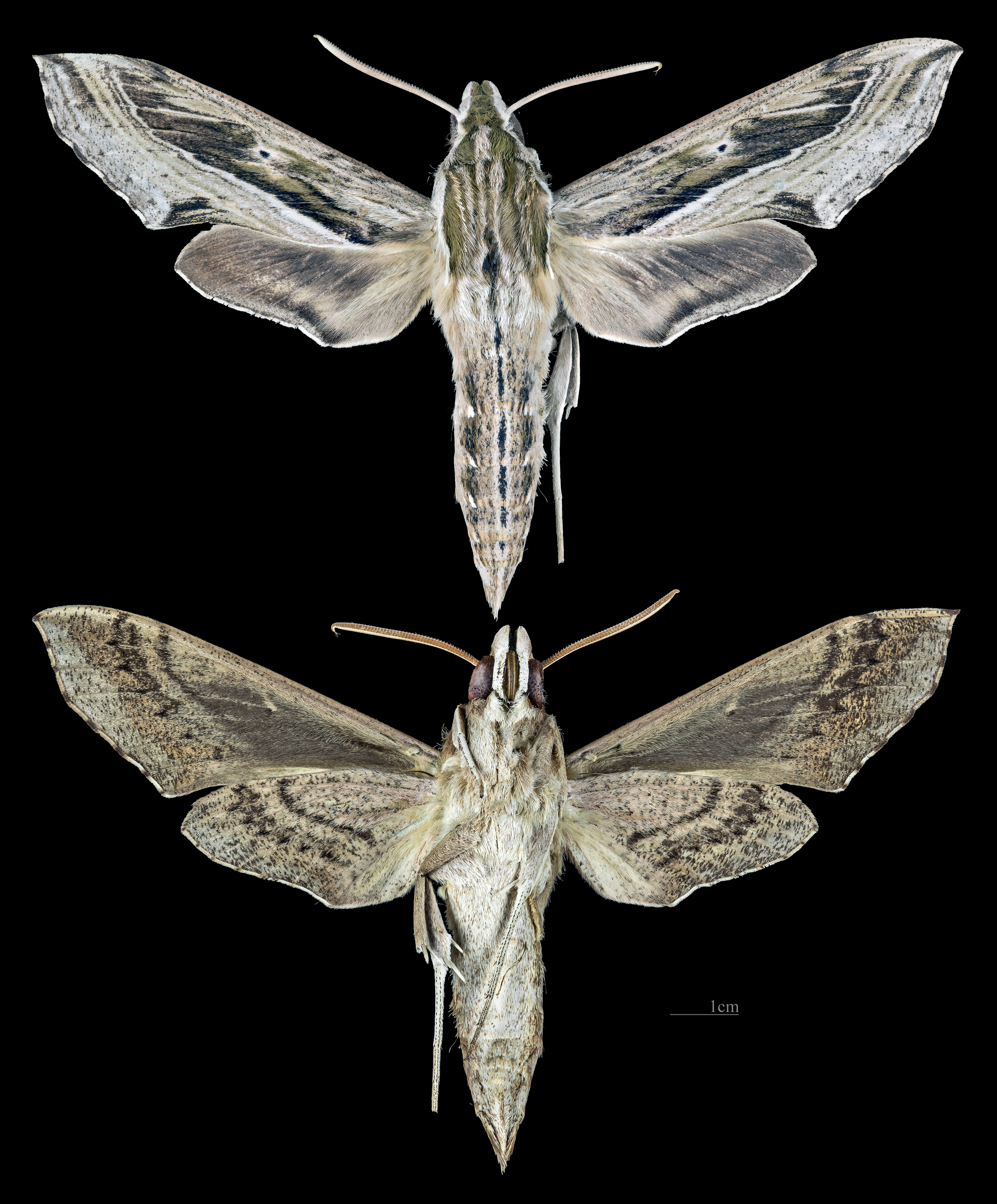
Hippotion velox
