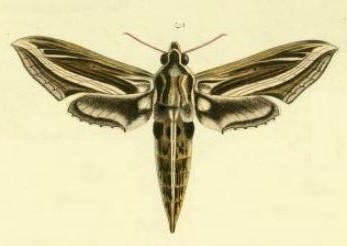

Scientific classification
- Kingdom: Animalia
- Phylum: Arthropoda
- Class: Insecta
- Order: Lepidoptera
- Family: Sphingidae
- Genus: Hippotion
- Species: H. geryon

Binomial name
- Hippotion geryon (Boisduval, 1875)

Synonyms
- Choerocampa geryon Boisduval, 1875

= Hippotion geryon =

Species of moth

Hippotion geryon is a moth of the family Sphingidae. It is known from Madagascar and the Comoro Islands.

It is similar to Hippotion osiris, but is immediately distinguishable by the lack of pink coloration on the hindwing upperside and the single pair of black abdominal patches. The upperside of the antennae is conspicuously pink-scaled. The base of the abdomen has a single pair of large, square, black subdorsal patches. The forewing upperside is very similar to Hippotion osiris but differing in the distal part of the longitudinal pale band through the discal cell being absent beyond the discal spot. The hindwing upperside is dark brown with a buff patch on the inner margin and a buff postmedian band.
