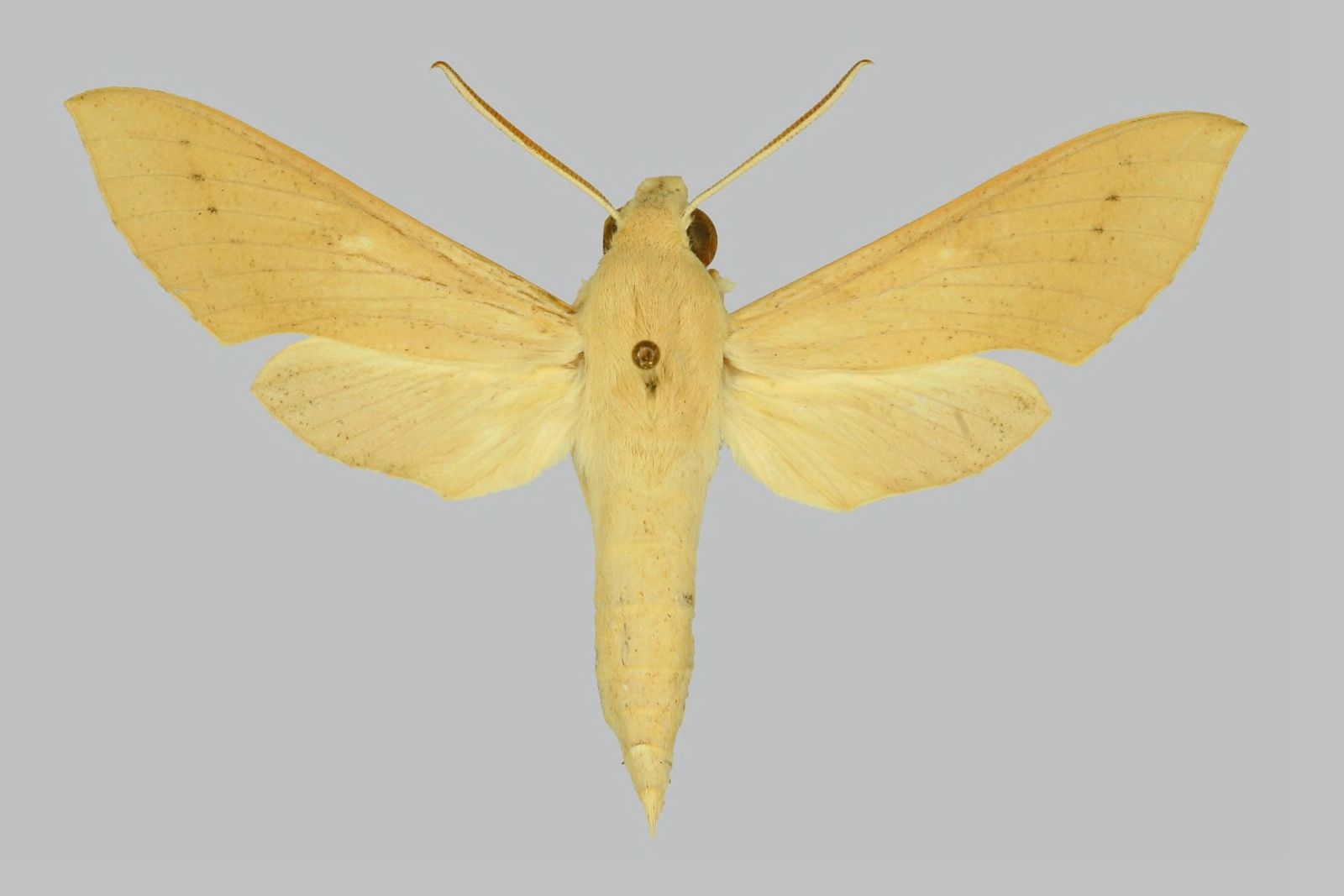
- Hippotion psammochroma

Scientific classification
- Kingdom: Animalia
- Phylum: Arthropoda
- Clade: Pancrustacea
- Class: Insecta
- Order: Lepidoptera
- Family: Sphingidae
- Genus: Hippotion
- Species: H. psammochroma

Binomial name
- Hippotion psammochroma Basquin, 1989

= Hippotion psammochroma =

Species of moth

Hippotion psammochroma is a moth of the family Sphingidae. It is found in Burkina Faso. It was described by Jean-Pierre Lequeux in 1989.
