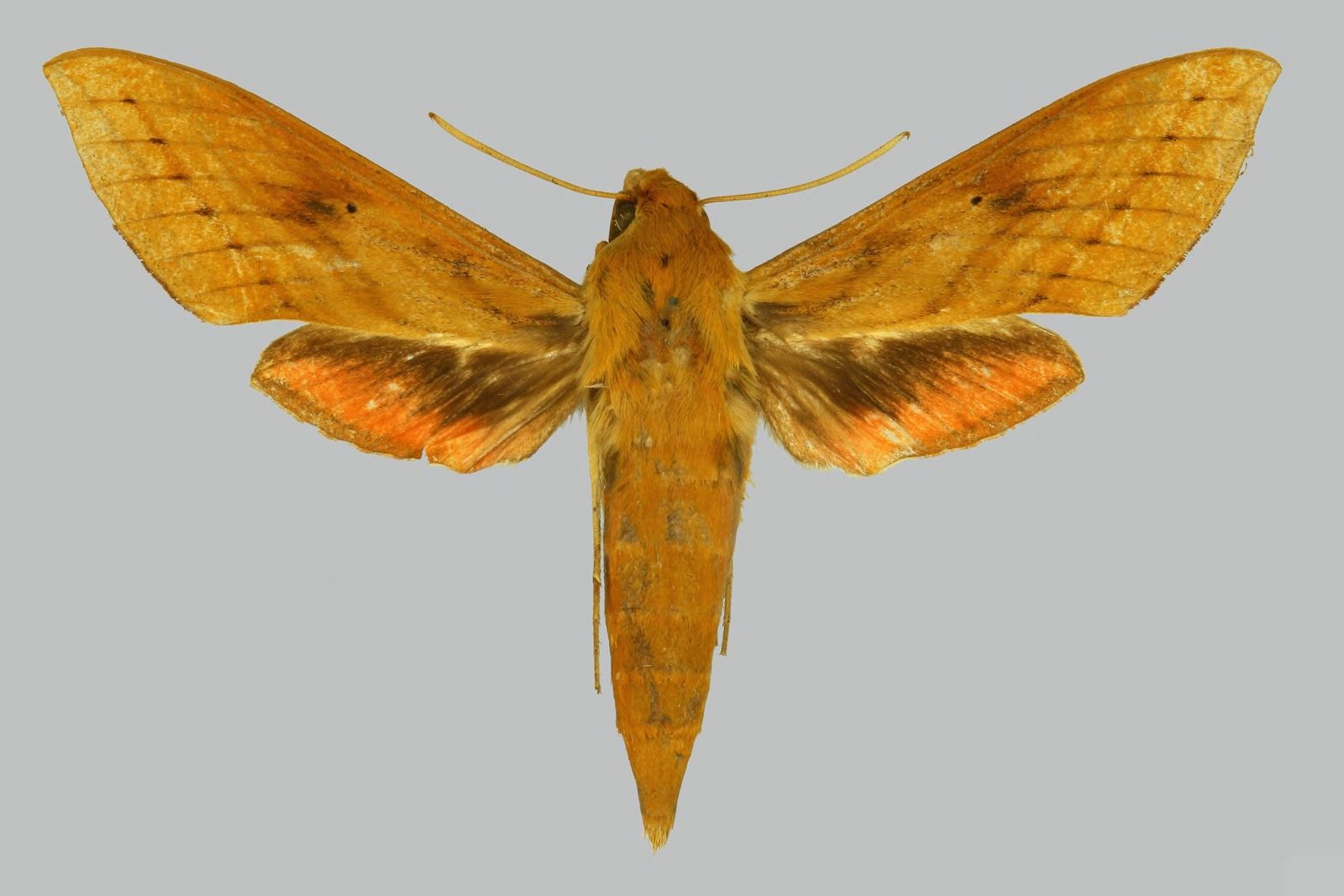

Scientific classification
- Kingdom: Animalia
- Phylum: Arthropoda
- Class: Insecta
- Order: Lepidoptera
- Family: Sphingidae
- Genus: Hippotion
- Species: H. talboti

Binomial name
- Hippotion talboti Clark, 1930

= Hippotion talboti =

Species of moth

Hippotion talboti is a moth species of the family Sphingidae. It occurs on São Tomé Island.
