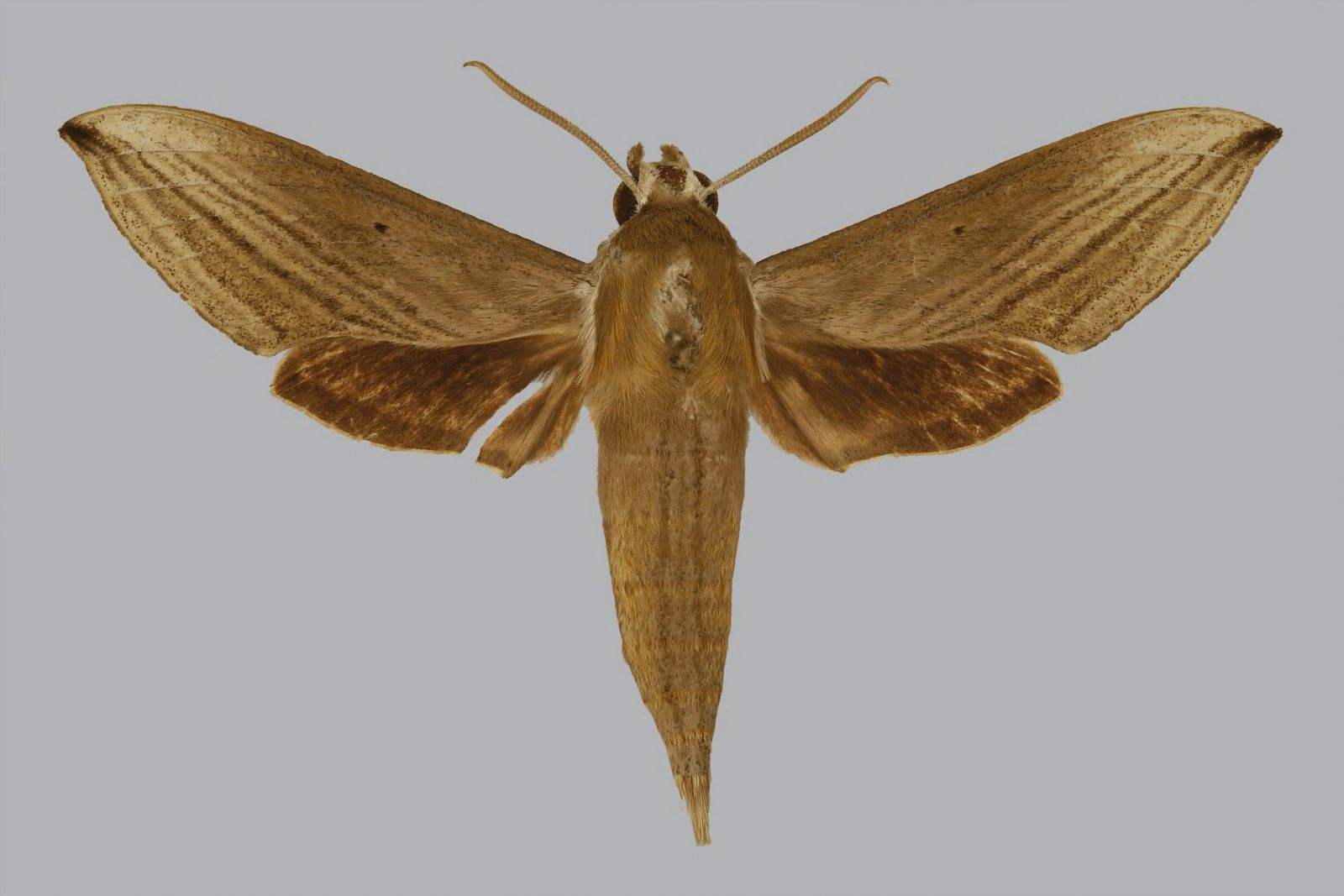

Scientific classification
- Kingdom: Animalia
- Phylum: Arthropoda
- Class: Insecta
- Order: Lepidoptera
- Family: Sphingidae
- Genus: Hippotion
- Species: H. melichari

Binomial name
- Hippotion melichari Haxaire, 2001

= Hippotion melichari =

Species of moth

Hippotion melichari is a moth of the family Sphingidae. It is found in Madagascar.
