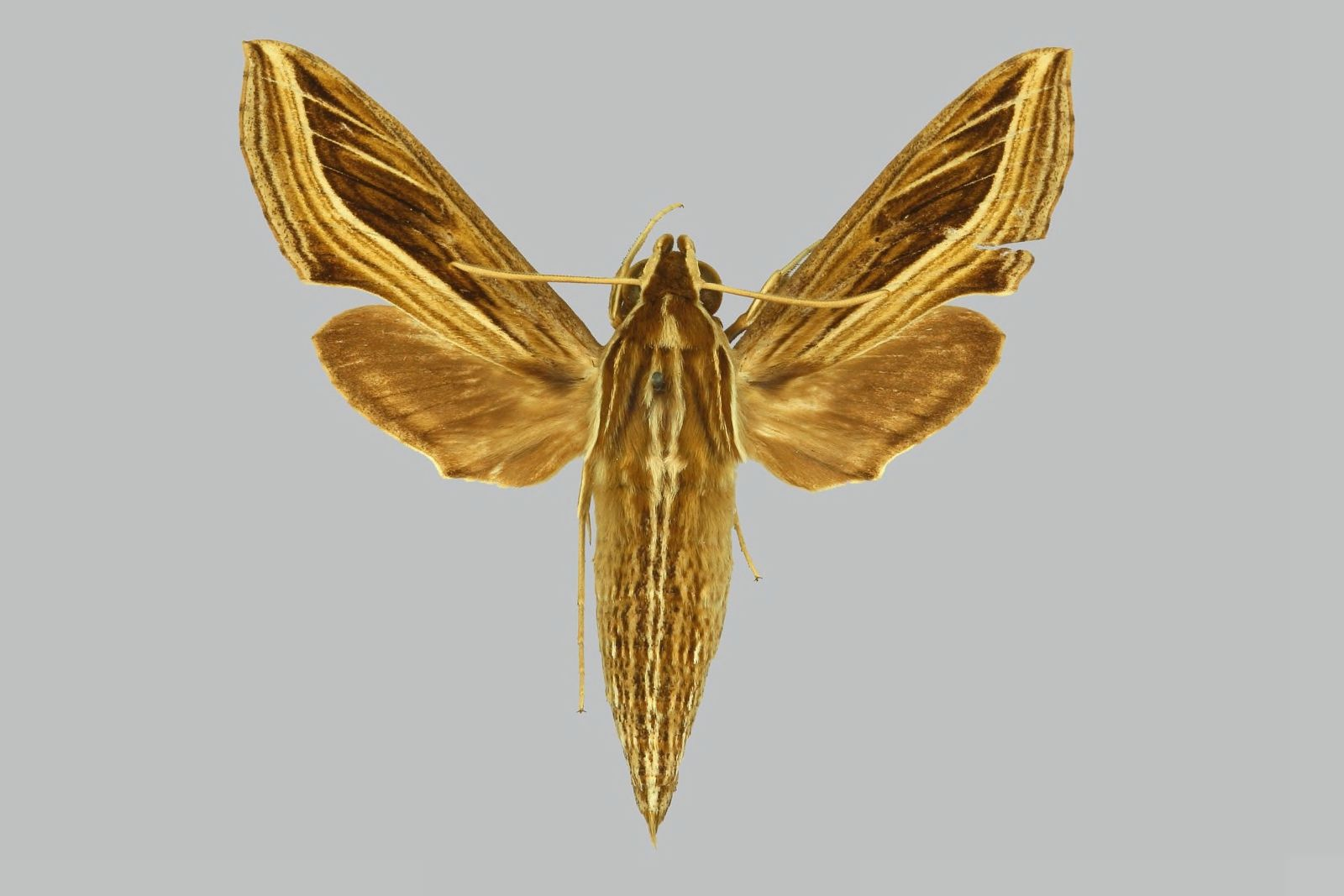

Scientific classification
- Kingdom: Animalia
- Phylum: Arthropoda
- Class: Insecta
- Order: Lepidoptera
- Family: Sphingidae
- Genus: Hippotion
- Species: H. commatum

Binomial name
- Hippotion commatum Rothschild & Jordan, 1915

= Hippotion commatum =

Species of moth

Hippotion commatum is a moth of the family Sphingidae. It is known from Papua New Guinea.

The length of the forewings is 37–38 mm. The abdomen upperside is similar to Hippotion velox, but the paired oblique subdorsal silvery dashes are replaced by elongate greyish-white spots that are parallel to the dorsal line. The forewing upperside is also similar to Hippotion velox.
