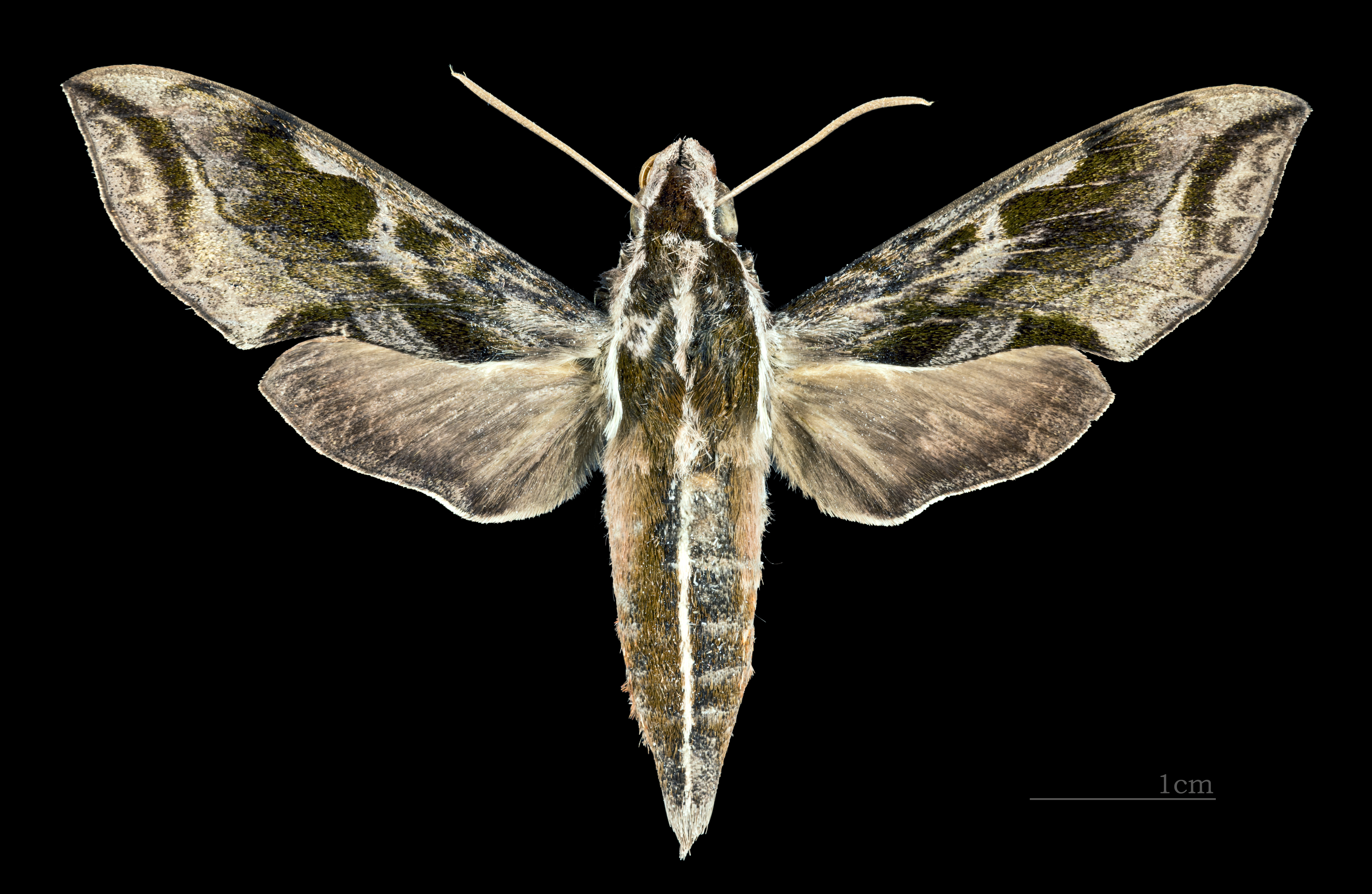
- Hippotion brunnea Dorsal
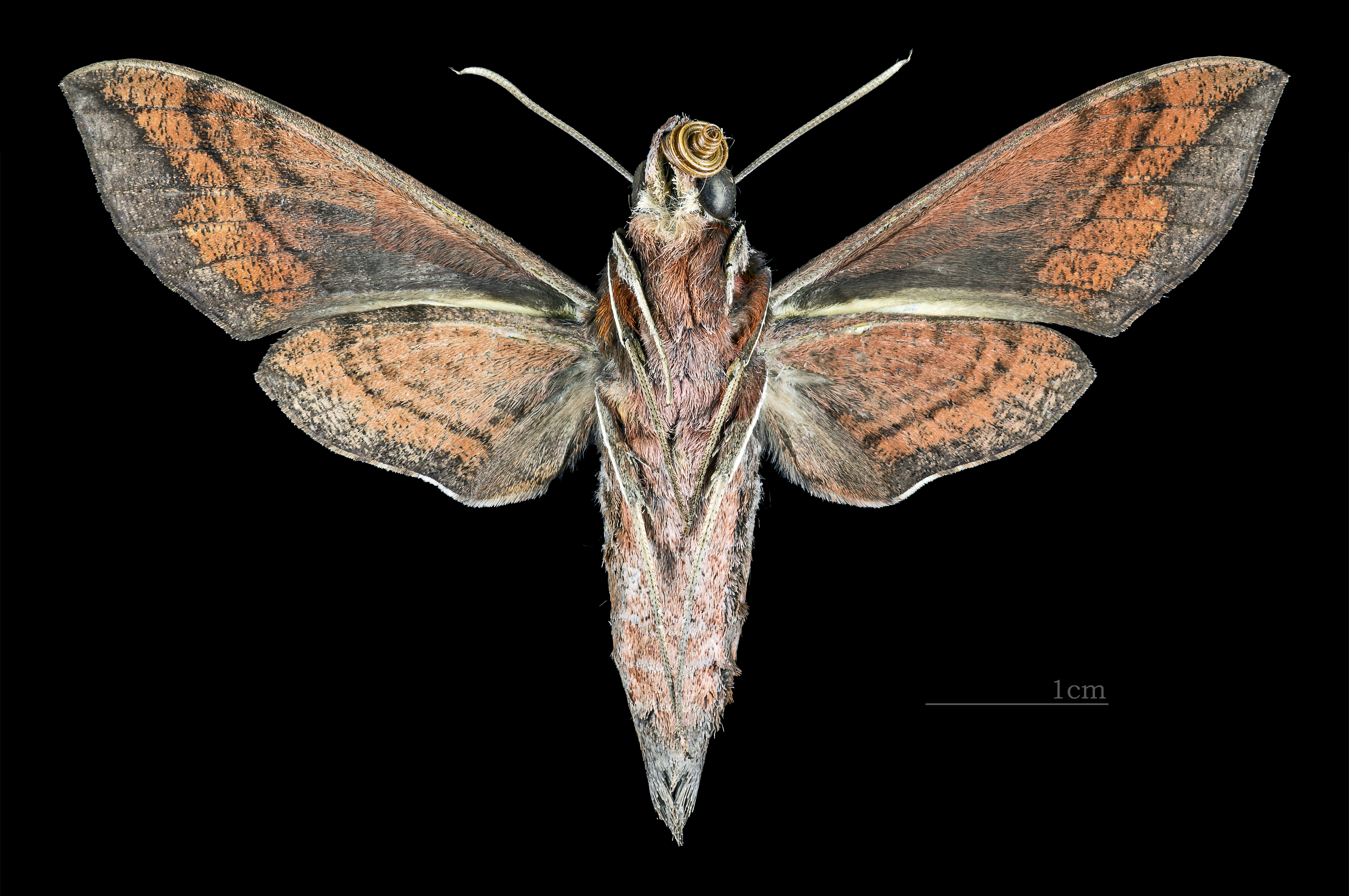
- Hippotion brunnea Ventral

Scientific classification
- Kingdom: Animalia
- Phylum: Arthropoda
- Class: Insecta
- Order: Lepidoptera
- Family: Sphingidae
- Genus: Hippotion
- Species: H. brunnea

Binomial name
- Hippotion brunnea (Semper, 1896)

Synonyms
- Chaerocampa brunnea Semper, 1896; Panacra buruensis Rothschild, 1899

= Hippotion brunnea =

Species of moth

Hippotion brunnea is a moth of the family Sphingidae. It is known from Indonesia.

It is similar in forewing pattern to Hippotion brennus form rubribrenna but distinguishable by the entirely brown hindwing upperside, the strong white dorsal line running from the head to the tip of the abdomen and the lack of subdorsal abdominal silvery-white patches. The upperside of the head, thorax and abdomen have a strong white dorsal line. The hindwing upperside is brown. The marginal band is slightly darker.
