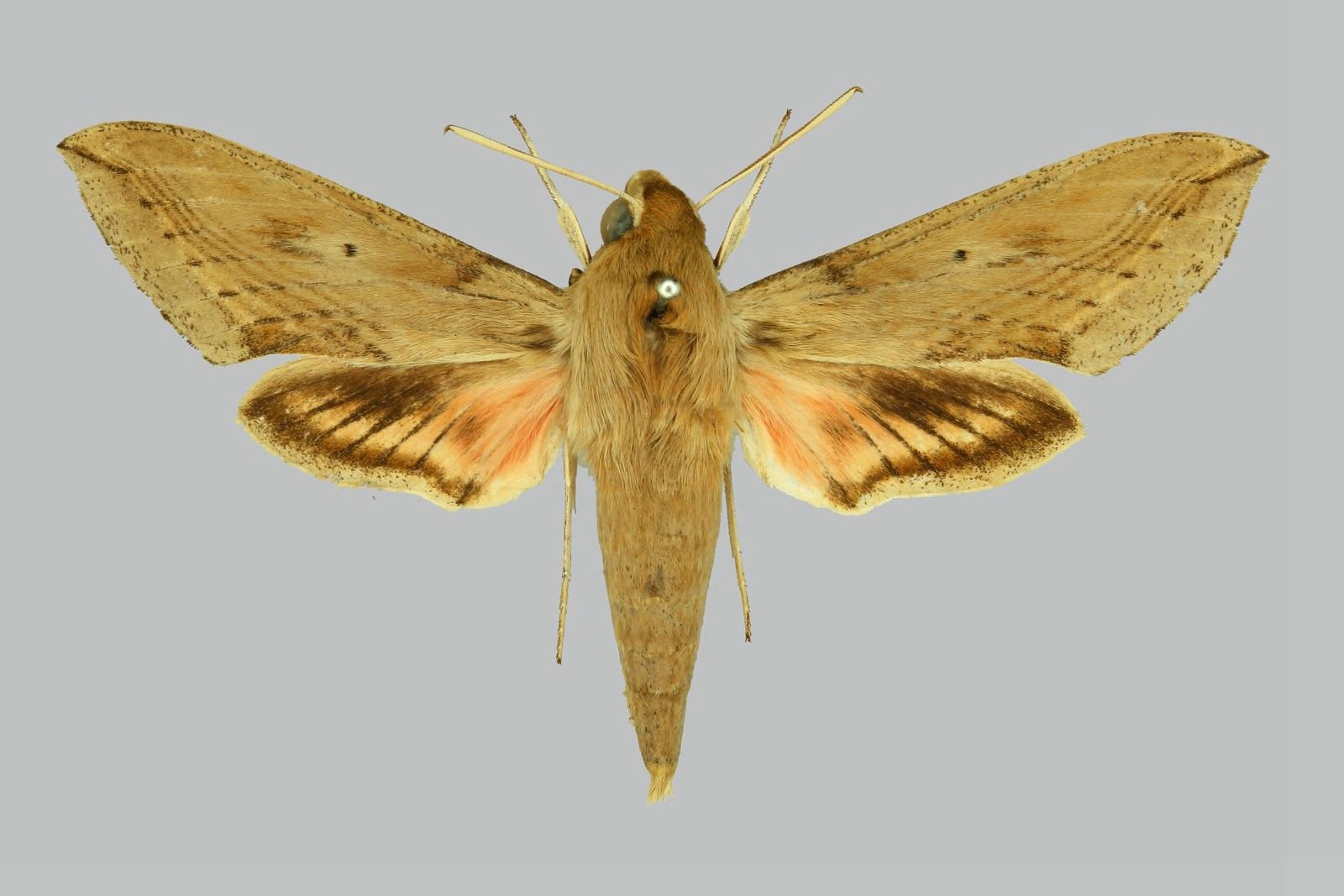

Scientific classification
- Kingdom: Animalia
- Phylum: Arthropoda
- Class: Insecta
- Order: Lepidoptera
- Family: Sphingidae
- Genus: Hippotion
- Species: H. isis

Binomial name
- Hippotion isis Rothschild & Jordan, 1903

= Hippotion isis =

Species of moth

Hippotion isis is a moth of the family Sphingidae. It is known from Mauritius.

The length of the forewings is about 29 mm. It is extremely similar to Hippotion aurora delicata but differing in the buff colour of the median band of the hindwing upperside and the absence of any dorsal longitudinal lines on the abdomen.
