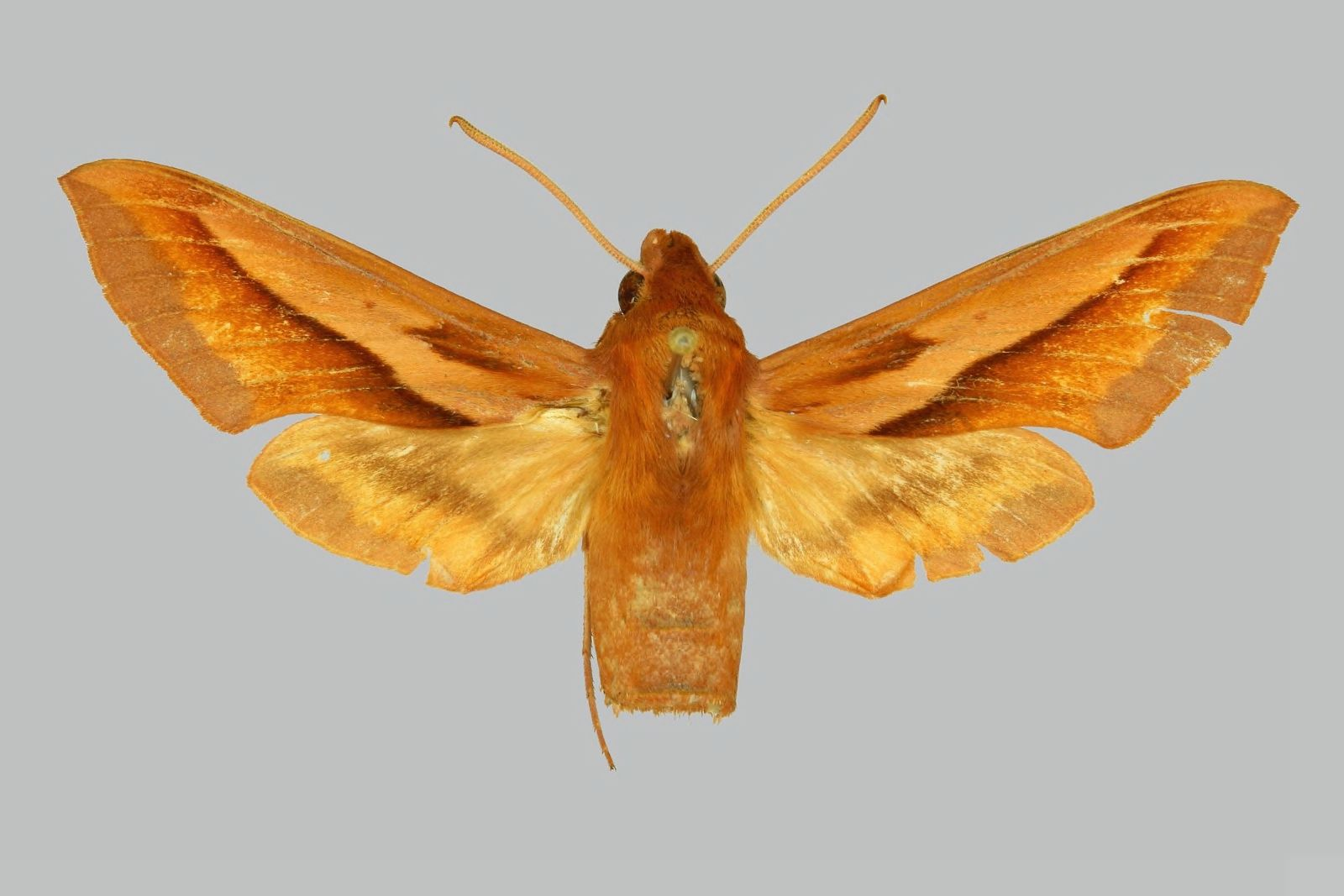

Scientific classification
- Kingdom: Animalia
- Phylum: Arthropoda
- Clade: Pancrustacea
- Class: Insecta
- Order: Lepidoptera
- Family: Sphingidae
- Genus: Hippotion
- Species: H. hateleyi

Binomial name
- Hippotion hateleyi Holloway, 1990

= Hippotion hateleyi =

Species of moth

Hippotion hateleyi is a moth of the family Sphingidae. It is known from Henderson Island.
