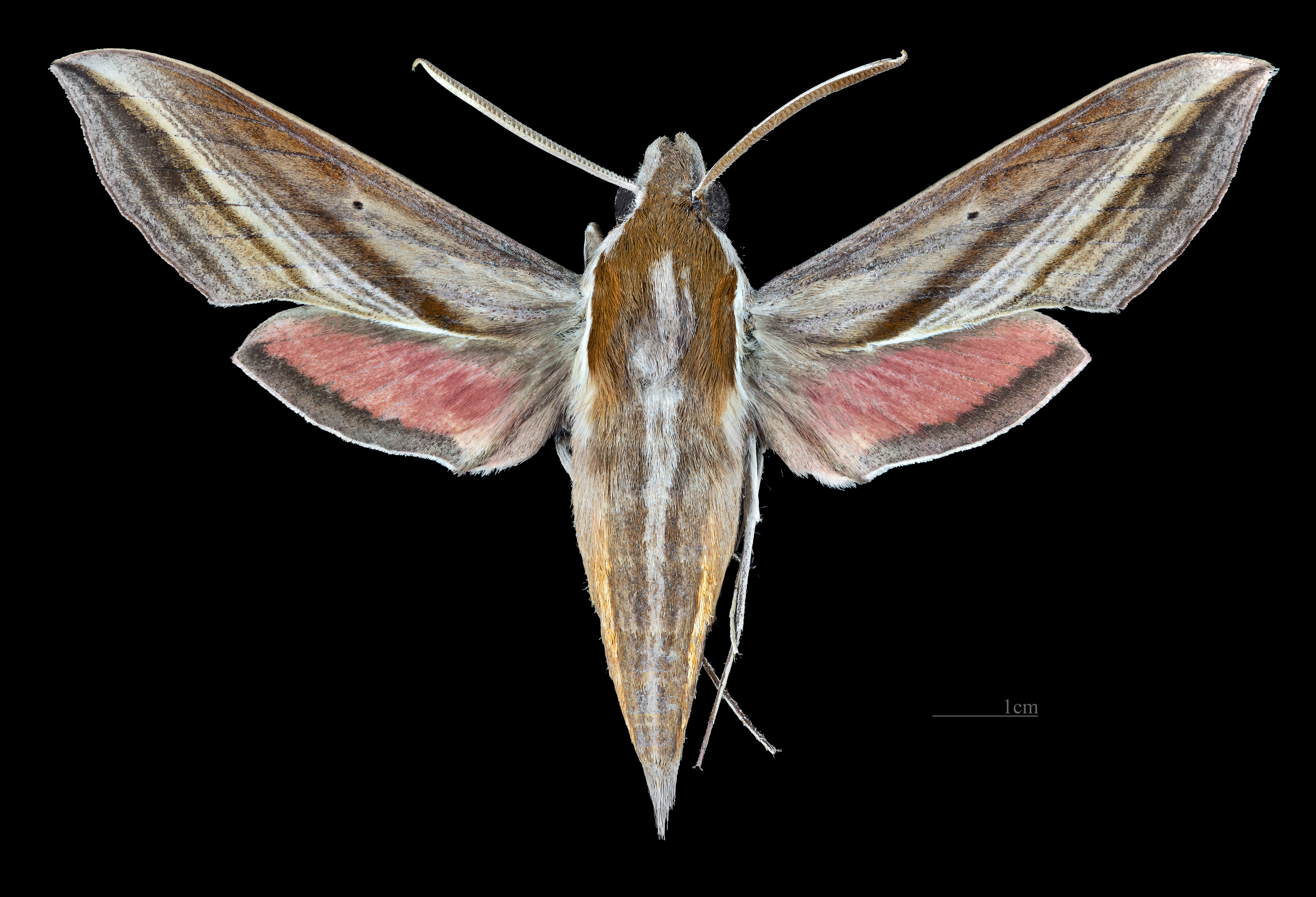
- Hippotion rafflesii rafflesii male upperside
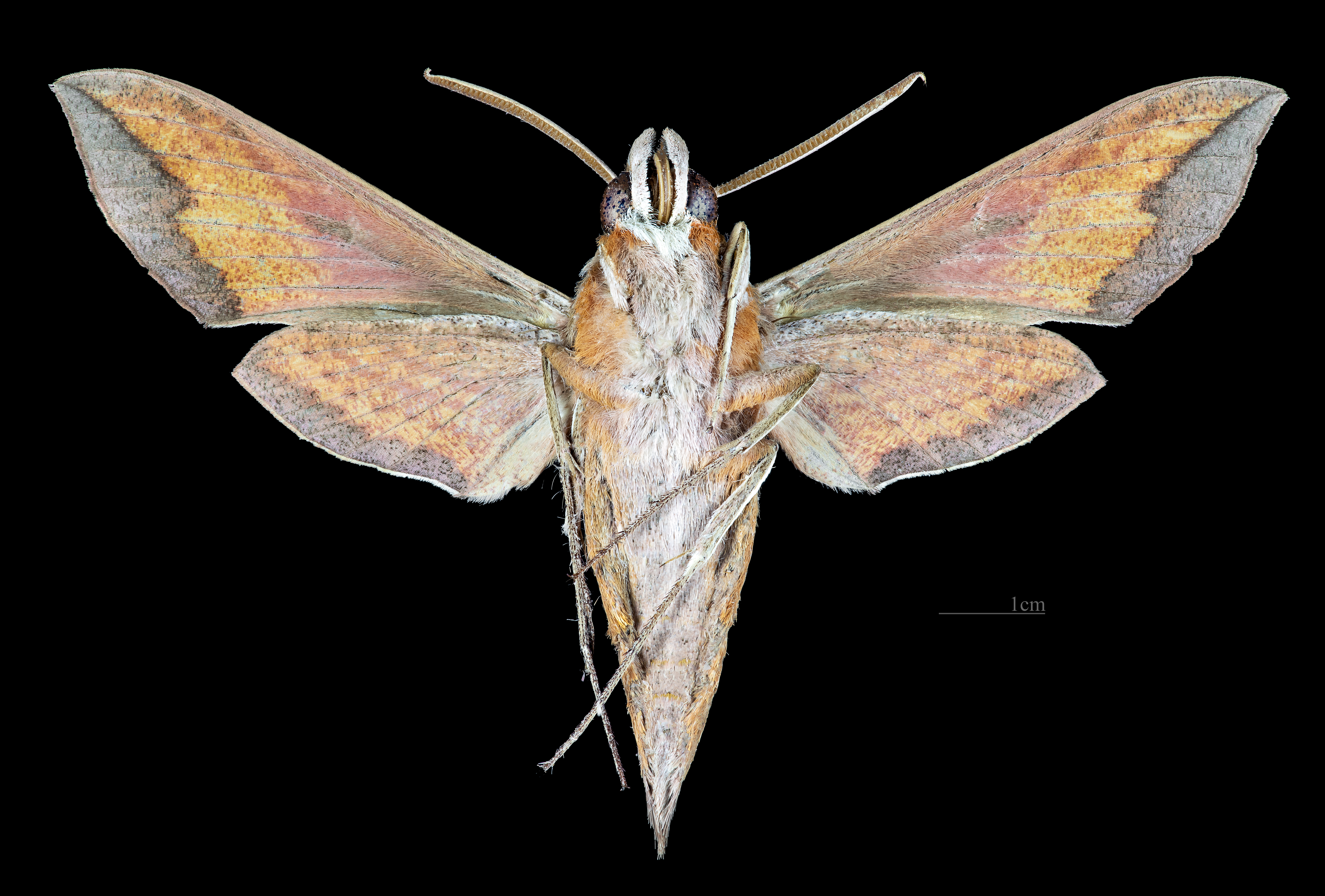
- Hippotion rafflesii rafflesii male underside

Scientific classification
- Kingdom: Animalia
- Phylum: Arthropoda
- Class: Insecta
- Order: Lepidoptera
- Family: Sphingidae
- Genus: Hippotion
- Species: H. rafflesii

Binomial name
- Hippotion rafflesii Disputed. Authority is either (Moore 1858) or (Butler, 1877)

Synonyms
- Deilephila rafflesii Moore, 1858; Chaerocampa theylia Hampson, 1893; Chaerocampa vinacea Hampson, 1893

= Hippotion rafflesii =

Raffles' striated hawkmoth

Species of moth

Hippotion rafflesii, the Raffles' striated hawkmoth, is a moth of the family Sphingidae. It is known from Sri Lanka, southern and eastern India, Nepal, Myanmar, Thailand, southern China, Malaysia (Peninsular), Indonesia (Sumatra, Java, Sulawesi) and the Philippines.

== Description ==
The wingspan is 56–70 mm.

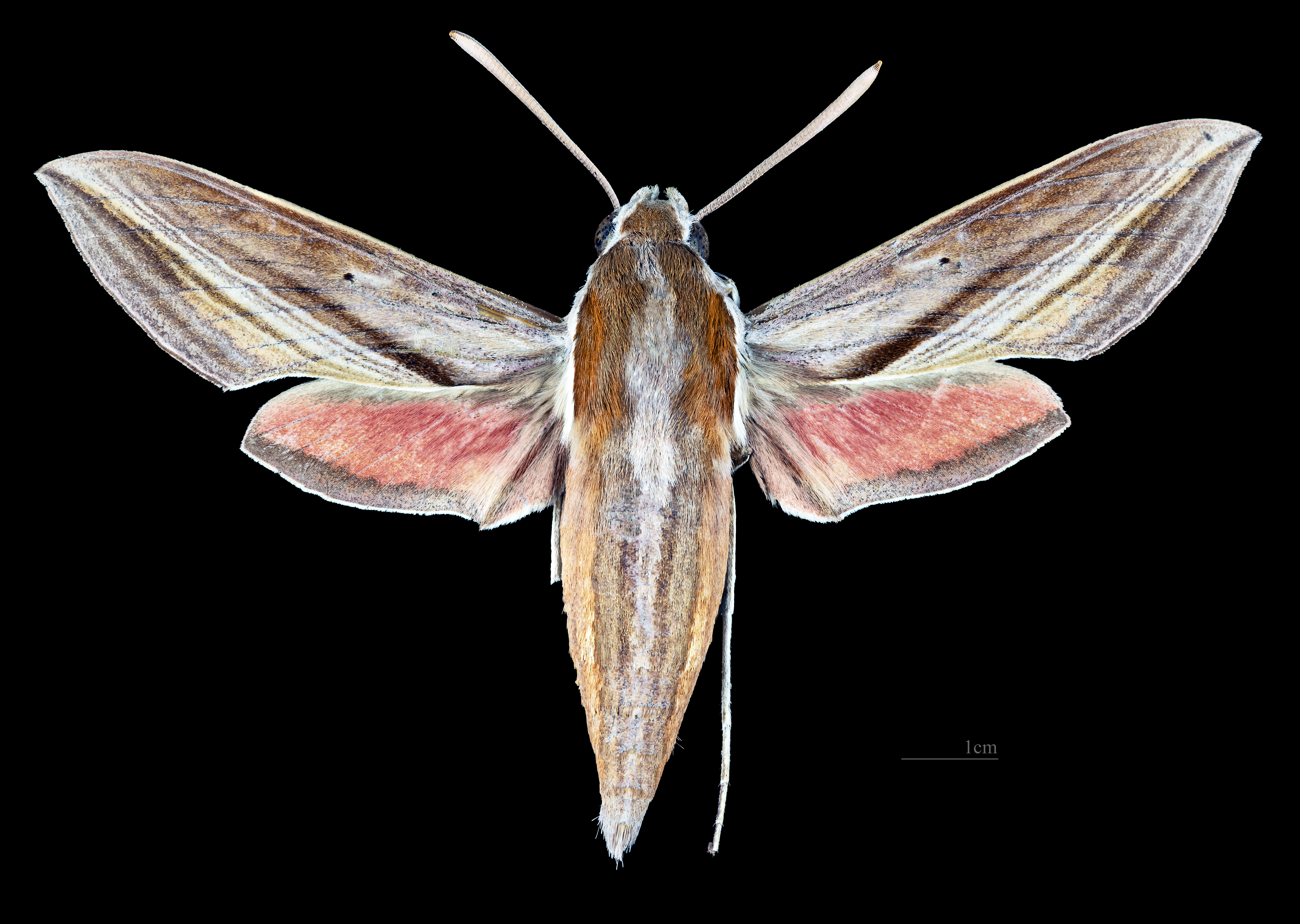
Female dorsal

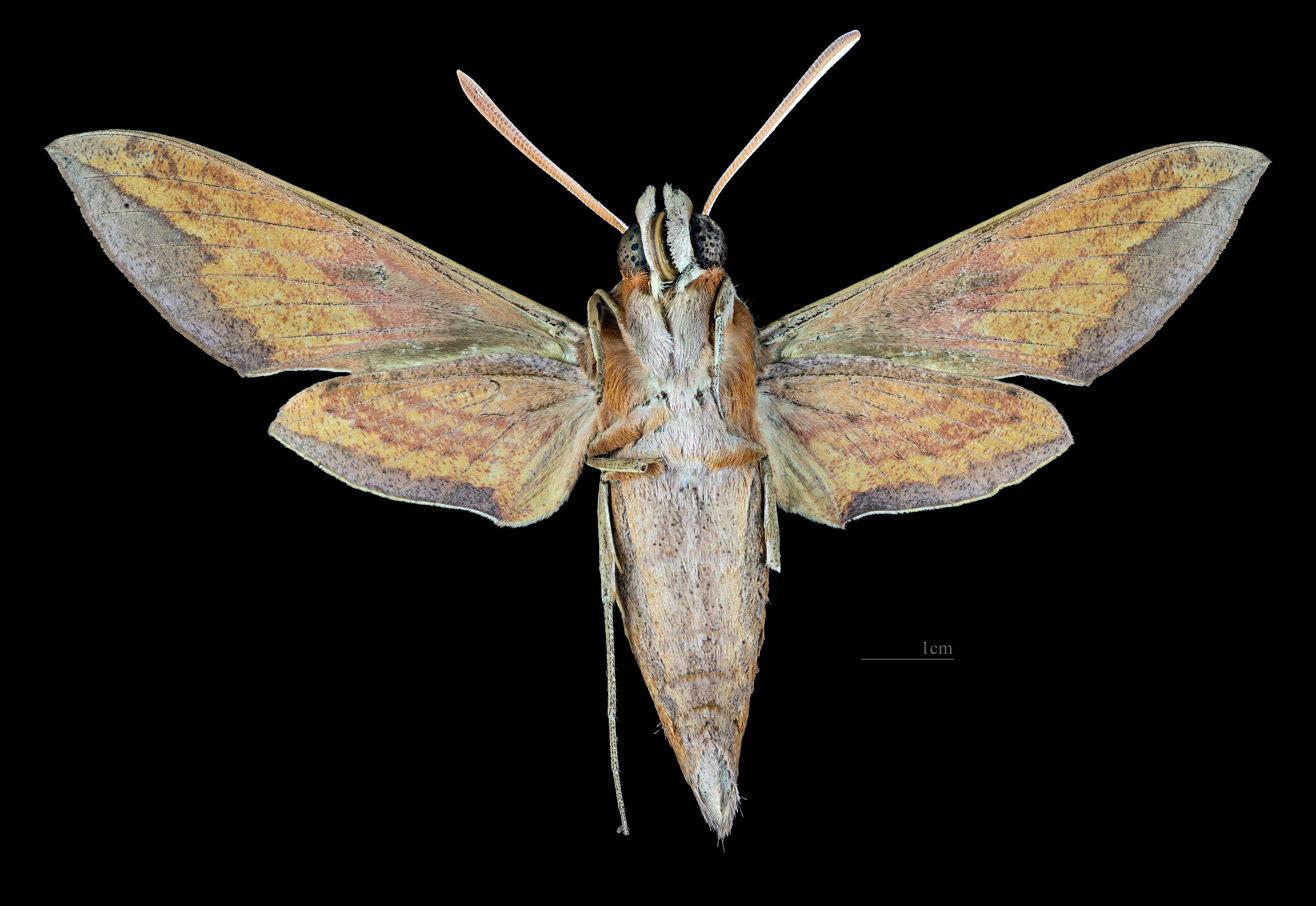
Female ventral

== Subspecies ==
- Hippotion rafflesii rafflesii
- Hippotion rafflesii dyokeae Hogenes & Treadaway, 1998 (Philippines)
