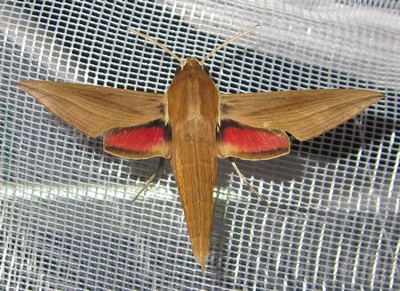

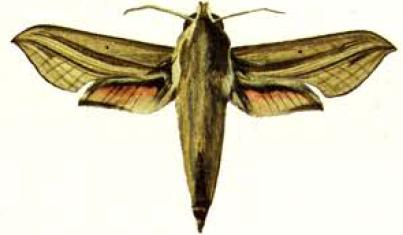

Scientific classification
- Kingdom: Animalia
- Phylum: Arthropoda
- Class: Insecta
- Order: Lepidoptera
- Family: Sphingidae
- Genus: Hippotion
- Species: H. eson

Binomial name
- Hippotion eson (Cramer, 1779)

Synonyms
- Sphinx eson Cramer, 1779

= Hippotion eson =

Species of moth

Hippotion eson is a moth of the family Sphingidae. It is very common in most habitats throughout the Ethiopian Region, including Madagascar and the Seychelles. It is a migratory species.
