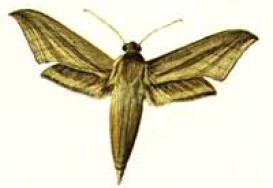

Scientific classification
- Kingdom: Animalia
- Phylum: Arthropoda
- Class: Insecta
- Order: Lepidoptera
- Family: Sphingidae
- Genus: Hippotion
- Species: H. balsaminae

Binomial name
- Hippotion balsaminae (Walker, 1856)

Synonyms
- Chaerocampa balsaminae Walker, 1856; Sphinx pinastrina Butler, 1876

= Hippotion balsaminae =

Species of moth

Hippotion balsaminae is a moth of the family Sphingidae. It is common in most habitats throughout the Ethiopian Region, including Madagascar.

The larvae feed on the leaves of Jussieua repens.
