= Hippotion leucocephalus =

Scientific classification
- Kingdom: Animalia
- Phylum: Arthropoda
- Class: Insecta
- Order: Lepidoptera
- Family: Sphingidae
- Genus: Hippotion
- Species: H. leucocephalus

Binomial name
- Hippotion leucocephalus Rober, 1929

Species of moth

Hippotion leucocephalus is a moth of the family Sphingidae.
