= Macaduma samoensis =

Scientific classification
- Domain: Eukaryota
- Kingdom: Animalia
- Phylum: Arthropoda
- Class: Insecta
- Order: Lepidoptera
- Superfamily: Noctuoidea
- Family: Erebidae
- Subfamily: Arctiinae
- Genus: Macaduma
- Species: M. samoensis

Binomial name
- Macaduma samoensis Tams, 1935

Species of moth

Macaduma samoensis is a moth of the subfamily Arctiinae. It was described by Willie Horace Thomas Tams in 1935. It is found on Samoa.
