= Dracaenura adela =

Scientific classification
- Domain: Eukaryota
- Kingdom: Animalia
- Phylum: Arthropoda
- Class: Insecta
- Order: Lepidoptera
- Family: Crambidae
- Genus: Dracaenura
- Species: D. adela

Binomial name
- Dracaenura adela Tams, 1935

Species of moth

Dracaenura adela is a moth in the family Crambidae. It was described by Willie Horace Thomas Tams in 1935. It is found on Samoa.
