= Authaeretis exaereta =

Scientific classification
- Domain: Eukaryota
- Kingdom: Animalia
- Phylum: Arthropoda
- Class: Insecta
- Order: Lepidoptera
- Family: Crambidae
- Genus: Authaeretis
- Species: A. exaereta

Binomial name
- Authaeretis exaereta Tams, 1935

Species of moth

Authaeretis exaereta is a moth in the family Crambidae. It was described by Willie Horace Thomas Tams in 1935. It is found on Samoa.
