= Neoduma =

Scientific classification
- Kingdom: Animalia
- Phylum: Arthropoda
- Class: Insecta
- Order: Lepidoptera
- Superfamily: Noctuoidea
- Family: Erebidae
- Subfamily: Arctiinae
- Tribe: Lithosiini
- Genus: Neoduma; Hampson, 1918

Genus of moths

Neoduma is a genus of moths in the subfamily Arctiinae. The genus was erected by George Hampson in 1918.

== Species ==
- Neoduma alexeikorshunovi Dubatolov & Bucsek, 2013 Thailand
- Neoduma caprimimoides Rothschild, 1912
- Neoduma cretacea (Hampson, 1914) Formosa
- Neoduma ectozona Hampson, 1918 Philippines (Luzon), Borneo
- Neoduma kuangtungensis (Daniel, 1951) China (Kwantung, Chekiang)
- Neoduma nigra Bucsek, 2012 Malay Peninsula
- Neoduma plagosus Rothschild, 1912
- Neoduma simplex Pagenstecher, 1900
- Neoduma songensis Dubatolov & Bucsek, 2016 northern Vietnam
- Neoduma valvata Kirti, Joshi & Singh, 2014 Assam
