= Exeristis asynopta =

Scientific classification
- Domain: Eukaryota
- Kingdom: Animalia
- Phylum: Arthropoda
- Class: Insecta
- Order: Lepidoptera
- Family: Crambidae
- Genus: Exeristis
- Species: E. asynopta

Binomial name
- Exeristis asynopta Tams, 1935

Species of moth

Exeristis asynopta is a moth in the family Crambidae. It was described by Willie Horace Thomas Tams in 1935. It is found on Samoa.
