= Perisyntrocha =

Scientific classification
- Kingdom: Animalia
- Phylum: Arthropoda
- Class: Insecta
- Order: Lepidoptera
- Family: Crambidae
- Subfamily: Spilomelinae
- Genus: Perisyntrocha; Meyrick, 1894

Genus of moths

Perisyntrocha is a genus of moths of the family Crambidae.

== Species ==
- Perisyntrocha alienalis
- Perisyntrocha anialis
- Perisyntrocha ossealis
- Perisyntrocha suffusa

== Former species ==
- Perisyntrocha affinis
- Perisyntrocha circumdatalis
- Perisyntrocha cuneolalis
- Perisyntrocha flavalis
- Perisyntrocha picata
