= Bradina agraphalis =

Scientific classification
- Kingdom: Animalia
- Phylum: Arthropoda
- Class: Insecta
- Order: Lepidoptera
- Family: Crambidae
- Genus: Bradina
- Species: B. agraphalis

Binomial name
- Bradina agraphalis (Guenée, 1854)

Synonyms
- Stenia agraphalis Guenée, 1854

Species of moth

Bradina agraphalis is a moth in the family Crambidae. It was described by Achille Guenée in 1854. It is found in Brazil.
