= Perisyntrocha alienalis =

Scientific classification
- Kingdom: Animalia
- Phylum: Arthropoda
- Class: Insecta
- Order: Lepidoptera
- Family: Crambidae
- Genus: Perisyntrocha
- Species: P. alienalis

Binomial name
- Perisyntrocha alienalis (Walker, 1866)

Synonyms
- Zebronia alienalis Walker, 1866

Species of moth

Perisyntrocha alienalis is a moth in the family Crambidae. It is found in Indonesia (Sulawesi) and New Guinea.
