= Neoduma plagosus =

Scientific classification
- Domain: Eukaryota
- Kingdom: Animalia
- Phylum: Arthropoda
- Class: Insecta
- Order: Lepidoptera
- Superfamily: Noctuoidea
- Family: Erebidae
- Subfamily: Arctiinae
- Genus: Neoduma
- Species: N. plagosus

Binomial name
- Neoduma plagosus (Rothschild, 1912)

Synonyms
- Padenodes plagosus Rothschild, 1912

Species of moth

Neoduma plagosus is a moth of the subfamily Arctiinae. It was described by Rothschild in 1912. It is found in New Guinea.

The length of the forewings 10 mm. The forewings are creamy white with a yellow costa. The basal half of the wings is edged with black and there are two olive-grey antemedian patches as well as one on the termen. The hindwings are buff.
