= Bradina aurata =

Scientific classification
- Domain: Eukaryota
- Kingdom: Animalia
- Phylum: Arthropoda
- Class: Insecta
- Order: Lepidoptera
- Family: Crambidae
- Genus: Bradina
- Species: B. aurata

Binomial name
- Bradina aurata (Butler, 1887)

Synonyms
- Pleonectusa aurata Butler, 1887

Species of moth

Bradina aurata is a moth in the family Crambidae. It has a wing length of 8mm and is mostly pale-yellowish. It was described by Arthur Gardiner Butler in 1887. It is found on the Solomon Islands and West-Malaysia.
