= Bradina macaralis =

Scientific classification
- Domain: Eukaryota
- Kingdom: Animalia
- Phylum: Arthropoda
- Class: Insecta
- Order: Lepidoptera
- Family: Crambidae
- Genus: Bradina
- Species: B. macaralis

Binomial name
- Bradina macaralis (Walker, 1859)

Synonyms
- Botys macaralis Walker, 1859

Species of moth

Bradina macaralis is a moth in the family Crambidae. It was described by Francis Walker in 1859. It is found on Borneo, Java, the Solomon Islands and Madagascar.
