= Bradina megesalis =

Scientific classification
- Domain: Eukaryota
- Kingdom: Animalia
- Phylum: Arthropoda
- Class: Insecta
- Order: Lepidoptera
- Family: Crambidae
- Genus: Bradina
- Species: B. megesalis

Binomial name
- Bradina megesalis (Walker, 1859)

Synonyms
- Botys megesalis Walker, 1859

Species of moth

Bradina megesalis is a moth in the family Crambidae. It was described by Francis Walker in 1859. It is found in northern China.
