= Bradina plagalis =

Scientific classification
- Domain: Eukaryota
- Kingdom: Animalia
- Phylum: Arthropoda
- Class: Insecta
- Order: Lepidoptera
- Family: Crambidae
- Genus: Bradina
- Species: B. plagalis

Binomial name
- Bradina plagalis (Moore, 1867)

Synonyms
- Botys plagalis Moore, 1867

Species of moth

Bradina plagalis is a moth in the family Crambidae. It was described by Frederic Moore in 1867. It is found in Darjeeling, India.
