= Bradina extenuatalis =

Scientific classification
- Kingdom: Animalia
- Phylum: Arthropoda
- Class: Insecta
- Order: Lepidoptera
- Family: Crambidae
- Genus: Bradina
- Species: B. extenuatalis

Binomial name
- Bradina extenuatalis (Walker, 1865)

Synonyms
- Botys extenuatalis Walker, 1865; Dracaenura plebejifascialis Rothschild, 1915

Species of moth

Bradina extenuatalis is a moth in the family Crambidae. It was described by Francis Walker in 1865. It is found on the Sula Islands and in Papua New Guinea.
