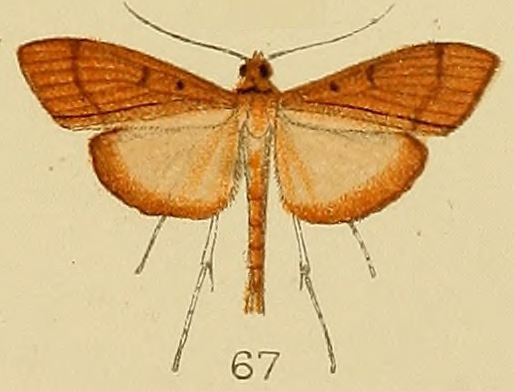
- Dracaenura torridalis

Scientific classification
- Domain: Eukaryota
- Kingdom: Animalia
- Phylum: Arthropoda
- Class: Insecta
- Order: Lepidoptera
- Family: Crambidae
- Subfamily: Spilomelinae
- Genus: Dracaenura; Meyrick, 1886

= Dracaenura =

Genus of moths

Dracaenura is a genus of moths of the family Crambidae. It was described by Edward Meyrick in 18863.

== Species ==
- Dracaenura adela Tams, 1935
- Dracaenura aegialitis Meyrick, 1910
- Dracaenura agramma Meyrick, 1886
- Dracaenura albonigralis Hampson, 1897
- Dracaenura arfakalis Swinhoe, 1918
- Dracaenura asthenota Meyrick, 1886
- Dracaenura chrysochroa Hampson, 1907
- Dracaenura cincticorpus Hampson, 1897
- Dracaenura horochroa Meyrick, 1886
- Dracaenura leucoprocta Hampson, 1897
- Dracaenura myota Meyrick, 1886
- Dracaenura pelochra Meyrick, 1886
- Dracaenura prosthenialis Hampson, 1897
- Dracaenura pseudopelochra Rothschild, 1915
- Dracaenura semialbalis Rothschild, 1915
- Dracaenura stenosoma (C. Felder, R. Felder & Rogenhofer, 1875)
- Dracaenura tagiadialis Hampson, 1897
- Dracaenura torridalis Kenrick, 1907
