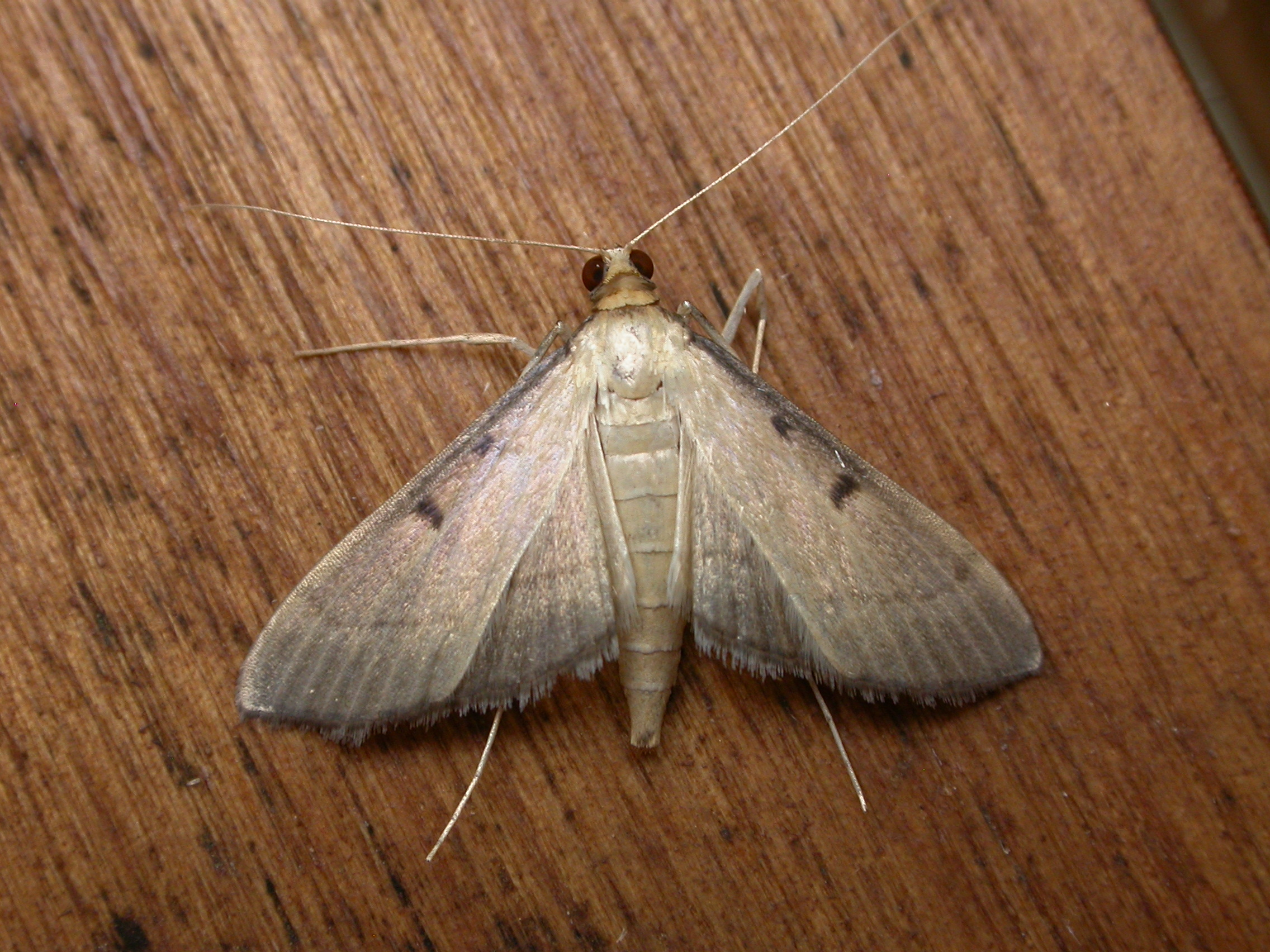
- Bradina admixtalis

Scientific classification
- Kingdom: Animalia
- Phylum: Arthropoda
- Clade: Pancrustacea
- Class: Insecta
- Order: Lepidoptera
- Family: Crambidae
- Subfamily: Spilomelinae
- Genus: Bradina; Lederer, 1863

Type species
- Bradina impressalis (Lederer, 1863)

Synonyms
- Erilita Lederer, 1863; Pleonectusa Lederer, 1863; Trematarcha Meyrick, 1886

= Bradina =

Genus of moths

Bradina is a genus of moths of the family Crambidae.

== Species ==
- Bradina aaronalis Schaus, 1924
- Bradina adhaesalis (Walker, 1859)
- Bradina admixtalis (Walker, 1859)
- Bradina agraphalis (Guenée, 1854)
- Bradina albigenitalis Hampson, 1917
- Bradina angusta (Butler, 1882)
- Bradina angustalis Yamanaka, 1984
- Bradina antenoralis (Walker, 1859)
- Bradina argentata (Butler, 1887)
- Bradina atralis (Pagenstecher, 1907)
- Bradina atopalis (Walker, 1858)
- Bradina aulacodialis Strand, 1919
- Bradina aurata (Butler, 1887)
- Bradina aureolalis de Joannis, 1899
- Bradina bicoloralis Hampson, 1896
- Bradina carterotoxa Meyrick, 1932
- Bradina cauvinalis Legrand, 1966
- Bradina ceramica Rothschild, 1915
- Bradina chalcophaea Meyrick, 1932
- Bradina chalinota (Meyrick, 1886)
- Bradina chlorionalis Tams, 1935
- Bradina chloroscia (Meyrick, 1886)
- Bradina cirrhophanes Meyrick, 1932
- Bradina costalis Hampson, 1907
- Bradina dentalis Hampson, 1907
- Bradina desumptalis (Walker, 1866)
- Bradina diagonalis (Guenée, 1854)
- Bradina emphasis J. F. G. Clarke, 1986
- Bradina eremica J. F. G. Clarke, 1986
- Bradina erilitalis (C. Felder, R. Felder & Rogenhofer, 1875)
- Bradina erilitoides Strand, 1919
- Bradina eucentra (Meyrick, 1937)
- Bradina extenuatalis (Walker, 1865)
- Bradina falciculata Guo & Du, 2023
- Bradina fidelia J. F. G. Clarke, 1986
- Bradina finbaralis Schaus, 1924
- Bradina flavalis (Hampson, 1917)
- Bradina fusoidea Guo & Du, 2023
- Bradina geminalis Caradja, 1927
- Bradina glaucinalis Hampson, 1907
- Bradina haplomorpha Meyrick, 1932
- Bradina hemmingalis
- Bradina impressalis Lederer, 1863
- Bradina intermedialis Caradja, 1932
- Bradina itysalis Viette, 1957
- Bradina leopoldi Ghesquière, 1942
- Bradina leptolopha Tams, 1935
- Bradina leucura Hampson, 1897
- Bradina liodesalis (Walker, 1859)
- Bradina macaralis (Walker, 1859)
- Bradina mannusalis (Walker, 1859)
- Bradina megesalis (Walker, 1859)
- Bradina melanoperas Hampson, 1896
- Bradina metaleucalis Walker, 1865
- Bradina miantodes Meyrick, 1932
- Bradina modestalis (Lederer, 1863)
- Bradina neuralis Hampson, 1907
- Bradina nigripunctalis South in Leech & South, 1901
- Bradina opacusalis Swinhoe, 1904
- Bradina paeonialis (Druce, 1902)
- Bradina parallela (Meyrick, 1886)
- Bradina parbattoides Tams, 1935
- Bradina perlucidalis Hampson, 1897
- Bradina pionealis Snellen, 1890
- Bradina plagalis (Moore, 1867)
- Bradina planalis (Swinhoe, 1894)
- Bradina postbicoloralis Rothschild, 1915
- Bradina pumilialis Hampson, 1907
- Bradina punctilinealis Hampson, 1907
- Bradina purpurascens Hampson, 1907
- Bradina pycnolopha Tams, 1935
- Bradina rectilinealis South in Leech & South, 1901
- Bradina remipes Hampson, 1897
- Bradina selectalis Lederer, 1863
- Bradina semnopa (Meyrick, 1886)
- Bradina sordidalis (Dewitz, 1881)
- Bradina spirella Guo & Du, 2023
- Bradina stigmophanes Meyrick, 1932
- Bradina stricta J. F. G. Clarke, 1986
- Bradina subpurpurescens (Warren, 1896)
- Bradina ternifolia Guo & Du, 2023
- Bradina tormentifera Meyrick, 1929
- Bradina torsiva Guo & Du, 2023
- Bradina translinealis Hampson, 1896
- Bradina trigonalis Yamanaka, 1984
- Bradina trispila (Meyrick, 1886)
- Bradina xanthalis Hampson, 1917
