= Bradina eucentra =

Scientific classification
- Kingdom: Animalia
- Phylum: Arthropoda
- Class: Insecta
- Order: Lepidoptera
- Family: Crambidae
- Genus: Bradina
- Species: B. eucentra

Binomial name
- Bradina eucentra (Meyrick, 1937)

Synonyms
- Aulacoptera eucentra Meyrick, 1937

Species of moth

Bradina eucentra is a moth in the family Crambidae. It was described by Edward Meyrick in 1937. It is found in the Democratic Republic of the Congo.
