= Dracaenura leucoprocta =

Scientific classification
- Kingdom: Animalia
- Phylum: Arthropoda
- Class: Insecta
- Order: Lepidoptera
- Family: Crambidae
- Genus: Dracaenura
- Species: D. leucoprocta

Binomial name
- Dracaenura leucoprocta Hampson, 1897

Species of moth

Dracaenura leucoprocta is a moth in the family Crambidae. It was described by George Hampson in 1897. It is found on Vanuatu in the South Pacific Ocean.
