= Bradina bicoloralis =

Scientific classification
- Kingdom: Animalia
- Phylum: Arthropoda
- Class: Insecta
- Order: Lepidoptera
- Family: Crambidae
- Genus: Bradina
- Species: B. bicoloralis

Binomial name
- Bradina bicoloralis Hampson, 1896

Species of moth

Bradina bicoloralis is a moth in the family Crambidae. It was described by George Hampson in 1896. It is found in Myanmar.
