= Macaduma albisparsa =

Scientific classification
- Kingdom: Animalia
- Phylum: Arthropoda
- Class: Insecta
- Order: Lepidoptera
- Superfamily: Noctuoidea
- Family: Erebidae
- Subfamily: Arctiinae
- Genus: Macaduma
- Species: M. albisparsa

Binomial name
- Macaduma albisparsa Hampson, 1914

Synonyms
- Macaduma albisparsa ab. kurandana Strand, 1922

Species of moth

Macaduma albisparsa is a moth of the subfamily Arctiinae. It was described by George Hampson in 1914. It is found on New Guinea.
