= Bradina aaronalis =

Scientific classification
- Domain: Eukaryota
- Kingdom: Animalia
- Phylum: Arthropoda
- Class: Insecta
- Order: Lepidoptera
- Family: Crambidae
- Genus: Bradina
- Species: B. aaronalis

Binomial name
- Bradina aaronalis Schaus, 1924

Species of moth

Bradina aaronalis is a moth in the family Crambidae. It is found in Guatemala and in Costa Rica.
