= Bradina translinealis =

Scientific classification
- Kingdom: Animalia
- Phylum: Arthropoda
- Class: Insecta
- Order: Lepidoptera
- Family: Crambidae
- Genus: Bradina
- Species: B. translinealis

Binomial name
- Bradina translinealis Hampson, 1896

Species of moth

Bradina translinealis is a moth in the family Crambidae. It was described by George Hampson in 1896. It is found in the north-western Himalayas.
