= Bradina dentalis =

Scientific classification
- Domain: Eukaryota
- Kingdom: Animalia
- Phylum: Arthropoda
- Class: Insecta
- Order: Lepidoptera
- Family: Crambidae
- Genus: Bradina
- Species: B. dentalis

Binomial name
- Bradina dentalis Hampson, 1907

Species of moth

Bradina dentalis is a moth in the family Crambidae. It was described by George Hampson in 1907. It is found on Selaru in Indonesia.
