= Macaduma costimacula =

Scientific classification
- Domain: Eukaryota
- Kingdom: Animalia
- Phylum: Arthropoda
- Class: Insecta
- Order: Lepidoptera
- Superfamily: Noctuoidea
- Family: Erebidae
- Subfamily: Arctiinae
- Genus: Macaduma
- Species: M. costimacula

Binomial name
- Macaduma costimacula Bethune-Baker, 1908

Species of moth

Macaduma costimacula is a moth of the subfamily Arctiinae. It was described by George Thomas Bethune-Baker in 1908. It is found in New Guinea.
