= Macaduma rufoumbrata =

Scientific classification
- Domain: Eukaryota
- Kingdom: Animalia
- Phylum: Arthropoda
- Class: Insecta
- Order: Lepidoptera
- Superfamily: Noctuoidea
- Family: Erebidae
- Subfamily: Arctiinae
- Genus: Macaduma
- Species: M. rufoumbrata

Binomial name
- Macaduma rufoumbrata Rothschild, 1912

Synonyms
- Macaduma indistincta Rothschild, 1912; Macaduma rufoumbrata ab. indistinctilinea Strand, 1922; Macaduma rufoumbrata ab. irrorella Strand, 1922; Macaduma rufoumbrata ab. medioumbra Strand, 1922

Species of moth

Macaduma rufoumbrata is a moth of the subfamily Arctiinae. It was described by Rothschild in 1912. It is found on New Guinea.
