= Macaduma albata =

Scientific classification
- Kingdom: Animalia
- Phylum: Arthropoda
- Class: Insecta
- Order: Lepidoptera
- Superfamily: Noctuoidea
- Family: Erebidae
- Subfamily: Arctiinae
- Genus: Macaduma
- Species: M. albata

Binomial name
- Macaduma albata Hampson, 1900

Synonyms
- Macaduma sordidescens Rothschild, 1916; Eurosia albida Rothschild, 1913; Neoduma albida

Species of moth

Macaduma albata is a moth of the subfamily Arctiinae. It was described by George Hampson in 1900. It is found on New Guinea.
