= Macaduma feliscaudata =

Scientific classification
- Domain: Eukaryota
- Kingdom: Animalia
- Phylum: Arthropoda
- Class: Insecta
- Order: Lepidoptera
- Superfamily: Noctuoidea
- Family: Erebidae
- Subfamily: Arctiinae
- Genus: Macaduma
- Species: M. feliscaudata

Binomial name
- Macaduma feliscaudata D. S. Fletcher, 1957

Species of moth

Macaduma feliscaudata is a moth of the subfamily Arctiinae. It was described by David Stephen Fletcher in 1957. It is found on Rennell Island.
