= Bradina neuralis =

Scientific classification
- Domain: Eukaryota
- Kingdom: Animalia
- Phylum: Arthropoda
- Class: Insecta
- Order: Lepidoptera
- Family: Crambidae
- Genus: Bradina
- Species: B. neuralis

Binomial name
- Bradina neuralis Hampson, 1907

Species of moth

Bradina neuralis is a moth in the family Crambidae. It was described by George Hampson in 1907. It is found on Samoa.
