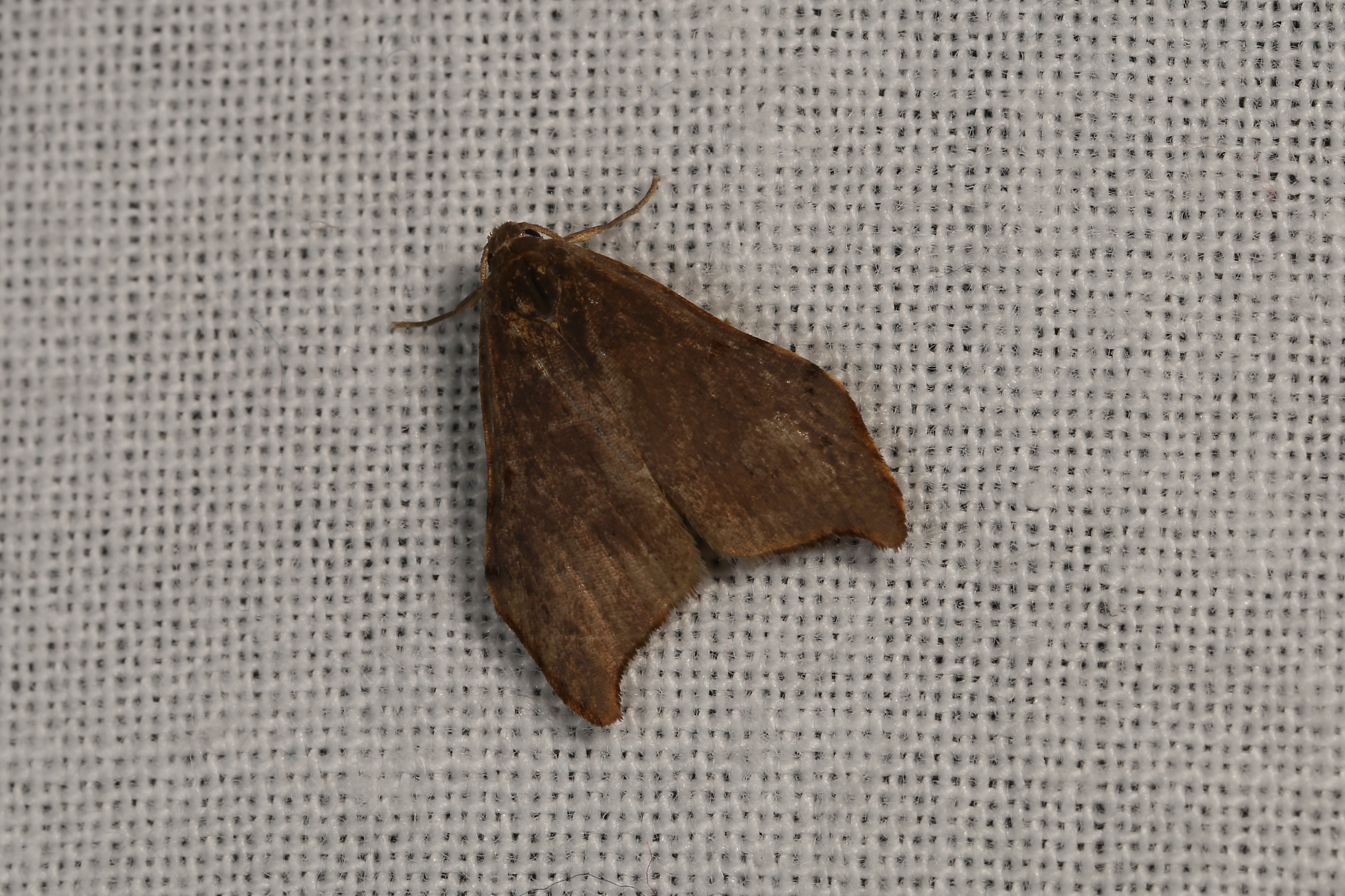

Scientific classification
- Domain: Eukaryota
- Kingdom: Animalia
- Phylum: Arthropoda
- Class: Insecta
- Order: Lepidoptera
- Superfamily: Noctuoidea
- Family: Erebidae
- Subfamily: Arctiinae
- Genus: Macaduma
- Species: M. strongyla

Binomial name
- Macaduma strongyla Turner, 1922

Synonyms
- Macaduma kurandana Strand, 1922

= Macaduma strongyla =

Species of moth

Macaduma strongyla is a moth of the subfamily Arctiinae. It was described by Alfred Jefferis Turner in 1922. It is found in Australia, where it has been recorded from Queensland and New South Wales.

The wingspan is about 30 mm. The forewings grey brown and the hindwings are brown.
