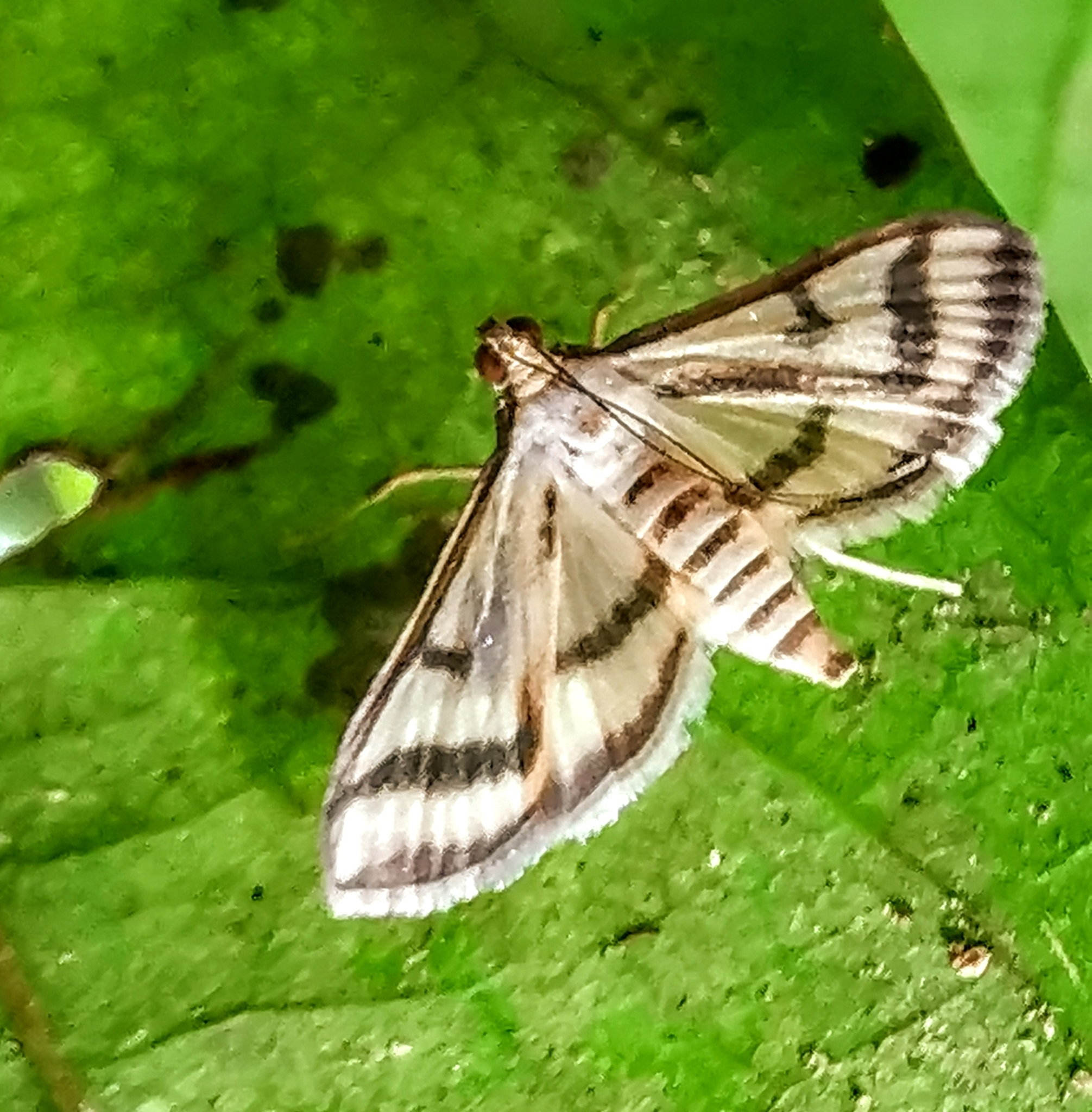
- Perisyntrocha anialis

Scientific classification
- Kingdom: Animalia
- Phylum: Arthropoda
- Class: Insecta
- Order: Lepidoptera
- Family: Crambidae
- Genus: Perisyntrocha
- Species: P. anialis

Binomial name
- Perisyntrocha anialis (Walker, 1859)

Synonyms
- Botys anialis Walker, 1859; Stegothyris picata Butler, 1882; Botys circumdatalis Walker, [1866]; Parapoynx cuneolalis Snellen, 1880

= Perisyntrocha anialis =

Species of moth

Perisyntrocha anialis is a moth in the family Crambidae. It is found in Indonesia (Borneo) and Papua New Guinea.
