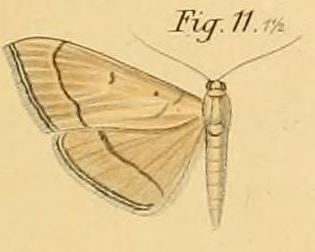

Scientific classification
- Domain: Eukaryota
- Kingdom: Animalia
- Phylum: Arthropoda
- Class: Insecta
- Order: Lepidoptera
- Family: Crambidae
- Genus: Bradina
- Species: B. sordidalis

Binomial name
- Bradina sordidalis (Dewitz, 1881)

Synonyms
- Botys sordidalis Dewitz, 1881

= Bradina sordidalis =

Species of moth

Bradina sordidalis is a moth in the family Crambidae. It was described by Hermann Dewitz in 1881. It is found in Cameroon, Equatorial Guinea and Nigeria.
