= Bradina erilitalis =

Scientific classification
- Domain: Eukaryota
- Kingdom: Animalia
- Phylum: Arthropoda
- Class: Insecta
- Order: Lepidoptera
- Family: Crambidae
- Genus: Bradina
- Species: B. erilitalis

Binomial name
- Bradina erilitalis (C. Felder, R. Felder & Rogenhofer, 1875)

Synonyms
- Marasmia erilitalis C. Felder, R. Felder & Rogenhofer, 1875

Species of moth

Bradina erilitalis is a moth in the family Crambidae. It was described by Cajetan Felder, Rudolf Felder and Alois Friedrich Rogenhofer in 1875. It is found on Fiji.
