= Bradina costalis =

Scientific classification
- Domain: Eukaryota
- Kingdom: Animalia
- Phylum: Arthropoda
- Class: Insecta
- Order: Lepidoptera
- Family: Crambidae
- Genus: Bradina
- Species: B. costalis

Binomial name
- Bradina costalis Hampson, 1907

Species of moth

Bradina costalis is a moth in the family Crambidae. It was described by George Hampson in 1907. It is found on the Solomon Islands.
