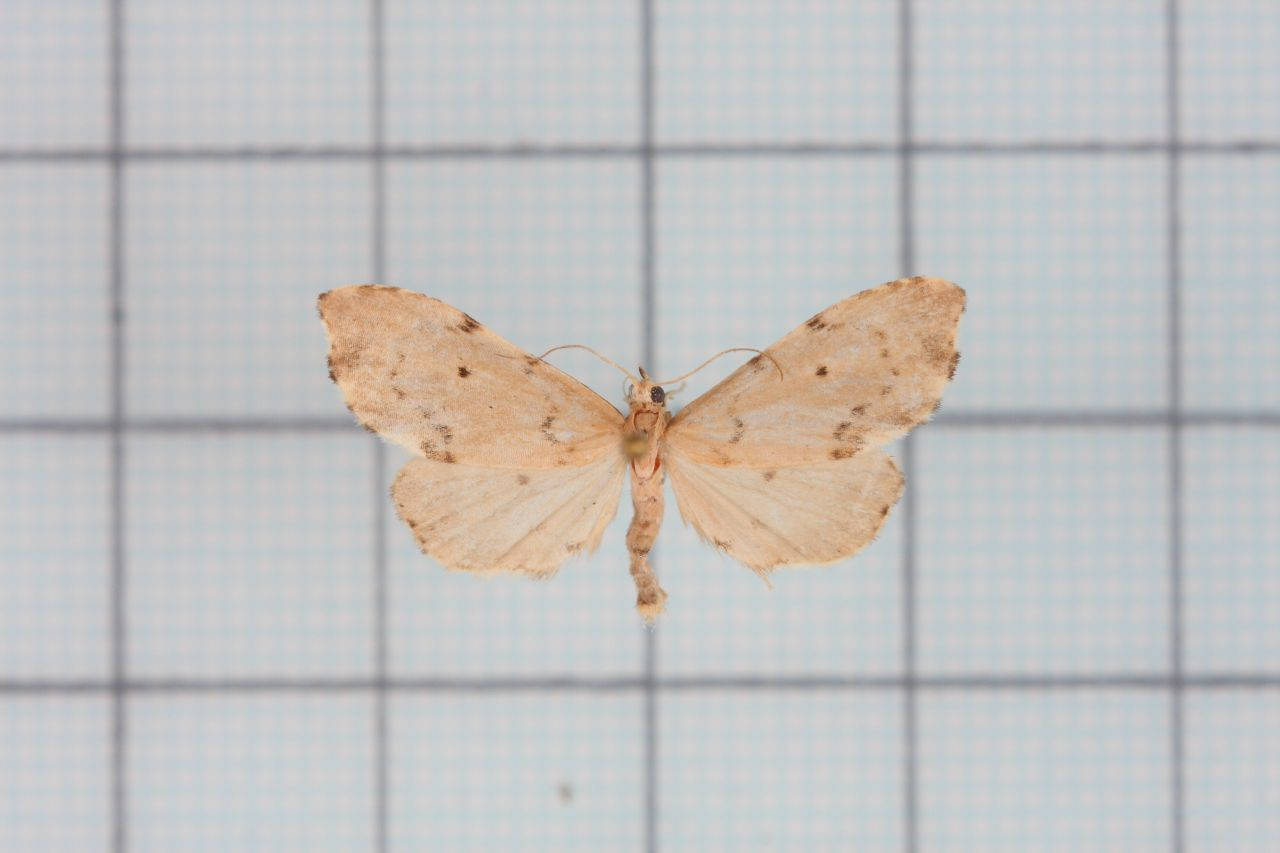
- Macaduma cretacea

Scientific classification
- Kingdom: Animalia
- Phylum: Arthropoda
- Class: Insecta
- Order: Lepidoptera
- Superfamily: Noctuoidea
- Family: Erebidae
- Subfamily: Arctiinae
- Subtribe: Cisthenina
- Genus: Macaduma; Walker, 1866

Synonyms
- Psapharacis Turner, 1899

= Macaduma =

Genus of moths

Macaduma is a genus of moths in the subfamily Arctiinae.

== Distribution ==
The genus has its greatest diversity in the Australian tropics, extending weakly east to New Caledonia, Fiji and Samoa and west to the Himalaya.

== Species ==
- Macaduma albata Hampson, 1900
- Macaduma albisparsa Hampson, 1914
- Macaduma aroa Bethune-Baker, 1904
- Macaduma biangulata Holloway, 1979
- Macaduma bipunctata Bethune-Baker, 1904
- Macaduma borneana Holloway, 2001
- Macaduma castaneofusca Rothschild, 1912
- Macaduma castneogriseata Rothschild, 1912
- Macaduma corvina (Felder, 1875)
- Macaduma costimacula (Bethune-Baker, 1908)
- Macaduma cretacea Hampson, 1914
- Macaduma cristata Holloway, 1979
- Macaduma feliscaudata D. S. Fletcher, 1957
- Macaduma foliacea Rothschild, 1912
- Macaduma fuliginosa Rothschild, 1912
- Macaduma fusca Hampson, 1900
- Macaduma lichenia Rothschild, 1912
- Macaduma macrosema Hampson, 1914
- Macaduma micans Hampson, 1900
- Macaduma montana Robinson, 1975
- Macaduma nigripuncta Hampson, 1900
- Macaduma pallicosta Rothschild, 1912
- Macaduma postflavida Rothschild, 1916
- Macaduma quercifolia Rothschild, 1912
- Macaduma recurva Rothschild, 1915
- Macaduma reducta Rothschild, 1912
- Macaduma rufa Hampson, 1914
- Macaduma rufoumbrata Rothschild, 1912
- Macaduma samoensis Tams, 1935
- Macaduma striata Robinson, 1975
- Macaduma strongyla Turner, 1922
- Macaduma subfoliacea Rothschild, 1916
- Macaduma suffusa (Rothschild, 1913)
- Macaduma tortricella Walker, 1866
- Macaduma tortricoides Rothschild, 1912
- Macaduma toxophora (Turner, 1899)
