= Bradina finbaralis =

Scientific classification
- Domain: Eukaryota
- Kingdom: Animalia
- Phylum: Arthropoda
- Class: Insecta
- Order: Lepidoptera
- Family: Crambidae
- Genus: Bradina
- Species: B. finbaralis

Binomial name
- Bradina finbaralis Schaus, 1924

Species of moth

Bradina finbaralis is a moth in the family Crambidae. It was described by Schaus in 1924. It is found in Mexico.
