= Macaduma striata =

Scientific classification
- Domain: Eukaryota
- Kingdom: Animalia
- Phylum: Arthropoda
- Class: Insecta
- Order: Lepidoptera
- Superfamily: Noctuoidea
- Family: Erebidae
- Subfamily: Arctiinae
- Genus: Macaduma
- Species: M. striata

Binomial name
- Macaduma striata Robinson, 1975

Species of moth

Macaduma striata is a moth of the subfamily Arctiinae. It was described by Robinson in 1975. It is found on Fiji.
