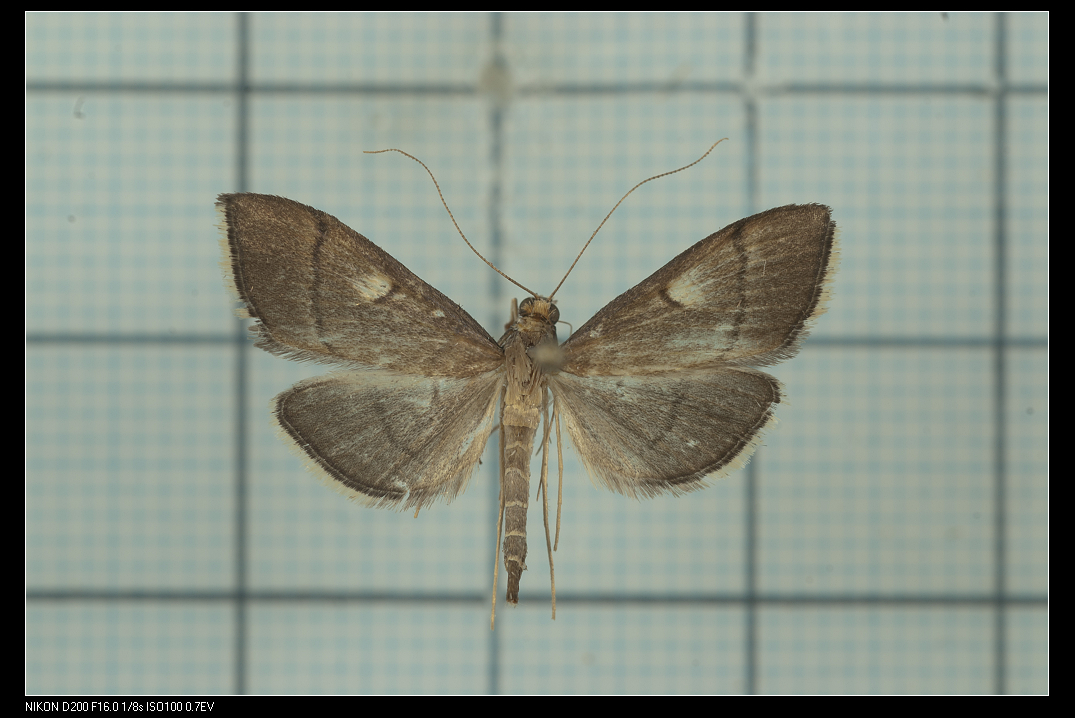

Scientific classification
- Domain: Eukaryota
- Kingdom: Animalia
- Phylum: Arthropoda
- Class: Insecta
- Order: Lepidoptera
- Family: Crambidae
- Genus: Bradina
- Species: B. aulacodialis

Binomial name
- Bradina aulacodialis Strand, 1919

= Bradina aulacodialis =

Species of moth

Bradina aulacodialis is a species of moth in the family Crambidae first described by Embrik Strand in 1919. It is found in Taiwan.
