= Dracaenura horochroa =

Scientific classification
- Kingdom: Animalia
- Phylum: Arthropoda
- Class: Insecta
- Order: Lepidoptera
- Family: Crambidae
- Genus: Dracaenura
- Species: D. horochroa

Binomial name
- Dracaenura horochroa Meyrick, 1886

Species of moth

Dracaenura horochroa is a moth in the family Crambidae. It is found in New Guinea.
