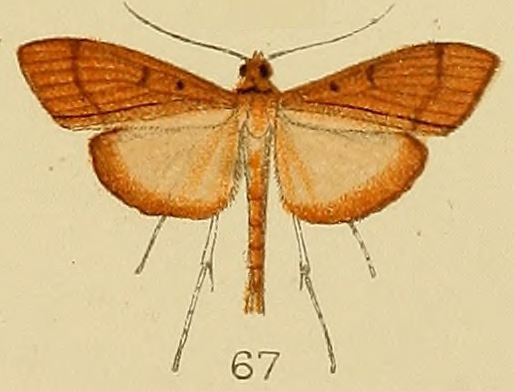

Scientific classification
- Domain: Eukaryota
- Kingdom: Animalia
- Phylum: Arthropoda
- Class: Insecta
- Order: Lepidoptera
- Family: Crambidae
- Genus: Dracaenura
- Species: D. torridalis

Binomial name
- Dracaenura torridalis Kenrick, 1907

= Dracaenura torridalis =

Species of moth

Dracaenura torridalis is a species of moth of the family Crambidae. It was described by George Hamilton Kenrick in 1907 and it is found in Papua New Guinea.

It has a wingspan of 33 mm.
