= Bradina chloroscia =

Scientific classification
- Domain: Eukaryota
- Kingdom: Animalia
- Phylum: Arthropoda
- Class: Insecta
- Order: Lepidoptera
- Family: Crambidae
- Genus: Bradina
- Species: B. chloroscia

Binomial name
- Bradina chloroscia (Meyrick, 1886)

Synonyms
- Pleonectusa chloroscia Meyrick, 1886

Species of moth

Bradina chloroscia is a moth in the family Crambidae. It was described by Edward Meyrick in 1886. It is found on Tonga.
