= Bradina opacusalis =

Scientific classification
- Domain: Eukaryota
- Kingdom: Animalia
- Phylum: Arthropoda
- Class: Insecta
- Order: Lepidoptera
- Family: Crambidae
- Genus: Bradina
- Species: B. opacusalis

Binomial name
- Bradina opacusalis C. Swinhoe, 1904

Species of moth

Bradina opacusalis is a moth in the family Crambidae. It was described by Charles Swinhoe in 1904. It can be found on Borneo.
