= Macaduma corvina =

Scientific classification
- Domain: Eukaryota
- Kingdom: Animalia
- Phylum: Arthropoda
- Class: Insecta
- Order: Lepidoptera
- Superfamily: Noctuoidea
- Family: Erebidae
- Subfamily: Arctiinae
- Genus: Macaduma
- Species: M. corvina

Binomial name
- Macaduma corvina (Felder, 1875)

Synonyms
- Cisthene corvina Felder, 1875

Species of moth

Macaduma corvina is a moth of the subfamily Arctiinae. It was described by Felder in 1875. It is found on Fiji.
