= Bradina itysalis =

Scientific classification
- Domain: Eukaryota
- Kingdom: Animalia
- Phylum: Arthropoda
- Class: Insecta
- Order: Lepidoptera
- Family: Crambidae
- Genus: Bradina
- Species: B. itysalis

Binomial name
- Bradina itysalis Viette, 1957

Species of moth

Bradina itysalis is a moth species in the family Crambidae. It was described by Pierre Viette in 1957. It is found on Príncipe island, São Tomé and Príncipe.
