= Bradina cauvinalis =

Scientific classification
- Domain: Eukaryota
- Kingdom: Animalia
- Phylum: Arthropoda
- Class: Insecta
- Order: Lepidoptera
- Family: Crambidae
- Genus: Bradina
- Species: B. cauvinalis

Binomial name
- Bradina cauvinalis Legrand, 1966

Species of moth

Bradina cauvinalis is a moth in the family Crambidae. It was described by Henry Legrand in 1966. It is found on the Seychelles, where it has been recorded from Mahé.
