= Bradina pionealis =

Scientific classification
- Kingdom: Animalia
- Phylum: Arthropoda
- Class: Insecta
- Order: Lepidoptera
- Family: Crambidae
- Genus: Bradina
- Species: B. pionealis

Binomial name
- Bradina pionealis Snellen, 1890

Species of moth

Bradina pionealis is a moth in the family Crambidae. It was described by Snellen in 1890. It is found in India (Sikkim).
