= Bradina perlucidalis =

Scientific classification
- Kingdom: Animalia
- Phylum: Arthropoda
- Class: Insecta
- Order: Lepidoptera
- Family: Crambidae
- Genus: Bradina
- Species: B. perlucidalis

Binomial name
- Bradina perlucidalis Hampson, 1897

Species of moth

Bradina perlucidalis is a moth in the family Crambidae. It was described by George Hampson in 1897. It is found on the Marquesas Islands.
