= Bradina argentata =

Scientific classification
- Domain: Eukaryota
- Kingdom: Animalia
- Phylum: Arthropoda
- Class: Insecta
- Order: Lepidoptera
- Family: Crambidae
- Genus: Bradina
- Species: B. argentata

Binomial name
- Bradina argentata (Butler, 1887)

Synonyms
- Pleonectusa argentata Butler, 1887

Species of moth

Bradina argentata is a moth in the family Crambidae. It was described by Arthur Gardiner Butler in 1887. It is found on the Solomon Islands.
