= Bradina trigonalis =

Scientific classification
- Domain: Eukaryota
- Kingdom: Animalia
- Phylum: Arthropoda
- Class: Insecta
- Order: Lepidoptera
- Family: Crambidae
- Genus: Bradina
- Species: B. trigonalis

Binomial name
- Bradina trigonalis Yamanaka, 1984

Species of moth

Bradina trigonalis is a moth in the family Crambidae. It was described by Hiroshi Yamanaka in 1984. It is found in Japan.
