= Dracaenura albonigralis =

Scientific classification
- Kingdom: Animalia
- Phylum: Arthropoda
- Class: Insecta
- Order: Lepidoptera
- Family: Crambidae
- Genus: Dracaenura
- Species: D. albonigralis

Binomial name
- Dracaenura albonigralis Hampson, 1897

Species of moth

Dracaenura albonigralis is a moth in the family Crambidae. It was described by George Hampson in 1897. It is found in New Guinea.
