= Bradina intermedialis =

Scientific classification
- Domain: Eukaryota
- Kingdom: Animalia
- Phylum: Arthropoda
- Class: Insecta
- Order: Lepidoptera
- Family: Crambidae
- Genus: Bradina
- Species: B. intermedialis

Binomial name
- Bradina intermedialis Caradja, 1932

Species of moth

Bradina intermedialis is a moth in the family Crambidae. It was described by Aristide Caradja in 1932. It is found on China.
