= Bradina planalis =

Scientific classification
- Domain: Eukaryota
- Kingdom: Animalia
- Phylum: Arthropoda
- Class: Insecta
- Order: Lepidoptera
- Family: Crambidae
- Genus: Bradina
- Species: B. planalis

Binomial name
- Bradina planalis (C. Swinhoe, 1894)

Synonyms
- Pleonectusa planalis C. Swinhoe, 1894

Species of moth

Bradina planalis is a moth in the family Crambidae. It was described by Charles Swinhoe in 1894. It is found in the Indian state of Meghalaya. The type locality was Cherrapunji.
