= Exeristis asyphela =

Scientific classification
- Kingdom: Animalia
- Phylum: Arthropoda
- Class: Insecta
- Order: Lepidoptera
- Family: Crambidae
- Genus: Exeristis
- Species: E. asyphela

Binomial name
- Exeristis asyphela Meyrick, 1886

Species of moth

Exeristis asyphela is a moth in the family Crambidae. It was described by Edward Meyrick in 1886. It is found in Tonga.
