= Bradina leopoldi =

Scientific classification
- Kingdom: Animalia
- Phylum: Arthropoda
- Clade: Pancrustacea
- Class: Insecta
- Order: Lepidoptera
- Family: Crambidae
- Genus: Bradina
- Species: B. leopoldi

Binomial name
- Bradina leopoldi Ghesquière, 1942

Species of moth

Bradina leopoldi is a moth in the family Crambidae. It was described by Jean Ghesquière in 1942. It is found in the Democratic Republic of the Congo.
