= Bradina desumptalis =

Scientific classification
- Kingdom: Animalia
- Phylum: Arthropoda
- Class: Insecta
- Order: Lepidoptera
- Family: Crambidae
- Genus: Bradina
- Species: B. desumptalis

Binomial name
- Bradina desumptalis (Walker, 1866)

Synonyms
- Hydrocampa desumptalis Walker, 1866

Species of moth

Bradina desumptalis is a moth in the family Crambidae. It was described by Francis Walker in 1866. It is found in Tefé, Brazil.
