= Macaduma subfoliacea =

Scientific classification
- Domain: Eukaryota
- Kingdom: Animalia
- Phylum: Arthropoda
- Class: Insecta
- Order: Lepidoptera
- Superfamily: Noctuoidea
- Family: Erebidae
- Subfamily: Arctiinae
- Genus: Macaduma
- Species: M. subfoliacea

Binomial name
- Macaduma subfoliacea Rothschild, 1916

Species of moth

Macaduma subfoliacea is a moth of the subfamily Arctiinae. It was described by Rothschild in 1916. It is found in Volcan Island.
