= Macaduma reducta =

Scientific classification
- Domain: Eukaryota
- Kingdom: Animalia
- Phylum: Arthropoda
- Class: Insecta
- Order: Lepidoptera
- Superfamily: Noctuoidea
- Family: Erebidae
- Subfamily: Arctiinae
- Genus: Macaduma
- Species: M. reducta

Binomial name
- Macaduma reducta Rothschild, 1912

Species of moth

Macaduma reducta is a moth in the subfamily Arctiinae. It was described by Walter Rothschild in 1912. It is found on Fergusson Island in Papua New Guinea.
