= Authaeretis eridora =

Scientific classification
- Kingdom: Animalia
- Phylum: Arthropoda
- Class: Insecta
- Order: Lepidoptera
- Family: Crambidae
- Genus: Authaeretis
- Species: A. eridora

Binomial name
- Authaeretis eridora Meyrick, 1886

Species of moth

Authaeretis eridora is a moth in the family Crambidae. It was described by Edward Meyrick in 1886. It is found on Fiji.
