= Dracaenura tagiadialis =

Scientific classification
- Kingdom: Animalia
- Phylum: Arthropoda
- Class: Insecta
- Order: Lepidoptera
- Family: Crambidae
- Genus: Dracaenura
- Species: D. tagiadialis

Binomial name
- Dracaenura tagiadialis Hampson, 1897

Species of moth

Dracaenura tagiadialis is a moth in the family Crambidae. It was described by George Hampson in 1897. It is found in New Guinea, where it has been recorded from Fergusson Island.
