= Neoduma caprimimoides =

Scientific classification
- Domain: Eukaryota
- Kingdom: Animalia
- Phylum: Arthropoda
- Class: Insecta
- Order: Lepidoptera
- Superfamily: Noctuoidea
- Family: Erebidae
- Subfamily: Arctiinae
- Genus: Neoduma
- Species: N. caprimimoides

Binomial name
- Neoduma caprimimoides (Rothschild, 1912)

Synonyms
- Lambula caprimimoides Rothschild, 1912

Species of moth

Neoduma caprimimoides is a moth of the subfamily Arctiinae. It was described by Rothschild in 1912. It is found in New Guinea.

The forewings are rufous chocolate with sooty black zigzag lines and a black spot at the tornus. The hindwings are sooty mouse-grey.
