= Bradina purpurascens =

Scientific classification
- Domain: Eukaryota
- Kingdom: Animalia
- Phylum: Arthropoda
- Class: Insecta
- Order: Lepidoptera
- Family: Crambidae
- Genus: Bradina
- Species: B. purpurascens

Binomial name
- Bradina purpurascens Hampson, 1907

Species of moth

Bradina purpurascens is a moth in the family Crambidae. It was described by George Hampson in 1907. It is found on Jamaica.
