= Bradina atralis =

Scientific classification
- Domain: Eukaryota
- Kingdom: Animalia
- Phylum: Arthropoda
- Class: Insecta
- Order: Lepidoptera
- Family: Crambidae
- Genus: Bradina
- Species: B. atralis

Binomial name
- Bradina atralis (Pagenstecher, 1907)

Synonyms
- Stegothyris atralis Pagenstecher, 1907

Species of moth

Bradina atralis is a moth in the family Crambidae. It was described by Pagenstecher in 1907. It is found on the Comoros, where it has been recorded from Grande Comore and Mohéli.
