= Macaduma aroa =

Scientific classification
- Domain: Eukaryota
- Kingdom: Animalia
- Phylum: Arthropoda
- Class: Insecta
- Order: Lepidoptera
- Superfamily: Noctuoidea
- Family: Erebidae
- Subfamily: Arctiinae
- Genus: Macaduma
- Species: M. aroa

Binomial name
- Macaduma aroa Bethune-Baker, 1904

Synonyms
- Macaduma castanea Hampson, 1911

Species of moth

Macaduma aroa is a moth of the subfamily Arctiinae. It was described by George Thomas Bethune-Baker in 1904. It is found in New Guinea.
