= Authaeretis =

Scientific classification
- Domain: Eukaryota
- Kingdom: Animalia
- Phylum: Arthropoda
- Class: Insecta
- Order: Lepidoptera
- Family: Crambidae
- Subfamily: Pyraustinae
- Genus: Authaeretis; Meyrick, 1886

Synonyms
- Anthaeretis Carus, 1887

Genus of moths

Authaeretis is a genus of moths of the family Crambidae.

== Species ==
- Authaeretis eridora Meyrick, 1886
- Authaeretis exaereta Tams, 1935
