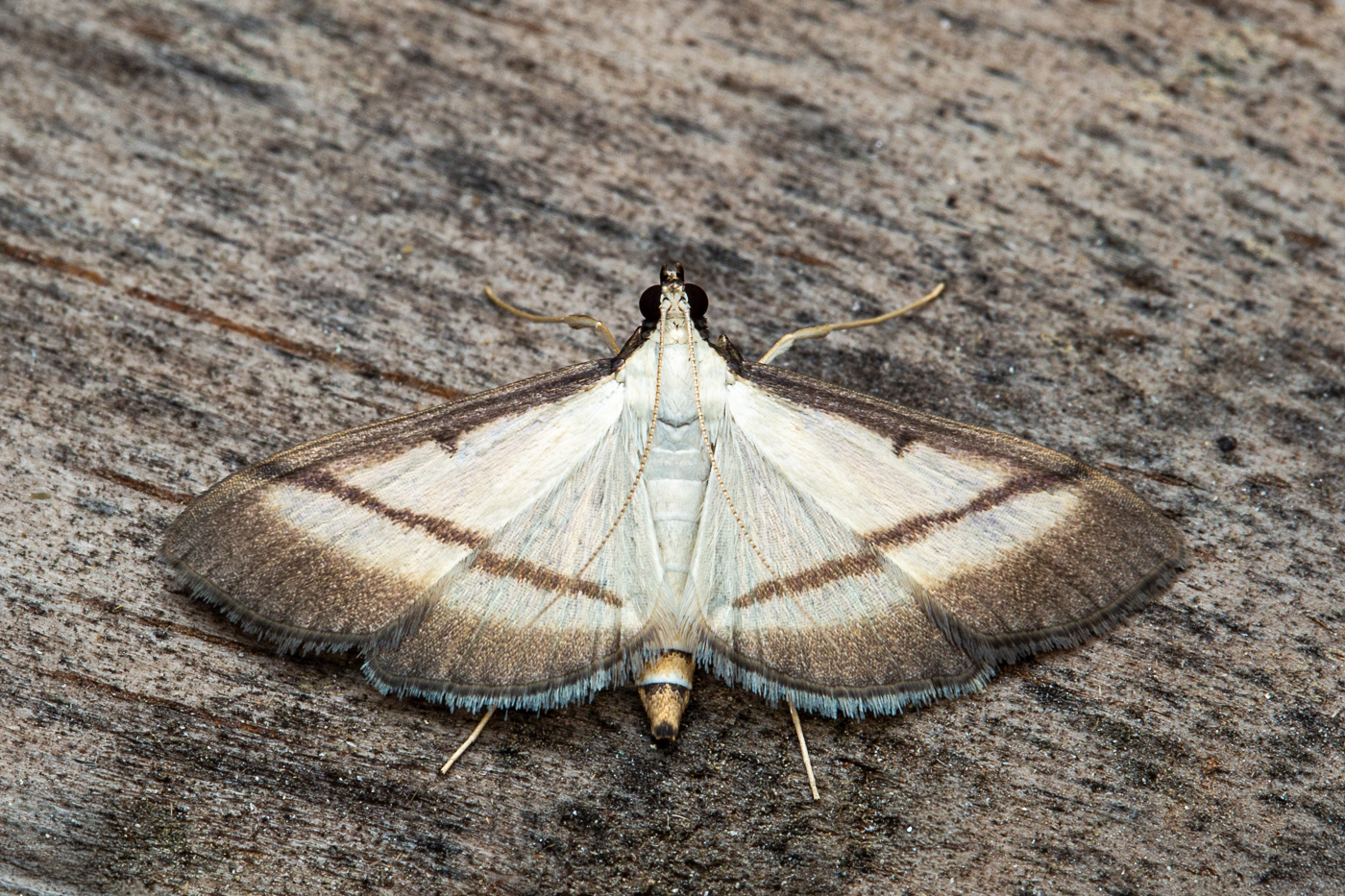

Scientific classification
- Kingdom: Animalia
- Phylum: Arthropoda
- Class: Insecta
- Order: Lepidoptera
- Family: Crambidae
- Genus: Bradina
- Species: B. diagonalis

Binomial name
- Bradina diagonalis (Guenée, 1854)

Synonyms
- Salbia diagonalis Guenée, 1854; Stegothyris transversalis Lederer, 1863

= Bradina diagonalis =

Species of moth

Bradina diagonalis is a moth of the family Crambidae described by Achille Guenée in 1854. It was described from Java, but is also found in Taiwan, China, Vietnam and Pakistan.
