= Dracaenura aegialitis =

Scientific classification
- Kingdom: Animalia
- Phylum: Arthropoda
- Class: Insecta
- Order: Lepidoptera
- Family: Crambidae
- Genus: Dracaenura
- Species: D. aegialitis

Binomial name
- Dracaenura aegialitis Meyrick, 1910

Species of moth

Dracaenura aegialitis is a moth of the family Pyralidae. It was described by Edward Meyrick in 1910. It is found in New Zealand, where it has been recorded from the Kermadec Islands.
