= Bradina stigmophanes =

Scientific classification
- Domain: Eukaryota
- Kingdom: Animalia
- Phylum: Arthropoda
- Class: Insecta
- Order: Lepidoptera
- Family: Crambidae
- Genus: Bradina
- Species: B. stigmophanes

Binomial name
- Bradina stigmophanes Meyrick, 1932

Species of moth

Bradina stigmophanes is a moth in the family Crambidae. It was described by Edward Meyrick in 1932. It is found on Fiji.
