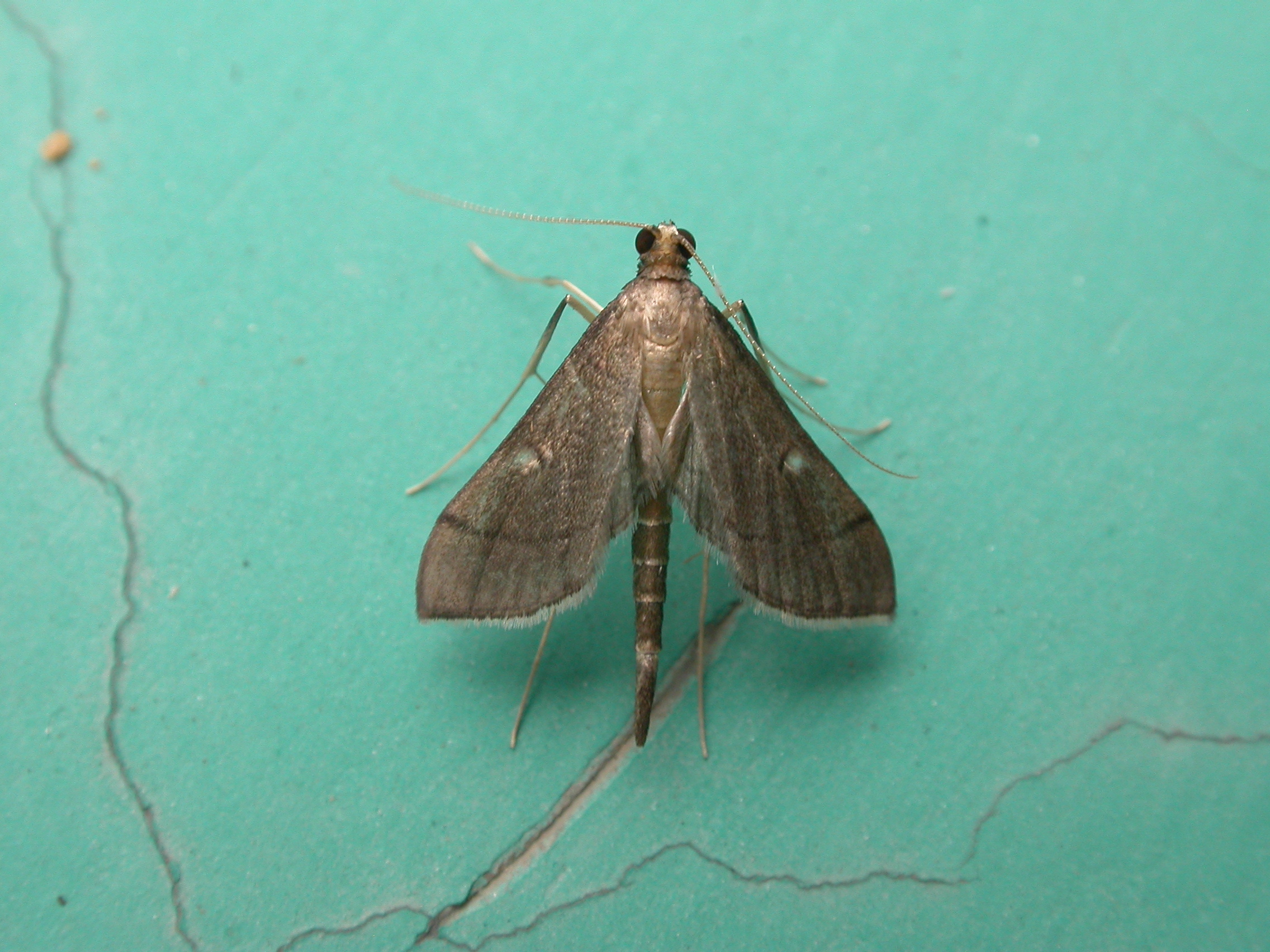

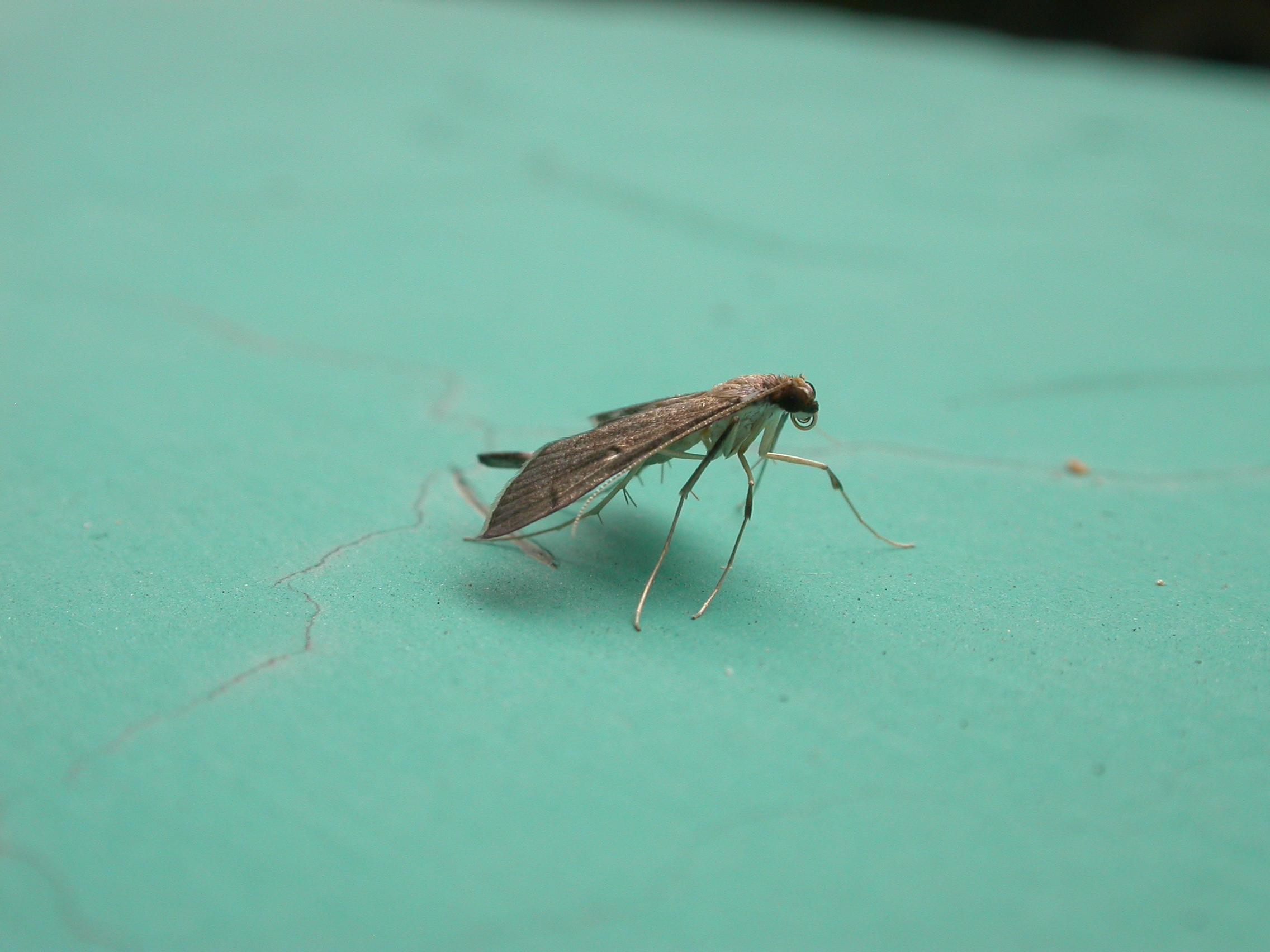

Scientific classification
- Kingdom: Animalia
- Phylum: Arthropoda
- Class: Insecta
- Order: Lepidoptera
- Family: Crambidae
- Genus: Bradina
- Species: B. atopalis

Binomial name
- Bradina atopalis (Walker, 1858)

Synonyms
- Botys atopalis Walker, 1858; Botys damasalis Walker, 1859; Bradina atopalis erectalis Yamanaka, 1984; Bradina atopalis krigeri Streltzov & Dubatolov, 2009; Bradina atopalis taiwanensis Yamanaka, 1984

= Bradina atopalis =

Species of moth

Bradina atopalis is a moth of the family Crambidae described by Francis Walker in 1858. It is found in China, Taiwan, Japan, Korea and Russia.
