= Dracaenura agramma =

Scientific classification
- Kingdom: Animalia
- Phylum: Arthropoda
- Class: Insecta
- Order: Lepidoptera
- Family: Crambidae
- Genus: Dracaenura
- Species: D. agramma

Binomial name
- Dracaenura agramma Meyrick, 1886

Synonyms
- Dracaenura dolia Tams, 1935

Species of moth

Dracaenura agramma is a moth in the family Crambidae. It is found on Samoa.
