= Bradina ceramica =

Scientific classification
- Domain: Eukaryota
- Kingdom: Animalia
- Phylum: Arthropoda
- Class: Insecta
- Order: Lepidoptera
- Family: Crambidae
- Genus: Bradina
- Species: B. ceramica

Binomial name
- Bradina ceramica Rothschild, 1915

Species of moth

Bradina ceramica is a moth in the family Crambidae. It was described by Rothschild in 1915. It is found on Seram.
