= Macaduma fusca =

Scientific classification
- Kingdom: Animalia
- Phylum: Arthropoda
- Clade: Pancrustacea
- Class: Insecta
- Order: Lepidoptera
- Superfamily: Noctuoidea
- Family: Erebidae
- Subfamily: Arctiinae
- Genus: Macaduma
- Species: M. fusca

Binomial name
- Macaduma fusca Hampson, 1900

Species of moth

Macaduma fusca is a moth of the subfamily Arctiinae. It was described by George Hampson in 1900. It is found on New Guinea.
