= Macaduma borneana =

Scientific classification
- Kingdom: Animalia
- Phylum: Arthropoda
- Clade: Pancrustacea
- Class: Insecta
- Order: Lepidoptera
- Superfamily: Noctuoidea
- Family: Erebidae
- Subfamily: Arctiinae
- Genus: Macaduma
- Species: M. borneana

Binomial name
- Macaduma borneana Holloway, 2001

Species of moth

Macaduma borneana is a moth of the subfamily Arctiinae. It was described by Jeremy Daniel Holloway in 2001. It is found on Borneo. The habitat consists of lowland areas, including disturbed and coastal habitats as well as forests.

The length of the forewings is 9–10 mm.
