= Bradina parallela =

Scientific classification
- Domain: Eukaryota
- Kingdom: Animalia
- Phylum: Arthropoda
- Class: Insecta
- Order: Lepidoptera
- Family: Crambidae
- Genus: Bradina
- Species: B. parallela

Binomial name
- Bradina parallela (Meyrick, 1886)

Synonyms
- Pleonectusa parallela Meyrick, 1886

Species of moth

Bradina parallela is a moth in the family Crambidae. It was described by Edward Meyrick in 1886. It is found on Fiji.
