= Perisyntrocha suffusa =

Scientific classification
- Kingdom: Animalia
- Phylum: Arthropoda
- Class: Insecta
- Order: Lepidoptera
- Family: Crambidae
- Genus: Perisyntrocha
- Species: P. suffusa

Binomial name
- Perisyntrocha suffusa Kenrick, 1912

Synonyms
- Bradina affinis Rothschild, 1916

Species of moth

Perisyntrocha suffusa is a moth in the family Crambidae. It is found in Indonesia (Papua).
