= Perisyntrocha ossealis =

Scientific classification
- Kingdom: Animalia
- Phylum: Arthropoda
- Class: Insecta
- Order: Lepidoptera
- Family: Crambidae
- Genus: Perisyntrocha
- Species: P. ossealis

Binomial name
- Perisyntrocha ossealis Hampson, 1896

Species of moth

Perisyntrocha ossealis is a moth in the family Crambidae. It is found in India (Sikkim, Nagas).
