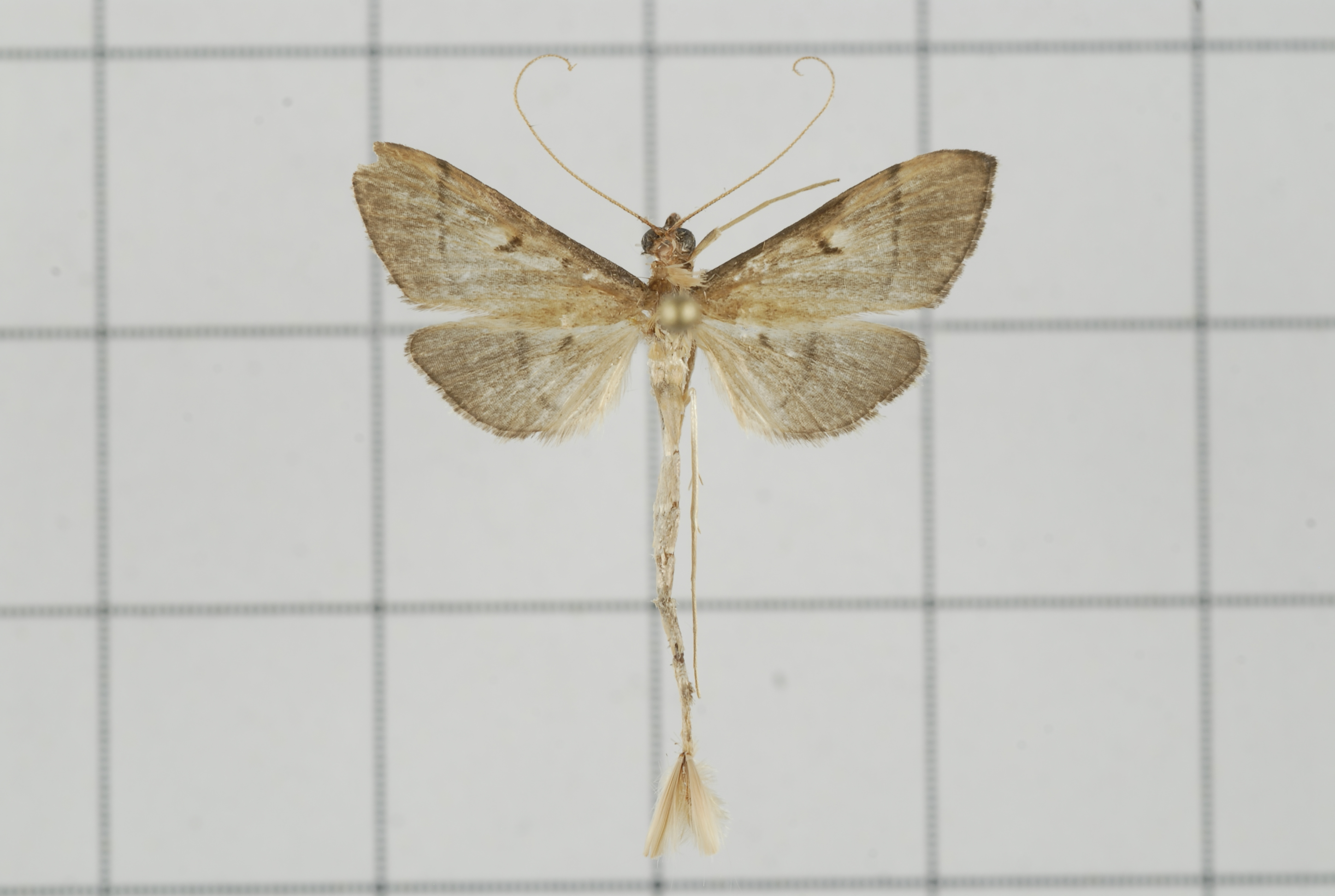

Scientific classification
- Domain: Eukaryota
- Kingdom: Animalia
- Phylum: Arthropoda
- Class: Insecta
- Order: Lepidoptera
- Family: Crambidae
- Genus: Bradina
- Species: B. geminalis

Binomial name
- Bradina geminalis Caradja, 1927

= Bradina geminalis =

Species of moth

Bradina geminalis is a moth in the family Crambidae. It was described by Aristide Caradja in 1927. It is found in China, India and Japan.
