= Macaduma cristata =

Scientific classification
- Kingdom: Animalia
- Phylum: Arthropoda
- Clade: Pancrustacea
- Class: Insecta
- Order: Lepidoptera
- Superfamily: Noctuoidea
- Family: Erebidae
- Subfamily: Arctiinae
- Genus: Macaduma
- Species: M. cristata

Binomial name
- Macaduma cristata Holloway, 1979

Species of moth

Macaduma cristata is a moth of the subfamily Arctiinae described by Jeremy Daniel Holloway in 1979. It is found in New Caledonia.
