= Bradina erilitoides =

Scientific classification
- Domain: Eukaryota
- Kingdom: Animalia
- Phylum: Arthropoda
- Class: Insecta
- Order: Lepidoptera
- Family: Crambidae
- Genus: Bradina
- Species: B. erilitoides

Binomial name
- Bradina erilitoides Strand, 1919

Species of moth

Bradina erilitoides is a moth in the family Crambidae. It was described by Strand in 1919. It is found in Taiwan and Japan.
