= Exeristis =

Scientific classification
- Domain: Eukaryota
- Kingdom: Animalia
- Phylum: Arthropoda
- Class: Insecta
- Order: Lepidoptera
- Family: Crambidae
- Subfamily: Pyraustinae
- Genus: Exeristis; Meyrick, 1886

Genus of moths

Exeristis is a genus of moths of the family Crambidae.

== Species ==
- Exeristis asynopta Tams, 1935
- Exeristis asyphela Meyrick, 1886
- Exeristis catharia Tams, 1935
- Exeristis xanthota Meyrick, 1886
