= Bradina melanoperas =

Scientific classification
- Kingdom: Animalia
- Phylum: Arthropoda
- Class: Insecta
- Order: Lepidoptera
- Family: Crambidae
- Genus: Bradina
- Species: B. melanoperas

Binomial name
- Bradina melanoperas Hampson, 1896

Species of moth

Bradina melanoperas is a moth in the family Crambidae. It was described by George Hampson in 1896. It is found in Myanmar.
