= Macaduma tortricella =

Scientific classification
- Kingdom: Animalia
- Phylum: Arthropoda
- Class: Insecta
- Order: Lepidoptera
- Superfamily: Noctuoidea
- Family: Erebidae
- Subfamily: Arctiinae
- Genus: Macaduma
- Species: M. tortricella

Binomial name
- Macaduma tortricella Walker, 1866

Species of moth

Macaduma tortricella is a moth of the subfamily Arctiinae. It was described by Francis Walker in 1866. It is found on Java and in Assam, India and New Guinea.
