= Bradina hemmingalis =

Scientific classification
- Domain: Eukaryota
- Kingdom: Animalia
- Phylum: Arthropoda
- Class: Insecta
- Order: Lepidoptera
- Family: Crambidae
- Genus: Bradina
- Species: B. hemmingalis

Binomial name
- Bradina hemmingalis Schaus, 1924

Species of moth

Bradina hemmingalis is a moth in the family Crambidae. It is found in the West Indies.
