= Dracaenura arfakalis =

Scientific classification
- Domain: Eukaryota
- Kingdom: Animalia
- Phylum: Arthropoda
- Class: Insecta
- Order: Lepidoptera
- Family: Crambidae
- Genus: Dracaenura
- Species: D. arfakalis

Binomial name
- Dracaenura arfakalis C. Swinhoe, 1918

Species of moth

Dracaenura arfakalis is a moth in the family Crambidae. It was described by Charles Swinhoe in 1918. It is found on New Guinea.
