= Bradina subpurpurescens =

Scientific classification
- Domain: Eukaryota
- Kingdom: Animalia
- Phylum: Arthropoda
- Class: Insecta
- Order: Lepidoptera
- Family: Crambidae
- Genus: Bradina
- Species: B. subpurpurescens

Binomial name
- Bradina subpurpurescens (Warren, 1896)

Synonyms
- Pleonectusa subpurpurescens Warren, 1896

Species of moth

Bradina subpurpurescens is a moth in the family Crambidae. It was described by Warren in 1896. It is found in India, where it has been recorded from the Khasi Hills.
