= Exeristis catharia =

Scientific classification
- Domain: Eukaryota
- Kingdom: Animalia
- Phylum: Arthropoda
- Class: Insecta
- Order: Lepidoptera
- Family: Crambidae
- Genus: Exeristis
- Species: E. catharia

Binomial name
- Exeristis catharia Tams, 1935

Species of moth

Exeristis catharia is a moth in the family Crambidae. It was described by Tams in 1935 and is found on Samoa.
