= Exeristis xanthota =

Scientific classification
- Kingdom: Animalia
- Phylum: Arthropoda
- Class: Insecta
- Order: Lepidoptera
- Family: Crambidae
- Genus: Exeristis
- Species: E. xanthota

Binomial name
- Exeristis xanthota Meyrick, 1886

Species of moth

Exeristis xanthota is a moth in the family Crambidae. It got described by Edward Meyrick in 1886. It is found in Fiji.
