= Bradina chalinota =

Scientific classification
- Domain: Eukaryota
- Kingdom: Animalia
- Phylum: Arthropoda
- Class: Insecta
- Order: Lepidoptera
- Family: Crambidae
- Genus: Bradina
- Species: B. chalinota

Binomial name
- Bradina chalinota (Meyrick, 1886)

Synonyms
- Pleonectusa chalinota Meyrick, 1886

Species of moth

Bradina chalinota is a moth in the family Crambidae. It was described by Edward Meyrick in 1886. It is found on the Solomon Islands.
