= Bradina impressalis =

Scientific classification
- Domain: Eukaryota
- Kingdom: Animalia
- Phylum: Arthropoda
- Class: Insecta
- Order: Lepidoptera
- Family: Crambidae
- Genus: Bradina
- Species: B. impressalis

Binomial name
- Bradina impressalis Lederer, 1863

Species of moth

Bradina impressalis is a moth in the family Crambidae. It was described by Julius Lederer in 1863. It is found in Indonesia on Ambon Island.
