= Bradina modestalis =

Scientific classification
- Domain: Eukaryota
- Kingdom: Animalia
- Phylum: Arthropoda
- Class: Insecta
- Order: Lepidoptera
- Family: Crambidae
- Genus: Bradina
- Species: B. modestalis

Binomial name
- Bradina modestalis (Lederer, 1863)

Synonyms
- Erilita modestalis Lederer, 1863

Species of moth

Bradina modestalis is a moth in the family Crambidae. It was described by Julius Lederer in 1863. It is found on Ambon Island.
