= Dracaenura chrysochroa =

Scientific classification
- Kingdom: Animalia
- Phylum: Arthropoda
- Class: Insecta
- Order: Lepidoptera
- Family: Crambidae
- Genus: Dracaenura
- Species: D. chrysochroa

Binomial name
- Dracaenura chrysochroa Hampson, 1907

Species of moth

Dracaenura chrysochroa is a moth in the family Crambidae. It was described by George Hampson in 1907. It is found in New Guinea.
