= Bradina metaleucalis =

Scientific classification
- Kingdom: Animalia
- Phylum: Arthropoda
- Class: Insecta
- Order: Lepidoptera
- Family: Crambidae
- Genus: Bradina
- Species: B. metaleucalis

Binomial name
- Bradina metaleucalis Walker, 1865

Species of moth

Bradina metaleucalis is a moth in the family Crambidae. It was described by Francis Walker in 1865. It is found on Fiji.
