= Macaduma pallicosta =

Scientific classification
- Domain: Eukaryota
- Kingdom: Animalia
- Phylum: Arthropoda
- Class: Insecta
- Order: Lepidoptera
- Superfamily: Noctuoidea
- Family: Erebidae
- Subfamily: Arctiinae
- Genus: Macaduma
- Species: M. pallicosta

Binomial name
- Macaduma pallicosta Rothschild, 1912

Synonyms
- Nacaduma toxophora nigricans Aurivillius, 1920

Species of moth

Macaduma pallicosta is a moth of the subfamily Arctiinae. It was described by Rothschild in 1912. It is found in Australia, where it has been recorded from Queensland.
