= Bradina paeonialis =

Scientific classification
- Domain: Eukaryota
- Kingdom: Animalia
- Phylum: Arthropoda
- Class: Insecta
- Order: Lepidoptera
- Family: Crambidae
- Genus: Bradina
- Species: B. paeonialis

Binomial name
- Bradina paeonialis (H. Druce, 1902)

Synonyms
- Spilomela paeonialis H. Druce, 1902

Species of moth

Bradina paeonialis is a moth in the family Crambidae. It was described by Herbert Druce in 1902. It is found in Colombia.
