= Macaduma tortricoides =

Scientific classification
- Domain: Eukaryota
- Kingdom: Animalia
- Phylum: Arthropoda
- Class: Insecta
- Order: Lepidoptera
- Superfamily: Noctuoidea
- Family: Erebidae
- Subfamily: Arctiinae
- Genus: Macaduma
- Species: M. tortricoides

Binomial name
- Macaduma tortricoides Rothschild, 1912

Species of moth

Macaduma tortricoides is a moth of the subfamily Arctiinae. It was described by Rothschild in 1912. It is found on New Guinea.
