= Bradina xanthalis =

Scientific classification
- Kingdom: Animalia
- Phylum: Arthropoda
- Class: Insecta
- Order: Lepidoptera
- Family: Crambidae
- Genus: Bradina
- Species: B. xanthalis

Binomial name
- Bradina xanthalis Hampson, 1917

Species of moth

Bradina xanthalis is a moth in the family Crambidae. It was described by George Hampson in 1917. It is found in Papua New Guinea, where it has been recorded from the Louisiade Islands.
