= Bradina tormentifera =

Scientific classification
- Kingdom: Animalia
- Phylum: Arthropoda
- Class: Insecta
- Order: Lepidoptera
- Family: Crambidae
- Genus: Bradina
- Species: B. tormentifera

Binomial name
- Bradina tormentifera Meyrick, 1929

Species of moth

Bradina tormentifera is a moth in the family Crambidae. It was described by Edward Meyrick in 1929. It is found on the Marquesas Islands in the southern Pacific Ocean.
