= Bradina eremica =

Scientific classification
- Domain: Eukaryota
- Kingdom: Animalia
- Phylum: Arthropoda
- Class: Insecta
- Order: Lepidoptera
- Family: Crambidae
- Genus: Bradina
- Species: B. eremica

Binomial name
- Bradina eremica J. F. G. Clarke, 1986

Species of moth

Bradina eremica is a moth in the family Crambidae. It was described by John Frederick Gates Clarke in 1986. It is found on the Marquesas Islands in French Polynesia.
