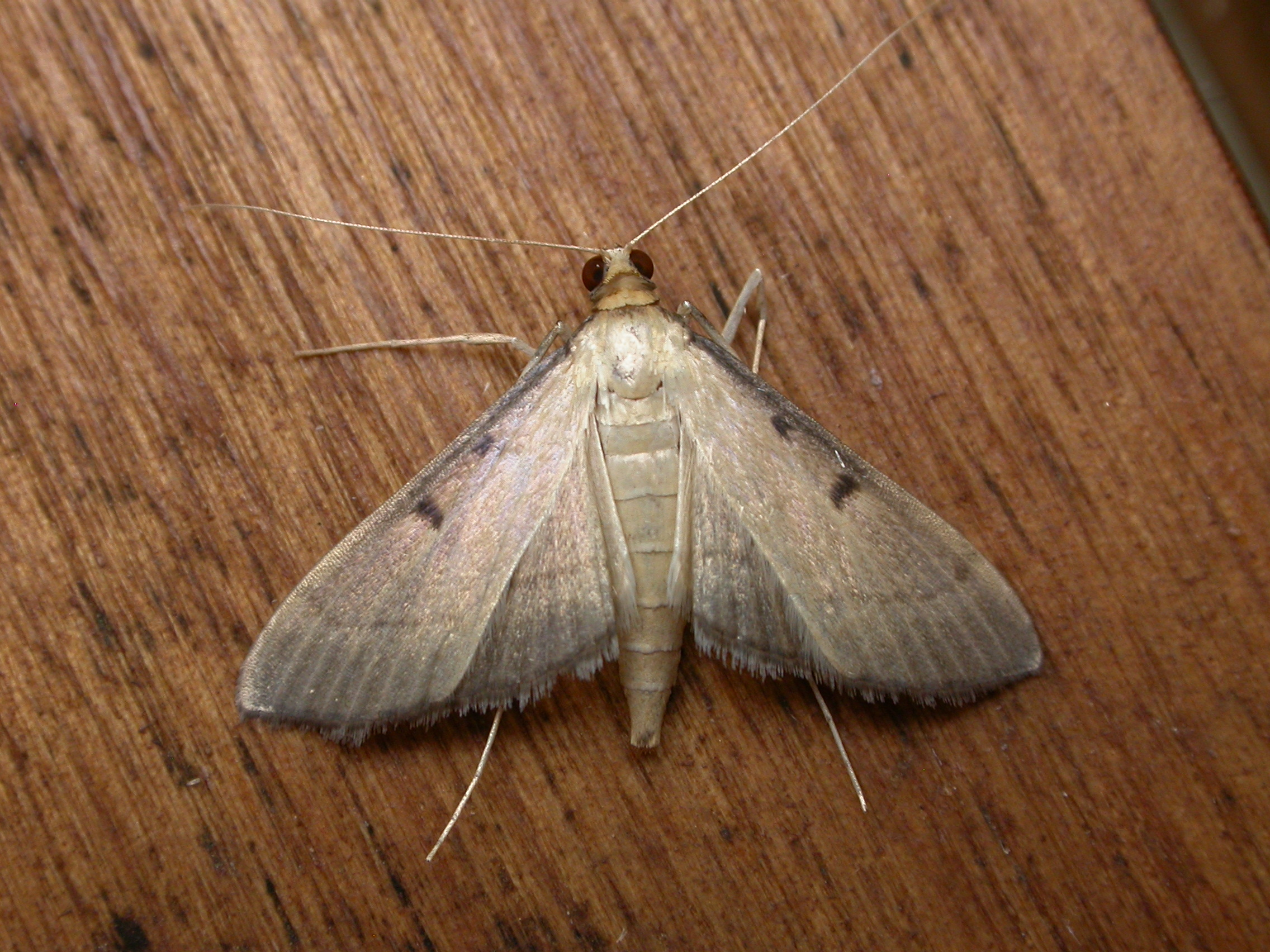

Scientific classification
- Kingdom: Animalia
- Phylum: Arthropoda
- Clade: Pancrustacea
- Class: Insecta
- Order: Lepidoptera
- Family: Crambidae
- Genus: Bradina
- Species: B. admixtalis

Binomial name
- Bradina admixtalis (Walker, 1859)

Synonyms
- Botys admixtalis Walker, 1859; Botys leptogastralis Walker, 1866; Botys panaeusalis Walker, 1859; Pleonectusa tabidalis Lederer, 1863; Pleonectusa sodalis Lederer, 1863; Botys leptogastralis Walker, [1866]; Spoladea avunculalis Saalmüller, 1880; Pleonectusa pallidalis Warren, 1896

= Bradina admixtalis =

Species of moth

Bradina admixtalis is a species of moth of the family Crambidae described by Francis Walker in 1859. It is found in Australia (Victoria, New South Wales and Queensland), New Guinea, New Zealand, south-east Asia and the Comoros, Réunion, South Africa as well as India.

The larvae feed on grasses.
