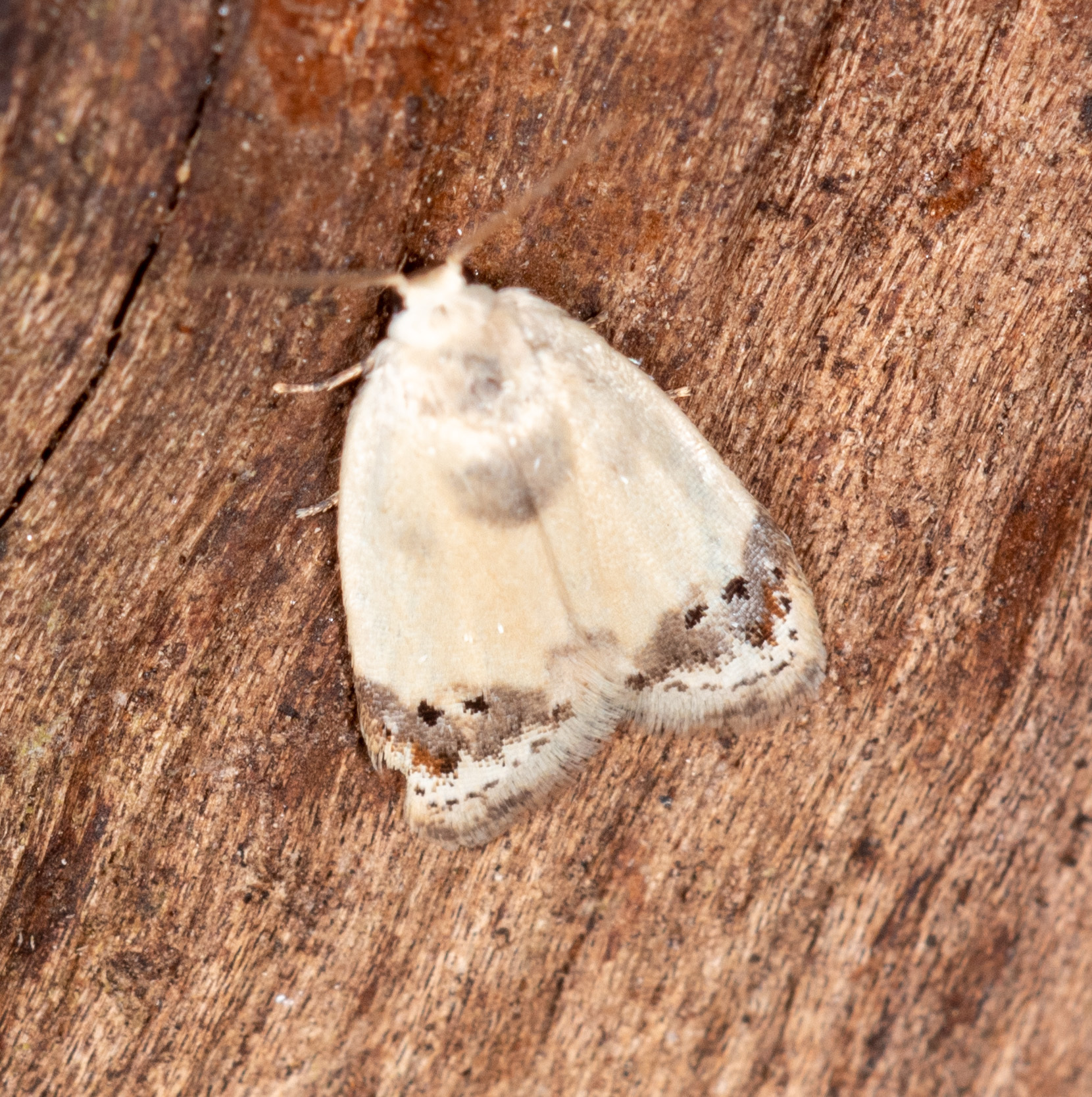
- Neoduma ectozona

Scientific classification
- Kingdom: Animalia
- Phylum: Arthropoda
- Class: Insecta
- Order: Lepidoptera
- Superfamily: Noctuoidea
- Family: Erebidae
- Subfamily: Arctiinae
- Genus: Neoduma
- Species: N. ectozona

Binomial name
- Neoduma ectozona Hampson, 1918

= Neoduma ectozona =

Species of moth

Neoduma ectozona is a moth of the subfamily Arctiinae. It was described by George Hampson in 1918. It is found on Luzon in the Philippines and on Borneo. The habitat consists of dipterocarp forests, swamps, secondary and coastal forests.
