= Dracaenura cincticorpus =

Scientific classification
- Kingdom: Animalia
- Phylum: Arthropoda
- Class: Insecta
- Order: Lepidoptera
- Family: Crambidae
- Genus: Dracaenura
- Species: D. cincticorpus

Binomial name
- Dracaenura cincticorpus Hampson, 1897

Species of moth

Dracaenura cincticorpus is a moth in the family Crambidae. It was described by George Hampson in 1897. It is found on the Loyalty Islands in the South Pacific Ocean.
