= Bradina angusta =

Scientific classification
- Domain: Eukaryota
- Kingdom: Animalia
- Phylum: Arthropoda
- Class: Insecta
- Order: Lepidoptera
- Family: Crambidae
- Genus: Bradina
- Species: B. angusta

Binomial name
- Bradina angusta (Butler, 1882)

Synonyms
- Asopia angusta Butler, 1882

Species of moth

Bradina angusta is a moth in the family Crambidae. It was described by Arthur Gardiner Butler in 1882. It is found in Papua New Guinea.
