= Macaduma macrosema =

Scientific classification
- Kingdom: Animalia
- Phylum: Arthropoda
- Class: Insecta
- Order: Lepidoptera
- Superfamily: Noctuoidea
- Family: Erebidae
- Subfamily: Arctiinae
- Genus: Macaduma
- Species: M. macrosema

Binomial name
- Macaduma macrosema Hampson, 1914

Species of moth

Macaduma macrosema is a moth of the subfamily Arctiinae. It was described by George Hampson in 1914. It is found in Papua New Guinea.
