= Bradina chlorionalis =

Scientific classification
- Domain: Eukaryota
- Kingdom: Animalia
- Phylum: Arthropoda
- Class: Insecta
- Order: Lepidoptera
- Family: Crambidae
- Genus: Bradina
- Species: B. chlorionalis

Binomial name
- Bradina chlorionalis Tams, 1935

Species of moth

Bradina chlorionalis is a moth in the family Crambidae. It was described by Tams in 1935. It is found on Samoa.
