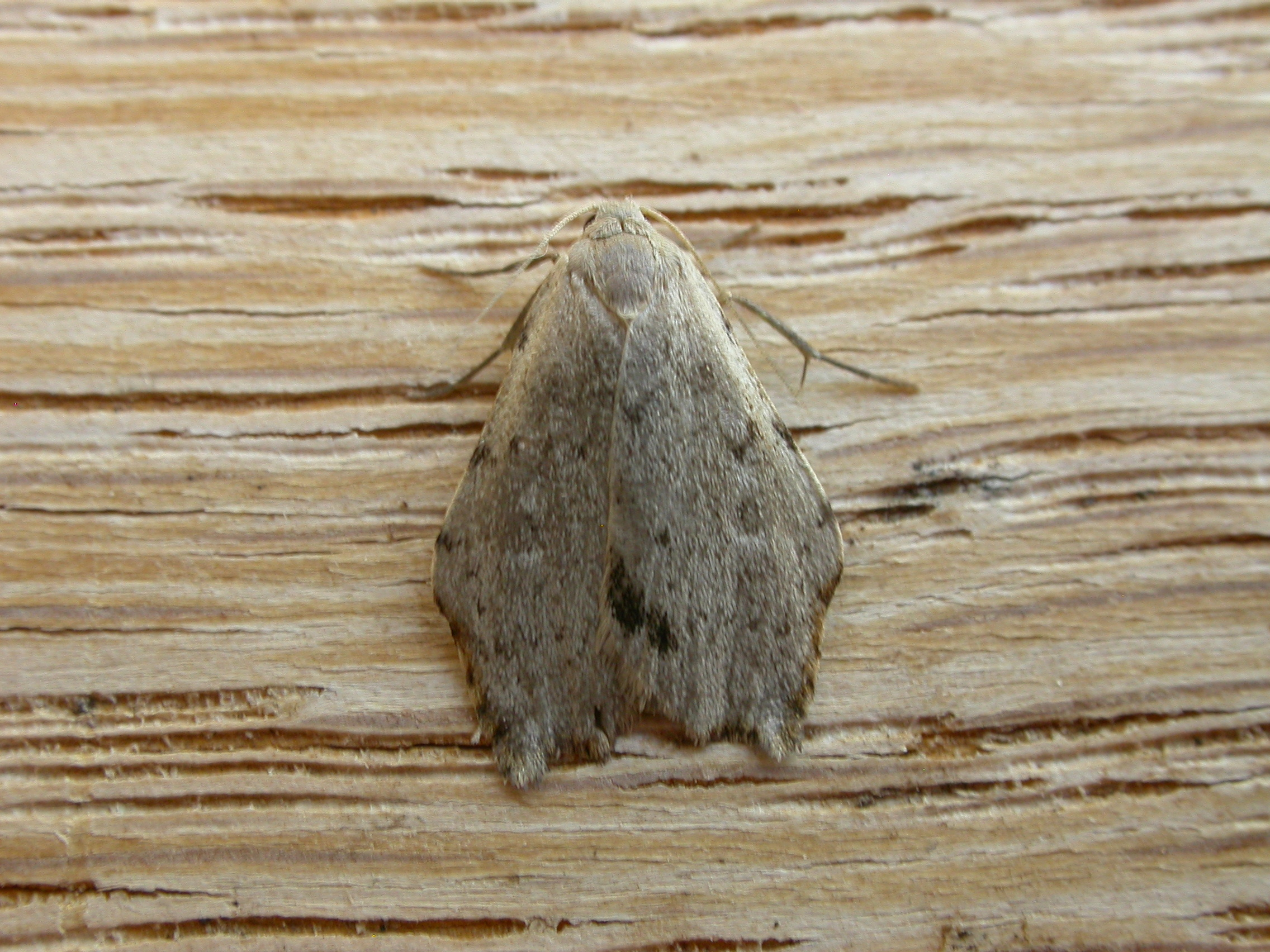

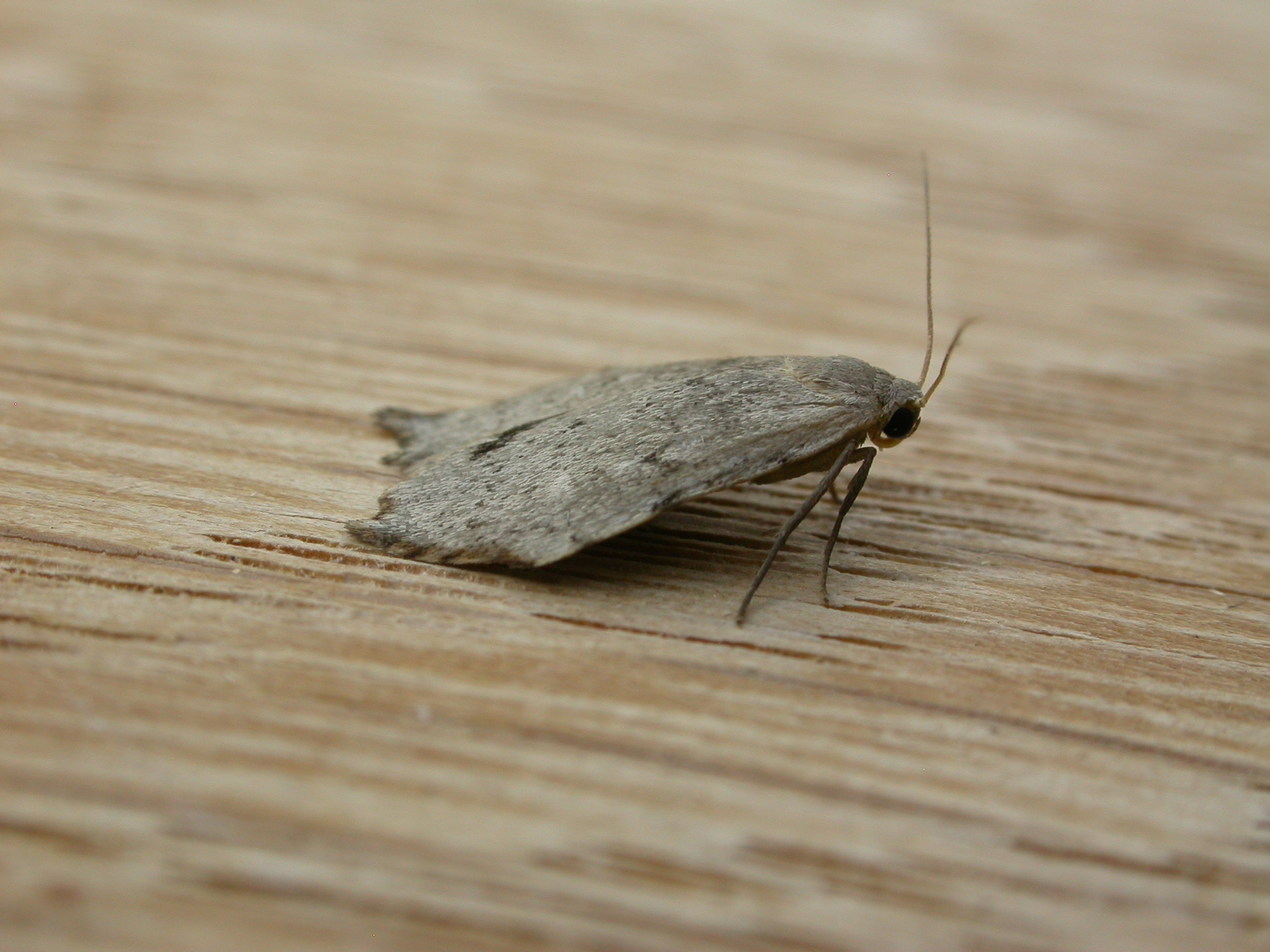

Scientific classification
- Domain: Eukaryota
- Kingdom: Animalia
- Phylum: Arthropoda
- Class: Insecta
- Order: Lepidoptera
- Superfamily: Noctuoidea
- Family: Erebidae
- Subfamily: Arctiinae
- Genus: Macaduma
- Species: M. toxophora

Binomial name
- Macaduma toxophora (Turner, 1899)

Synonyms
- Psapharacis toxophora Turner, 1899; Macaduma picroptila Hampson, 1914

= Macaduma toxophora =

Species of moth

Macaduma toxophora is a moth of the subfamily Arctiinae first described by Turner in 1899. It is found along the eastern coast of Australia from southern Queensland to Victoria.
