= Bradina postbicoloralis =

Scientific classification
- Domain: Eukaryota
- Kingdom: Animalia
- Phylum: Arthropoda
- Class: Insecta
- Order: Lepidoptera
- Family: Crambidae
- Genus: Bradina
- Species: B. postbicoloralis

Binomial name
- Bradina postbicoloralis Rothschild, 1915

Species of insect

Bradina postbicoloralis is a moth in the family Crambidae. It was described by Rothschild in 1915. It is found in Papua New Guinea.
