= Neoduma simplex =

Scientific classification
- Domain: Eukaryota
- Kingdom: Animalia
- Phylum: Arthropoda
- Class: Insecta
- Order: Lepidoptera
- Superfamily: Noctuoidea
- Family: Erebidae
- Subfamily: Arctiinae
- Genus: Neoduma
- Species: N. simplex

Binomial name
- Neoduma simplex (Pagenstecher, 1900)

Synonyms
- Nepita simplex Pagenstecher, 1900; Macaduma simplex Pagenstecher, 1900

Species of moth

Neoduma simplex is a moth of the subfamily Arctiinae. It was described by Pagenstecher in 1900. It is found in New Britain.
