= Bradina antenoralis =

Scientific classification
- Domain: Eukaryota
- Kingdom: Animalia
- Phylum: Arthropoda
- Class: Insecta
- Order: Lepidoptera
- Family: Crambidae
- Genus: Bradina
- Species: B. antenoralis

Binomial name
- Bradina antenoralis (Walker, 1859)

Synonyms
- Pyralis antenoralis Walker, 1859; Pyralis externalis Walker, 1862

Species of moth

Bradina antenoralis is a moth in the family Crambidae. It was described by Francis Walker in 1859. It is found in Brazil.
