= Bradina aureolalis =

Scientific classification
- Domain: Eukaryota
- Kingdom: Animalia
- Phylum: Arthropoda
- Class: Insecta
- Order: Lepidoptera
- Family: Crambidae
- Genus: Bradina
- Species: B. aureolalis

Binomial name
- Bradina aureolalis de Joannis, 1899

Species of moth

Bradina aureolalis is a moth in the family Crambidae. It was described by Joseph de Joannis in 1899. It is found on the Seychelles, where it has been recorded from Mahé, Silhouette and Praslin.
