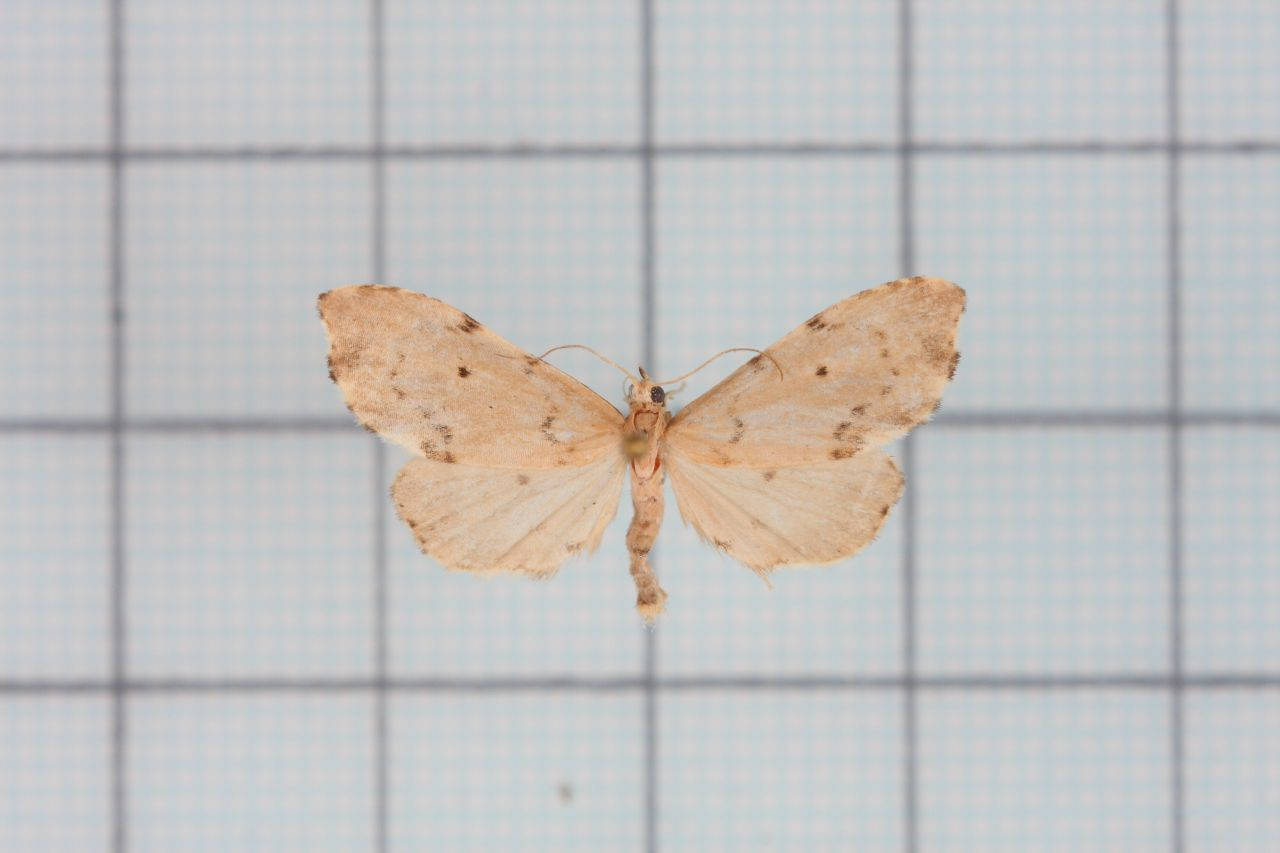

Scientific classification
- Kingdom: Animalia
- Phylum: Arthropoda
- Class: Insecta
- Order: Lepidoptera
- Superfamily: Noctuoidea
- Family: Erebidae
- Subfamily: Arctiinae
- Genus: Macaduma
- Species: M. cretacea

Binomial name
- Macaduma cretacea Hampson, 1914

Synonyms
- Oxacme cretacea (Hampson, 1914)

= Macaduma cretacea =

Species of moth

Macaduma cretacea is a moth in the subfamily Arctiinae first described by George Hampson in 1914. It is found in Taiwan.

The wingspan is 12–13 mm.
