= Willie Horace Thomas Tams =

British entomologist

Willie Horace Thomas "Tiger" Tams (1891–1980) was a British entomologist.

== Biography ==
Tams was an assistant to John Stanley Gardiner at the University of Cambridge and joined the board of the Linnean Society of London in 1913. During World War I he served in the Canadian army. In 1920 he was appointed to the Natural History Museum in London as an assistant in the Entomology department. He took part in a voyage to the Gulf of Guinea (Percy Sladen and Godman Trusts expedition to the islands in the Gulf of Guinea) from October 1932 to March 1933. He also traveled to Madeira and the Seychelles. Tams published more than 70 articles on the taxonomy of lepidoptera, including articles on the Lasiocampidae. He was a member of the British Entomological and Natural History Society, an associate of the Linnean Society of London and was assistant editor of the Entomologist's Gazette.

== List of publications ==
- Tams, W.H.T., 1924a. II. Notes on some species of the genus Cosmophila Boisd.. - Trans. Ent. Soc. Lond. pp. 20–24, Plates I.-III.
- Tams, W.H.T., 1924b. List of the moths collected in Siam by E.J. Godfrey, B.Sc., F.E.S., with descriptions of new species. J. nat. Hist. Soc. Siam 6: 229–289.
- Tams, W.H.T., 1935. Lepidoptera: Heterocera (exclusive of Geometridae and the Microlepidoptera). Insects of Samoa and other Samoan terrestrial arthropods, Part III(4): 169-290
- Tams W.H.T., 1936. Three New East African Moths. - Journal of The East Africa and Uganda Natural History Society Cil.XIII: 105-106.
- Tams, W.H.T., 1953. A pest of coconut palms in Portuguese East Africa. - Bull. Br. Mus. (Nat. Hist.) Ent., vol.3:69-73
