= Prototyla alopecopa =

Scientific classification
- Kingdom: Animalia
- Phylum: Arthropoda
- Class: Insecta
- Order: Lepidoptera
- Family: Crambidae
- Genus: Prototyla
- Species: P. alopecopa

Binomial name
- Prototyla alopecopa Meyrick, 1933

Species of moth

Prototyla alopecopa is a moth in the family Crambidae. It was described by Edward Meyrick in 1933. It is found on Fiji.
