= Prototyla haemoxantha =

Scientific classification
- Kingdom: Animalia
- Phylum: Arthropoda
- Class: Insecta
- Order: Lepidoptera
- Family: Crambidae
- Genus: Prototyla
- Species: P. haemoxantha

Binomial name
- Prototyla haemoxantha Meyrick, 1935

Species of moth

Prototyla haemoxantha is a moth in the family Crambidae. It was described by Edward Meyrick in 1935. It is found on Fiji.
