= List of cosmopterigid genera =

The moth family Cosmopterigidae contains the following genera:

- Acanthophlebia
- Acleracra
- Adeana
- Aeaea
- Aeronectris
- Afeda
- Aganoptila
- Agonismus
- Alloclita
- Allotalanta
- Amaurogramma
- Amblytenes
- Ambonostola
- Anataractis
- Anatrachyntis
- Anoncia
- Anorcota
- Antequera
- Aphanosara
- Aphthonetus
- Apothetodes
- Archisopha
- Ascalenia
- Ashibusa
- Asymphorodes
- Axiarcha
- Balionebris
- Bathraula
- Bathybalia
- Bifascioides
- Bubaloceras
- Calanesia
- Callixestis
- Calycobathra
- Cholotis
- Chrysopeleia
- Clemmatista
- Colonophora
- Cosmiosophista
- Cosmopterix
- Crobylophanes
- Cyphothyris
- Cystioecetes
- Dhahrania
- Diatonica
- Diophila
- Diplosara
- Diversivalva
- Dorodoca
- Dromiaulis
- Dynatophysis
- Dysphoria
- Ecballogonia
- Echinoscelis
- Endograptis
- Eralea
- Erechthiodes
- Eritarbes
- Eteobalea
- Euamneris
- Euclemensia
- Euhyposmocoma
- Eumenodora
- Euperissus
- Falcatariella
- Gisilia
- Glaphyristis
- Griphocosma
- Haplochrois
- Haplophylax
- Harpograptis
- Hedroxena
- Helicacma
- Herlinda
- Heterotactis
- Hodgesiella
- Homosaces
- Hyalochna
- Hyperdasysella
- Hyposmocoma
- Idiostyla
- Iressa
- Ischnangela
- Ischnobathra
- Isidiella
- Isostreptis
- Ithome
- Labdia
- Lallia
- Leptozestis
- Limnaecia
- Macrobathra
- Melanocinclis
- Melanozestis
- Meleonoma
- Melnea
- Meneptila
- Metagrypa
- Microzestis
- Minivalva
- Mothonodes
- Neachandella
- Neelysia
- Neomariania
- Nepotula
- Obithome
- Opszyga
- Orthromicta
- Otonoma
- Pancalia
- Parastagmatophora
- Parathystas
- Passalotis
- Pauroptila
- Pebops
- Pechyptila
- Perimede
- Periploca
- Persicoptila
- Pharmacoptis
- Phepsalostoma
- Phosphaticola
- Phthoraula
- Pristen
- Proterocosma
- Protogrypa
- Protorhiza
- Pseudascalenia
- Ptilochares
- Pycnagorastis
- Pyretaulax
- Pyroderces
- Ramphis
- Ressia
- Rhadinastis
- Rhinomactrum
- Sathrobrota
- Scaeosopha
- Scaeothyris
- Schendylotis
- Sematoptis
- Semnoprepia
- Semolina
- Sindicola
- Siskiwitia
- Sorhagenia
- Sorhageniella
- Spiroterma
- Stagmatophora
- Stilbosis
- Streptothyris
- Stromatitica
- Strophalingias
- Synploca
- Syntomactis
- Syntomaula
- Tanygona
- Teladoma
- Thalerostoma
- Thectophila
- Tolliella
- Trachydora
- Triclonella
- Trissodoris
- Ulochora
- Urangela
- Vulcaniella
- Walshia
- Zanclarches
