= Scaeosophinae =

Scientific classification
- Kingdom: Animalia
- Phylum: Arthropoda
- Class: Insecta
- Order: Lepidoptera
- Family: Cosmopterigidae
- Subfamily: Scaeosophinae; Meyrick, 1922

Synonyms
- Scaeosophidae

Subfamily of moths

The Scaeosophinae are a subfamily of the Cosmopterigidae.

== Genera ==
- Allotalanta
- Archisopha
- Cyphothyris
- Helicacma
- Hyalochna
- Isostreptis
- Protogrypa
- Scaeosopha
- Scalideutis
- Streptothyris
- Syntomaula
