= T. exigua =

T. exigua may refer to:

- Tasiocera exigua, a crane fly
- Tetragnatha exigua, a stretch spider
- Teladoma exigua, a cosmet moth
- Thelymitra exigua, a sun orchid
- Thermochrous exigua, an insect with intrinsic mouthparts
- Tremella exigua, a French fungus
- Trivia exigua, a false cowry
