= Persicoptila heliatma =

Scientific classification
- Kingdom: Animalia
- Phylum: Arthropoda
- Class: Insecta
- Order: Lepidoptera
- Family: Cosmopterigidae
- Genus: Persicoptila
- Species: P. heliatma

Binomial name
- Persicoptila heliatma Meyrick, 1935

Species of moth

Persicoptila heliatma is a moth in the family Cosmopterigidae. It is found on the Solomon Islands.
