= Teladoma murina =

Scientific classification
- Kingdom: Animalia
- Phylum: Arthropoda
- Clade: Pancrustacea
- Class: Insecta
- Order: Lepidoptera
- Family: Cosmopterigidae
- Genus: Teladoma
- Species: T. murina

Binomial name
- Teladoma murina Hodges, 1962

Species of moth

Teladoma murina is a moth in the family Cosmopterigidae. It is found in North America, where it has been recorded from Texas and Arizona.
