= Dorodoca eometalla =

Scientific classification
- Kingdom: Animalia
- Phylum: Arthropoda
- Class: Insecta
- Order: Lepidoptera
- Family: Cosmopterigidae
- Genus: Dorodoca
- Species: D. eometalla

Binomial name
- Dorodoca eometalla Meyrick, 1926

Species of moth

Dorodoca eometalla is a moth in the family Cosmopterigidae. It is found in Namibia.
