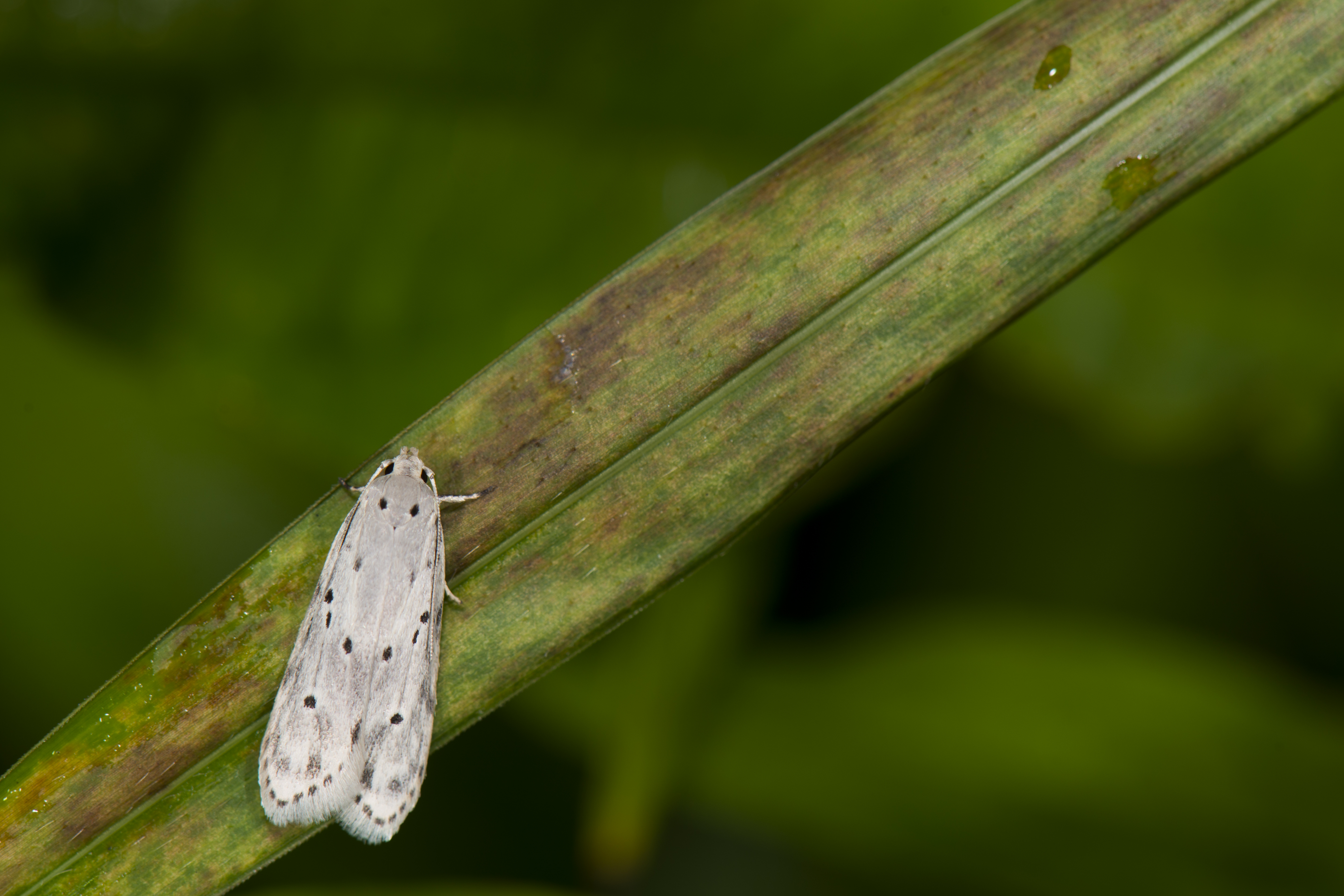

Scientific classification
- Kingdom: Animalia
- Phylum: Arthropoda
- Class: Insecta
- Order: Lepidoptera
- Family: Cosmopterigidae
- Genus: Syntomaula
- Species: S. simulatella

Binomial name
- Syntomaula simulatella (Walker, 1864)

Synonyms
- Cryptolechia simulatella Walker, 1864; Cryptolechia niveosella Walker, 1864

= Syntomaula simulatella =

Species of moth

Syntomaula simulatella is a moth in the family Cosmopterigidae. It is found on Borneo, in French Polynesia, Taiwan and Japan.

The wingspan is about 20 mm.
