= Syntomaula microsperma =

Scientific classification
- Kingdom: Animalia
- Phylum: Arthropoda
- Class: Insecta
- Order: Lepidoptera
- Family: Cosmopterigidae
- Genus: Syntomaula
- Species: S. microsperma

Binomial name
- Syntomaula microsperma (Diakonoff, 1954)

Synonyms
- Bathybalia microsperma Diakonoff, 1954

Species of moth

Syntomaula microsperma is a moth in the family Cosmopterigidae. It is found in New Guinea.
