= Sindicola juengeri =

Scientific classification
- Kingdom: Animalia
- Phylum: Arthropoda
- Class: Insecta
- Order: Lepidoptera
- Family: Cosmopterigidae
- Genus: Sindicola
- Species: S. juengeri

Binomial name
- Sindicola juengeri Amsel, 1968

Species of moth

Sindicola juengeri is a moth in the family Cosmopterigidae. It is found in Pakistan.
