= Calycobathra pakistanella =

Scientific classification
- Kingdom: Animalia
- Phylum: Arthropoda
- Clade: Pancrustacea
- Class: Insecta
- Order: Lepidoptera
- Family: Cosmopterigidae
- Genus: Calycobathra
- Species: C. pakistanella

Binomial name
- Calycobathra pakistanella Kasy, 1968

Species of moth

Calycobathra pakistanella is a moth in the family Cosmopterigidae. It was described by Kasy in 1968. It is found in western Pakistan and Afghanistan.

The wingspan is 8.5–10.5 mm. Adults have been recorded on wing in mid-May in Pakistan and mid-June in Afghanistan.
