= Eralea albalineella =

Scientific classification
- Kingdom: Animalia
- Phylum: Arthropoda
- Clade: Pancrustacea
- Class: Insecta
- Order: Lepidoptera
- Family: Cosmopterigidae
- Genus: Eralea
- Species: E. albalineella

Binomial name
- Eralea albalineella (Chambers, 1878)

Synonyms
- Eriphia albalineella Chambers, 1878; Eralea striata Hodges, 1962

Species of moth

Eralea albalineella is a moth in the family Cosmopterigidae. It is found in North America, where it has been recorded from West Virginia, South Carolina, Louisiana and Florida to Texas and California.

The wingspan is about 7 mm. Adults have been recorded on wing from April to July and in September and November.
