= Teladoma astigmatica =

Scientific classification
- Kingdom: Animalia
- Phylum: Arthropoda
- Clade: Pancrustacea
- Class: Insecta
- Order: Lepidoptera
- Family: Cosmopterigidae
- Genus: Teladoma
- Species: T. astigmatica

Binomial name
- Teladoma astigmatica (Meyrick, 1928)

Synonyms
- Paratheta astigmatica Meyrick, 1928

Species of moth

Teladoma astigmatica is a moth in the family Cosmopterigidae. It is found in North America, where it has been recorded from western Texas and southern New Mexico.
