= Hodgesiella rebeli =

Scientific classification
- Kingdom: Animalia
- Phylum: Arthropoda
- Clade: Pancrustacea
- Class: Insecta
- Order: Lepidoptera
- Family: Cosmopterigidae
- Genus: Hodgesiella
- Species: H. rebeli

Binomial name
- Hodgesiella rebeli (Krone, 1905)

Synonyms
- Stagmatophora rebeli Krone, 1905

Species of moth

Hodgesiella rebeli is a moth in the family Cosmopterigidae. It is found in Italy, Croatia, Hungary, Romania, North Macedonia, Albania and Greece.

== Description ==
The wingspan is 11–12 mm. The ground colour of the forewings is black with three white lines. The hindwings are whitish grey.

== Larvae ==
The larvae feed on Convolvulus althaeoides, Convolvulus althaeoides tenuissimus and Convolvulus cantabrica. They mine the leaves of their host plant. The mine starts as a narrow gallery where all the frass is concentrated. This narrow area quickly widens into a large blotch. The larvae create silk, which they deposit in the mine, causing some length folds to develop. The larvae can be found in May.
