= Persicoptila leucosarca =

Scientific classification
- Kingdom: Animalia
- Phylum: Arthropoda
- Class: Insecta
- Order: Lepidoptera
- Family: Cosmopterigidae
- Genus: Persicoptila
- Species: P. leucosarca

Binomial name
- Persicoptila leucosarca Meyrick, 1936

Species of moth

Persicoptila leucosarca is a moth in the family Cosmopterigidae. It is found in Taiwan.
