= Hodgesiella puplesisi =

Scientific classification
- Kingdom: Animalia
- Phylum: Arthropoda
- Clade: Pancrustacea
- Class: Insecta
- Order: Lepidoptera
- Family: Cosmopterigidae
- Genus: Hodgesiella
- Species: H. puplesisi

Binomial name
- Hodgesiella puplesisi Sinev, 1989

Species of moth

Hodgesiella puplesisi is a moth in the family Cosmopterigidae.
