= Melanocinclis vibex =

Scientific classification
- Kingdom: Animalia
- Phylum: Arthropoda
- Clade: Pancrustacea
- Class: Insecta
- Order: Lepidoptera
- Family: Cosmopterigidae
- Genus: Melanocinclis
- Species: M. vibex

Binomial name
- Melanocinclis vibex Hodges, 1978

Species of moth

Melanocinclis vibex is a species of moth in the family Cosmopterigidae. It is found in North America, where it has been recorded from Florida.

The wingspan is about 8 mm. Adults have been recorded on wing from May to July.

The larvae possibly feed in the flowers of Serenoa repens.
