= Cnemidolophus =

Scientific classification
- Kingdom: Animalia
- Phylum: Arthropoda
- Class: Insecta
- Order: Lepidoptera
- Family: Cosmopterigidae
- Subfamily: Antequerinae
- Genus: Cnemidolophus; Walsingham, 1881
- Species: C. lavernellus

Binomial name
- Cnemidolophus lavernellus Walsingham, 1881

Genus of moths

Cnemidolophus is a genus of moths in the family Cosmopterigidae. It contains only one species, Cnemidolophus lavernellus, which is found in Kenya, South Africa, Tanzania and Gambia.
