= Neomelanesthes atopa =

Scientific classification
- Kingdom: Animalia
- Phylum: Arthropoda
- Class: Insecta
- Order: Lepidoptera
- Family: Cosmopterigidae
- Genus: Neomelanesthes
- Species: N. atopa

Binomial name
- Neomelanesthes atopa (Bradley, 1957)

Synonyms
- Limnaecia atopa Bradley, 1957; Melanesthes atopa

Species of moth

Neomelanesthes atopa is a moth in the family Cosmopterigidae. It is found on Rennell Island.
