= Echinoscelis pandani =

Scientific classification
- Kingdom: Animalia
- Phylum: Arthropoda
- Class: Insecta
- Order: Lepidoptera
- Family: Cosmopterigidae
- Genus: Echinoscelis
- Species: E. pandani

Binomial name
- Echinoscelis pandani (Turner, 1923)

Synonyms
- Isorrhoa pandani Turner, 1923

Species of moth

Echinoscelis pandani is a species of moth in the family Cosmopterigidae. It is found in Australia. Echinoscelis pandani is described to occupy cool temperate rainforest in montane Tasmania.
