= Scalideutis escharia =

Scientific classification
- Kingdom: Animalia
- Phylum: Arthropoda
- Class: Insecta
- Order: Lepidoptera
- Family: Cosmopterigidae
- Genus: Scalideutis
- Species: S. escharia

Binomial name
- Scalideutis escharia Meyrick, 1906

Species of moth

Scalideutis escharia is a moth in the family Cosmopterigidae. It was described by Edward Meyrick in 1906. It is found in Sri Lanka.
