= Persicoptila rhodocnemis =

Scientific classification
- Kingdom: Animalia
- Phylum: Arthropoda
- Class: Insecta
- Order: Lepidoptera
- Family: Cosmopterigidae
- Genus: Persicoptila
- Species: P. rhodocnemis

Binomial name
- Persicoptila rhodocnemis Meyrick, 1897

Species of moth

Persicoptila rhodocnemis is a moth in the family Cosmopterigidae. It was described by Edward Meyrick in 1897. It is found in Australia, where it has been recorded from Queensland.
