= Dorodoca leucomochla =

Scientific classification
- Kingdom: Animalia
- Phylum: Arthropoda
- Class: Insecta
- Order: Lepidoptera
- Family: Cosmopterigidae
- Genus: Dorodoca
- Species: D. leucomochla

Binomial name
- Dorodoca leucomochla Meyrick, 1922

Species of moth

Dorodoca leucomochla is a moth in the family Cosmopterigidae. It is found in Burma.
