= Persicoptila heroica =

Scientific classification
- Domain: Eukaryota
- Kingdom: Animalia
- Phylum: Arthropoda
- Class: Insecta
- Order: Lepidoptera
- Family: Cosmopterigidae
- Genus: Persicoptila
- Species: P. heroica

Binomial name
- Persicoptila heroica Meyrick, 1928

Species of moth

Persicoptila heroica is a moth in the family Cosmopterigidae. It is found on the New Hebrides.
