= Homosaces anthocoma =

Scientific classification
- Kingdom: Animalia
- Phylum: Arthropoda
- Class: Insecta
- Order: Lepidoptera
- Family: Cosmopterigidae
- Genus: Homosaces
- Species: H. anthocoma

Binomial name
- Homosaces anthocoma Meyrick, 1894

Species of moth

Homosaces anthocoma is a moth in the family Cosmopterigidae. It is found in Burma.
