= Falcatariella hirsutella =

Scientific classification
- Kingdom: Animalia
- Phylum: Arthropoda
- Clade: Pancrustacea
- Class: Insecta
- Order: Lepidoptera
- Family: Cosmopterigidae
- Genus: Falcatariella
- Species: F. hirsutella

Binomial name
- Falcatariella hirsutella Viette, 1968

Species of moth

Falcatariella hirsutella is a moth in the family Cosmopterigidae. It is found in Madagascar.
