= Hodgesiella callistrepta =

Scientific classification
- Kingdom: Animalia
- Phylum: Arthropoda
- Class: Insecta
- Order: Lepidoptera
- Family: Cosmopterigidae
- Genus: Hodgesiella
- Species: H. callistrepta

Binomial name
- Hodgesiella callistrepta (Meyrick, 1917)

Synonyms
- Stagmatophora callistrepta Meyrick, 1917; Labdia callistrepta

Species of moth

Hodgesiella callistrepta is a moth in the family Cosmopterigidae. It is found in India.
