= Syntomaula tephrota =

Scientific classification
- Kingdom: Animalia
- Phylum: Arthropoda
- Class: Insecta
- Order: Lepidoptera
- Family: Cosmopterigidae
- Genus: Syntomaula
- Species: S. tephrota

Binomial name
- Syntomaula tephrota Meyrick, 1914

Species of moth

Syntomaula tephrota is a moth in the family Cosmopterigidae. It is found in Sri Lanka.
