= Melanocinclis nigrilineella =

Scientific classification
- Kingdom: Animalia
- Phylum: Arthropoda
- Clade: Pancrustacea
- Class: Insecta
- Order: Lepidoptera
- Family: Cosmopterigidae
- Genus: Melanocinclis
- Species: M. nigrilineella

Binomial name
- Melanocinclis nigrilineella (Chambers, 1878)

Synonyms
- Eriphia nigrilineella Chambers, 1878

Species of moth

Melanocinclis nigrilineella is a moth in the family Cosmopterigidae. It is found in North America, where it has been recorded from Texas and Arizona.
