= Colonophora ictifera =

Scientific classification
- Kingdom: Animalia
- Phylum: Arthropoda
- Class: Insecta
- Order: Lepidoptera
- Family: Cosmopterigidae
- Genus: Colonophora
- Species: C. ictifera

Binomial name
- Colonophora ictifera Meyrick, 1937

Species of moth

Colonophora ictifera is a moth in the family Cosmopterigidae. It is found in South Africa.
