= Hodgesiella christophi =

Scientific classification
- Kingdom: Animalia
- Phylum: Arthropoda
- Clade: Pancrustacea
- Class: Insecta
- Order: Lepidoptera
- Family: Cosmopterigidae
- Genus: Hodgesiella
- Species: H. christophi

Binomial name
- Hodgesiella christophi Koster & Sinev, 2003

Species of moth

Hodgesiella christophi is a moth of the family Cosmopterigidae that is endemic to Asia Minor.

The wingspan is 8–10 millimetres (0.31–0.39 in). Adults have been recorded from mid to the end of June.
