= Ressiana =

Ressiana may refer to

- Rhesaina, a late Roman city in Mesopotamia Secunda
- Ressiana (North Africa), a late Roman City in North Africa

== See also ==
- Resana
- Ressia
