= Ashibusa aculeata =

Scientific classification
- Kingdom: Animalia
- Phylum: Arthropoda
- Clade: Pancrustacea
- Class: Insecta
- Order: Lepidoptera
- Family: Cosmopterigidae
- Genus: Ashibusa
- Species: A. aculeata

Binomial name
- Ashibusa aculeata Z.W. Zhang & H.H. Li, 2009

Species of moth

Ashibusa aculeata is a moth of the family Cosmopterigidae. It is found in China.
