= Homosaces arvalis =

Scientific classification
- Kingdom: Animalia
- Phylum: Arthropoda
- Class: Insecta
- Order: Lepidoptera
- Family: Cosmopterigidae
- Genus: Homosaces
- Species: H. arvalis

Binomial name
- Homosaces arvalis (Meyrick, 1910)

Synonyms
- Cryptolechia arvalis Meyrick, 1910

Species of moth

Homosaces arvalis is a moth in the family Cosmopterigidae. It is found in India.

The wingspan is 15–17 mm. The forewings are ferruginous sprinkled with black. The costa and all veins are marked with suffused pale ochreous-yellow streaks. The hindwings are dark grey.
