= Hodgesiella lampropeda =

Scientific classification
- Kingdom: Animalia
- Phylum: Arthropoda
- Class: Insecta
- Order: Lepidoptera
- Family: Cosmopterigidae
- Genus: Hodgesiella
- Species: H. lampropeda

Binomial name
- Hodgesiella lampropeda (Meyrick, 1917)

Synonyms
- Labdia lampropeda Meyrick, 1917; Pyroderces lampropeda

Species of moth

Hodgesiella lampropeda is a moth in the family Cosmopterigidae. It is found in India.
