= Teladoma helianthi =

Scientific classification
- Kingdom: Animalia
- Phylum: Arthropoda
- Class: Insecta
- Order: Lepidoptera
- Family: Cosmopterigidae
- Genus: Teladoma
- Species: T. helianthi

Binomial name
- Teladoma helianthi Busck, 1932

Species of moth

Teladoma helianthi is a moth in the family Cosmopterigidae. It is found in North America, where it has been recorded from Ohio, Oklahoma, South Carolina, North Carolina, Illinois, Arkansas, South Dakota, Arizona, Washington and California.

The wingspan is about 9 mm. Adults have been recorded on wing from May to August.

The larvae feed on Helianthus and Xanthium species. They create blister mines on the leaves of their host plant.
