= Syntomaula cana =

Scientific classification
- Kingdom: Animalia
- Phylum: Arthropoda
- Class: Insecta
- Order: Lepidoptera
- Family: Cosmopterigidae
- Genus: Syntomaula
- Species: S. cana

Binomial name
- Syntomaula cana Moriuti, 1977

Species of moth

Syntomaula cana is a moth in the family Cosmopterigidae. It is found in Japan.
