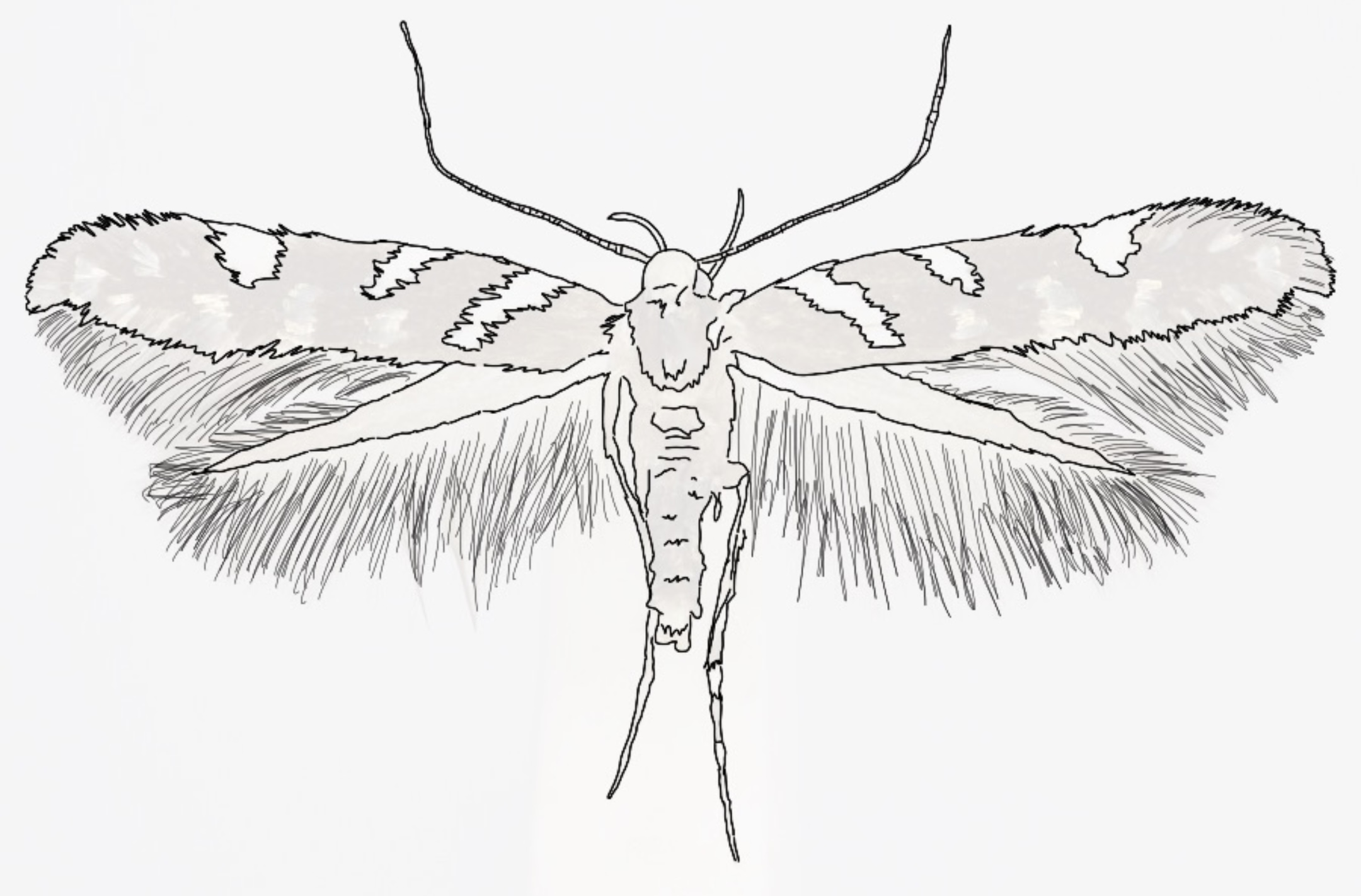

Scientific classification
- Kingdom: Animalia
- Phylum: Arthropoda
- Class: Insecta
- Order: Lepidoptera
- Family: Cosmopterigidae
- Genus: Ramphis
- Species: R. libanoticus

Binomial name
- Ramphis libanoticus Riedl, 1969

= Ramphis libanoticus =

Species of moth

Ramphis libanoticus is a moth in the family Cosmopterigidae. It is found in Greece, Crete, Cyprus and Asia Minor (including Lebanon).

The wingspan is 9–11 mm. Adults are on wing from May to July and in October.

The larvae feed on Salvia triloba. They mine the leaves of their host plant.

== Appearance ==
The adult is small and delicate, its wings and body mainly covered by dark brown chitin hairs, with streaks of white. Its hindwings are largely composed of very thin strands of chitin, of which also protrude from the end of its forewings. Its abdomen is a deep brown, with a pale frill at the end. Its antenna are long and striped.
