= Isidiella labathiella =

Scientific classification
- Kingdom: Animalia
- Phylum: Arthropoda
- Clade: Pancrustacea
- Class: Insecta
- Order: Lepidoptera
- Family: Cosmopterigidae
- Genus: Isidiella
- Species: I. labathiella

Binomial name
- Isidiella labathiella (Viette, 1956)

Synonyms
- Cosmopterix labathiella Viette, 1956

Species of moth

Isidiella labathiella is a moth in the family Cosmopterigidae. It is found in Madagascar.
