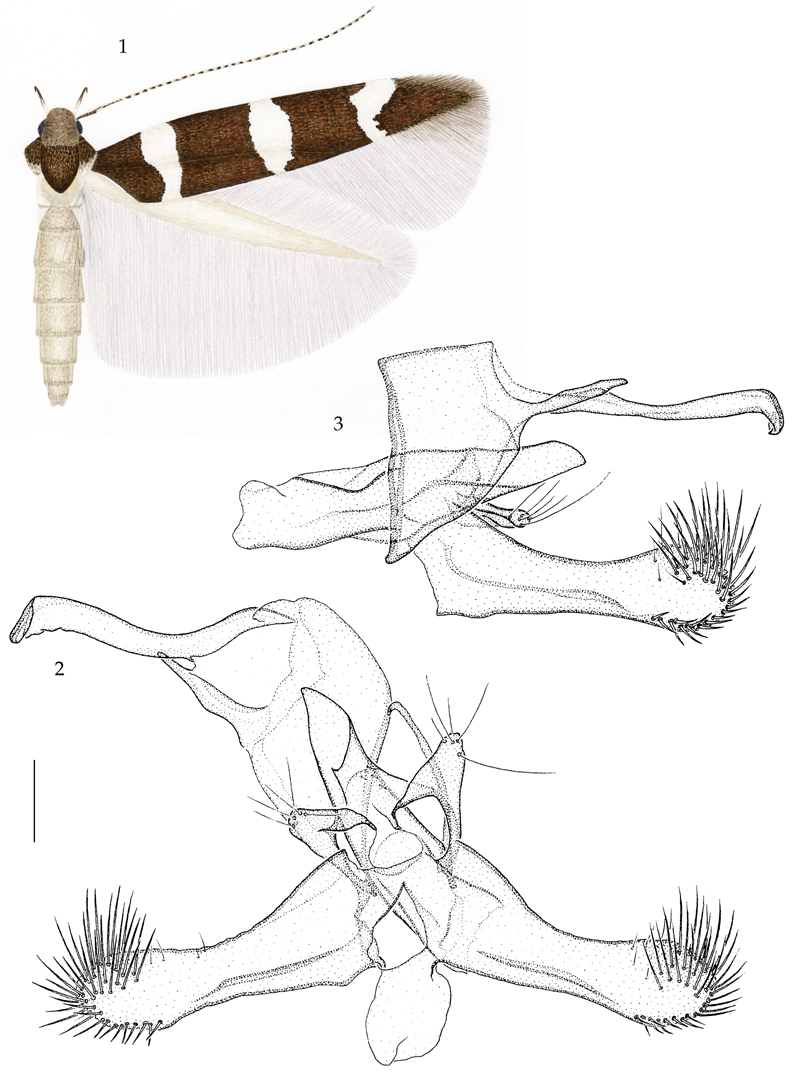
- 1. adult; 2. male genitalia; 3. male genitalia, laterally

Scientific classification
- Domain: Eukaryota
- Kingdom: Animalia
- Phylum: Arthropoda
- Class: Insecta
- Order: Lepidoptera
- Family: Cosmopterigidae
- Genus: Hodgesiella
- Species: H. quagella

Binomial name
- Hodgesiella quagella (Christoph, 1887)

Synonyms
- Hodgesiella ruticosae Falkovitsh, 1986

= Hodgesiella quagella =

Species of moth

Hodgesiella quagella is a moth of the family Cosmopterigidae described by Hugo Theodor Christoph in 1887. It is found in Turkmenistan, Uzbekistan and Afghanistan.

Adults are on wing in May.

The larvae feed on Convolvulus fruticosus.
