= Chalcocolona =

Scientific classification
- Kingdom: Animalia
- Phylum: Arthropoda
- Class: Insecta
- Order: Lepidoptera
- Family: Cosmopterigidae
- Subfamily: Antequerinae
- Genus: Chalcocolona; Meyrick, 1921
- Species: C. cyananthes

Binomial name
- Chalcocolona cyananthes (Meyrick, 1911)

Synonyms
- Cnemidophorus cyananthes Meyrick, 1911

Genus of moths

Chalcocolona is a genus of moths in the family Cosmopterigidae. It contains only one species, Chalcocolona cyananthes, which is found in South Africa and Zimbabwe.
