= Persicoptila ramulosa =

Scientific classification
- Kingdom: Animalia
- Phylum: Arthropoda
- Class: Insecta
- Order: Lepidoptera
- Family: Cosmopterigidae
- Genus: Persicoptila
- Species: P. ramulosa

Binomial name
- Persicoptila ramulosa Meyrick, 1921

Species of moth

Persicoptila ramulosa is a moth in the family Cosmopterigidae. It is found in Australia, where it has been recorded from Queensland.
