= Ressia auriculata =

Scientific classification
- Domain: Eukaryota
- Kingdom: Animalia
- Phylum: Arthropoda
- Class: Insecta
- Order: Lepidoptera
- Family: Cosmopterigidae
- Genus: Ressia
- Species: R. auriculata

Binomial name
- Ressia auriculata Zhang & Li, 2010

Species of moth

Ressia auriculata is a moth in the family Cosmopterigidae found in China (Henan, Shaanxi, Sichuan).

The wingspan is 10–11.5 mm.
