= Melanocinclis gnoma =

Scientific classification
- Kingdom: Animalia
- Phylum: Arthropoda
- Clade: Pancrustacea
- Class: Insecta
- Order: Lepidoptera
- Family: Cosmopterigidae
- Genus: Melanocinclis
- Species: M. gnoma

Binomial name
- Melanocinclis gnoma Hodges, 1978

Species of moth

Melanocinclis gnoma is a moth in the family Cosmopterigidae. It is found in North America, where it has been recorded from Florida.
