= Calycobathra acarpa =

Scientific classification
- Kingdom: Animalia
- Phylum: Arthropoda
- Class: Insecta
- Order: Lepidoptera
- Family: Cosmopterigidae
- Genus: Calycobathra
- Species: C. acarpa

Binomial name
- Calycobathra acarpa Meyrick, 1891

Synonyms
- Calycobathra acarpa var. pinguescentella Chrétien, 1915; Blastobasis sublineatella Lucas, 1933

Species of moth

Calycobathra acarpa is a moth in the family Cosmopterigidae. It is found in North Africa (Algeria) and the Near East (Israel).

The wingspan is 11–12 mm. Adults are on wing from April to June and from September to October. There are probably two generations per year.
