= Tolliella fulguritella =

Scientific classification
- Kingdom: Animalia
- Phylum: Arthropoda
- Class: Insecta
- Order: Lepidoptera
- Family: Cosmopterigidae
- Genus: Tolliella
- Species: T. fulguritella

Binomial name
- Tolliella fulguritella (Ragonot, 1895)

Synonyms
- Stagmatophora fulguritella Ragonot, 1895; Limnoecia copidobathra Meyrick, 1936; Tolliella copidobathra

Species of moth

Tolliella fulguritella is a moth of the family Cosmopterigidae. It is found in Asia Minor and the Near East (Turkey, Lebanon, Syria, Jordan and Iraq).

The wingspan is 17–25 mm. Adults have been recorded in July.
