= Ressia tonkinella =

Scientific classification
- Kingdom: Animalia
- Phylum: Arthropoda
- Clade: Pancrustacea
- Class: Insecta
- Order: Lepidoptera
- Family: Cosmopterigidae
- Genus: Ressia
- Species: R. tonkinella

Binomial name
- Ressia tonkinella Sinev, 1988

Species of moth

Ressia tonkinella is a moth in the family Cosmopterigidae. It is found in Vietnam.
