= Persicoptila peltias =

Scientific classification
- Kingdom: Animalia
- Phylum: Arthropoda
- Class: Insecta
- Order: Lepidoptera
- Family: Cosmopterigidae
- Genus: Persicoptila
- Species: P. peltias

Binomial name
- Persicoptila peltias Meyrick, 1897

Synonyms
- Batrachedra peltias

Species of moth

Persicoptila peltias is a moth in the family Cosmopterigidae. It was described by Edward Meyrick in 1897. It is found in Australia, where it has been recorded from Queensland.
