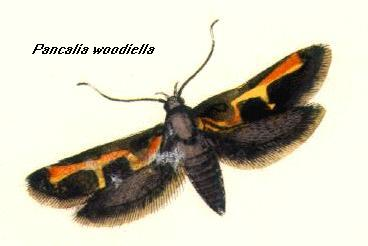
- Illustration of Euclemensia woodiella

Scientific classification
- Kingdom: Animalia
- Phylum: Arthropoda
- Clade: Pancrustacea
- Class: Insecta
- Order: Lepidoptera
- Family: Cosmopterigidae
- Subfamily: Antequerinae; Hodges, 1978

= Antequerinae =

Subfamily of moths

The Antequerinae are a subfamily of the Cosmopterigidae. In the Nearctic, the subfamily consists of eight species in four genera, found in North America and England.

== Genera ==
- Alloclita
- Antequera
- Chalcocolona Meyrick, 1921
- Cnemidolophus Walsingham, 1881
- Cosmiosophista
- Euclemensia
- Gibeauxiella
- Lamachaera Meyrick, 1915
- Limnaecia (or placed in Cosmopteriginae)
- Macrobathra Meyrick, 1883 (or placed in Cosmopteriginae)
- Meleonoma Meyrick, 1914 (or placed in Cosmopteriginae)
- Pancalia
- Phosphaticola Viette, 1951
