= Idiostyla catharopis =

Scientific classification
- Kingdom: Animalia
- Phylum: Arthropoda
- Class: Insecta
- Order: Lepidoptera
- Family: Cosmopterigidae
- Genus: Idiostyla
- Species: I. catharopis

Binomial name
- Idiostyla catharopis Meyrick, 1922

Species of moth

Idiostyla catharopis is a moth in the family Cosmopterigidae. It is found on Fiji.
