= Semolina (disambiguation) =

Semolina is the middlings of durum wheat.

Semolina may also refer to:

- Semolina (horse), a racehorse
- Semolina (moth), a genus of moth
- Semolina pudding, or semolina porridge, made from semolina
