= Ramphis ibericus =

Scientific classification
- Kingdom: Animalia
- Phylum: Arthropoda
- Class: Insecta
- Order: Lepidoptera
- Family: Cosmopterigidae
- Genus: Ramphis
- Species: R. ibericus

Binomial name
- Ramphis ibericus Riedl, 1969

Species of moth

Ramphis ibericus is a moth in the family Cosmopterigidae. It is found in Spain.

The wingspan is 7–11 mm. Adults are on wing in June and July.

== Appearance ==
The adult is a small and delicate, its wings and body mainly covered by dark brown chitin hairs, with streaks of white. Its hindwings are largely composed of very thin strands of chitin, of which also protrude from the end of its forewings
