= Scalideutis ulocoma =

Scientific classification
- Kingdom: Animalia
- Phylum: Arthropoda
- Class: Insecta
- Order: Lepidoptera
- Family: Cosmopterigidae
- Genus: Scalideutis
- Species: S. ulocoma

Binomial name
- Scalideutis ulocoma Meyrick, 1918

Species of moth

Scalideutis ulocoma is a moth in the family Cosmopterigidae. It was described by Edward Meyrick in 1918. It is found in India.
