= Persicoptila arenosa =

Scientific classification
- Domain: Eukaryota
- Kingdom: Animalia
- Phylum: Arthropoda
- Class: Insecta
- Order: Lepidoptera
- Family: Cosmopterigidae
- Genus: Persicoptila
- Species: P. arenosa

Binomial name
- Persicoptila arenosa Turner, 1917

Species of moth

Persicoptila arenosa is a moth in the family Cosmopterigidae. It was described by Alfred Jefferis Turner in 1917. It is found in Australia, where it has been recorded from Queensland.
