= Scalideutis =

Scientific classification
- Kingdom: Animalia
- Phylum: Arthropoda
- Class: Insecta
- Order: Lepidoptera
- Family: Cosmopterigidae
- Subfamily: Scaeosophinae
- Genus: Scalideutis; Meyrick, 1906

Synonyms
- Liozancla Turner, 1919

Genus of moths

Scalideutis is a genus of moths in the family Cosmopterigidae.

== Species ==
- Scalideutis escharia Meyrick, 1906
- Scalideutis ulocoma Meyrick, 1918
