= Aganoptila durata =

Scientific classification
- Kingdom: Animalia
- Phylum: Arthropoda
- Class: Insecta
- Order: Lepidoptera
- Family: Cosmopterigidae
- Genus: Aganoptila
- Species: A. durata

Binomial name
- Aganoptila durata Meyrick, 1922

Species of moth

Aganoptila durata is a moth in the family Cosmopterigidae. It was described by Edward Meyrick in 1922. It is found in India.
