= Eralea abludo =

Scientific classification
- Kingdom: Animalia
- Phylum: Arthropoda
- Clade: Pancrustacea
- Class: Insecta
- Order: Lepidoptera
- Family: Cosmopterigidae
- Genus: Eralea
- Species: E. abludo

Binomial name
- Eralea abludo Hodges, 1978

Synonyms
- Eralea abludius

Species of moth

Eralea abludo is a moth in the family Cosmopterigidae. It is found in North America, where it has been recorded from Florida.
