= Ischnobathra dormiens =

Scientific classification
- Kingdom: Animalia
- Phylum: Arthropoda
- Class: Insecta
- Order: Lepidoptera
- Family: Cosmopterigidae
- Genus: Ischnobathra
- Species: I. dormiens

Binomial name
- Ischnobathra dormiens Meyrick, 1937

Species of moth

Ischnobathra dormiens is a moth in the family Cosmopterigidae. It is found in South Africa.
