= Dorodoca chrysaula =

Scientific classification
- Kingdom: Animalia
- Phylum: Arthropoda
- Class: Insecta
- Order: Lepidoptera
- Family: Cosmopterigidae
- Genus: Dorodoca
- Species: D. chrysaula

Binomial name
- Dorodoca chrysaula (Meyrick, 1927)

Synonyms
- Stathmopoda chrysaula Meyrick, 1927

Species of moth

Dorodoca chrysaula is a moth in the family Cosmopterigidae. It is found on New Ireland.
