= Ashibusa sinensis =

Scientific classification
- Kingdom: Animalia
- Phylum: Arthropoda
- Clade: Pancrustacea
- Class: Insecta
- Order: Lepidoptera
- Family: Cosmopterigidae
- Genus: Ashibusa
- Species: A. sinensis

Binomial name
- Ashibusa sinensis Z.W. Zhang & H.H. Li, 2009

Species of moth

Ashibusa sinensis is a moth of the family Cosmopterigidae. It was described Z.W. Zhang and H.H. Li in 2009, and is endemic to China.
