= Persicoptila chiasta =

Scientific classification
- Kingdom: Animalia
- Phylum: Arthropoda
- Class: Insecta
- Order: Lepidoptera
- Family: Cosmopterigidae
- Genus: Persicoptila
- Species: P. chiasta

Binomial name
- Persicoptila chiasta Meyrick, 1909

Species of moth

Persicoptila chiasta is a moth in the family Cosmopterigidae. It is found in Sri Lanka.
