= Echinoscelis hemithia =

Scientific classification
- Kingdom: Animalia
- Phylum: Arthropoda
- Class: Insecta
- Order: Lepidoptera
- Family: Cosmopterigidae
- Genus: Echinoscelis
- Species: E. hemithia

Binomial name
- Echinoscelis hemithia Meyrick, 1886

Species of moth

Echinoscelis hemithia is a species of moth in the family Cosmopterigidae. It is found in Tonga.
