= Dorodoca chrysomochla =

Scientific classification
- Kingdom: Animalia
- Phylum: Arthropoda
- Class: Insecta
- Order: Lepidoptera
- Family: Cosmopterigidae
- Genus: Dorodoca
- Species: D. chrysomochla

Binomial name
- Dorodoca chrysomochla Meyrick, 1915

Species of moth

Dorodoca chrysomochla is a moth in the family Cosmopterigidae. It is found in India.
