= Herlinda fasciola =

Scientific classification
- Kingdom: Animalia
- Phylum: Arthropoda
- Class: Insecta
- Order: Lepidoptera
- Family: Cosmopterigidae
- Genus: Herlinda
- Species: H. fasciola

Binomial name
- Herlinda fasciola J. F. G. Clarke, 1986

Species of moth

Herlinda fasciola is a moth in the family Cosmopterigidae. It was described by John Frederick Gates Clarke in 1986. It is found on the Marquesas Islands in French Polynesia.
