= Neomelanesthes disema =

Scientific classification
- Kingdom: Animalia
- Phylum: Arthropoda
- Class: Insecta
- Order: Lepidoptera
- Family: Cosmopterigidae
- Genus: Neomelanesthes
- Species: N. disema

Binomial name
- Neomelanesthes disema (Diakonoff, 1954)

Synonyms
- Melanesthes disema Diakonoff, 1954

Species of moth

Neomelanesthes disema is a moth in the family Cosmopterigidae. It is found in New Guinea.
