= Colonophora cateiata =

Scientific classification
- Kingdom: Animalia
- Phylum: Arthropoda
- Class: Insecta
- Order: Lepidoptera
- Family: Cosmopterigidae
- Genus: Colonophora
- Species: C. cateiata

Binomial name
- Colonophora cateiata Meyrick, 1914

Species of moth

Colonophora cateiata is a moth in the family Cosmopterigidae. It is found in Malawi.
