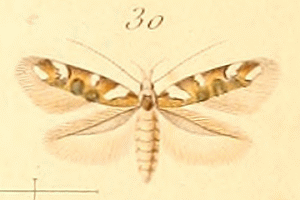

Scientific classification
- Domain: Eukaryota
- Kingdom: Animalia
- Phylum: Arthropoda
- Class: Insecta
- Order: Lepidoptera
- Family: Cosmopterigidae
- Genus: Isidiella
- Species: I. divitella

Binomial name
- Isidiella divitella (Constant, 1885)

Synonyms
- Stagmatophora divitella Constant, 1885; Stagmatophora tyrrhenica Amsel, 1939

= Isidiella divitella =

Species of moth

Isidiella divitella is a moth in the family Cosmopterigidae. It is found in France, on the Iberian Peninsula, Corsica and Sardinia.

The wingspan is 11–12 mm.

The larvae feed on Helichrysum italicum, Helichrysum italicum serotinum, Helichrysum stoechas and Santolina species. They mine the leaves of their host plant. Larvae can be found from July to August.
