= Persicoptila aesthetica =

Scientific classification
- Kingdom: Animalia
- Phylum: Arthropoda
- Class: Insecta
- Order: Lepidoptera
- Family: Cosmopterigidae
- Genus: Persicoptila
- Species: P. aesthetica

Binomial name
- Persicoptila aesthetica Meyrick, 1927

Species of moth

Persicoptila aesthetica is a moth in the family Cosmopterigidae. It is found on Samoa.
