= Persicoptila erythrota =

Scientific classification
- Kingdom: Animalia
- Phylum: Arthropoda
- Class: Insecta
- Order: Lepidoptera
- Family: Cosmopterigidae
- Genus: Persicoptila
- Species: P. erythrota

Binomial name
- Persicoptila erythrota Meyrick, 1886

Species of moth

Persicoptila erythrota is a moth in the family Cosmopterigidae. It is found on the New Hebrides.
