= Homosaces podarga =

Scientific classification
- Kingdom: Animalia
- Phylum: Arthropoda
- Class: Insecta
- Order: Lepidoptera
- Family: Cosmopterigidae
- Genus: Homosaces
- Species: H. podarga

Binomial name
- Homosaces podarga Meyrick, 1914

Species of moth

Homosaces podarga is a moth in the family Cosmopterigidae. It is found in India.
