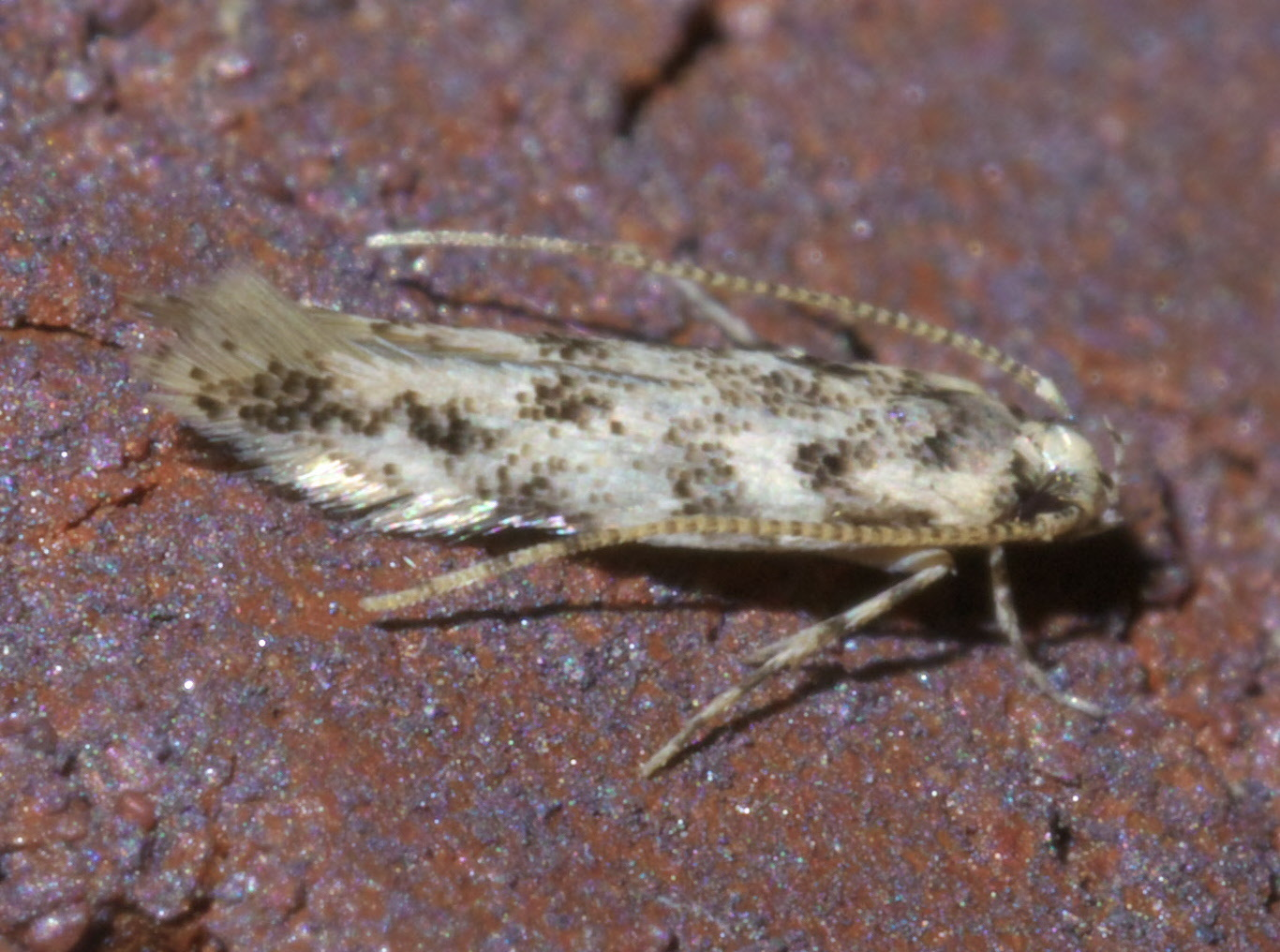
- In Oklahoma, US

Scientific classification
- Kingdom: Animalia
- Phylum: Arthropoda
- Clade: Pancrustacea
- Class: Insecta
- Order: Lepidoptera
- Family: Cosmopterigidae
- Subfamily: Cosmopteriginae
- Genus: Melanocinclis
- Species: M. sparsa

Binomial name
- Melanocinclis sparsa Hodges, 1978

= Melanocinclis sparsa =

Species of moth

Melanocinclis sparsa is a species of cosmet moth in the family Cosmopterigidae. It is found in the United States, east of the Rocky Mountains.

The wingspan is about 7 mm. Adults have been recorded from May to June and in August.
