= Homosaces sanctificata =

Scientific classification
- Kingdom: Animalia
- Phylum: Arthropoda
- Class: Insecta
- Order: Lepidoptera
- Family: Cosmopterigidae
- Genus: Homosaces
- Species: H. sanctificata

Binomial name
- Homosaces sanctificata (Meyrick, 1936)

Synonyms
- Cryptolechia sanctificata Meyrick, 1936

Species of moth

Homosaces sanctificata is a moth in the family Cosmopterigidae. It is found in India.
