= Calycobathra variapenella =

Scientific classification
- Kingdom: Animalia
- Phylum: Arthropoda
- Clade: Pancrustacea
- Class: Insecta
- Order: Lepidoptera
- Family: Cosmopterigidae
- Genus: Calycobathra
- Species: C. variapenella

Binomial name
- Calycobathra variapenella Sinev, 1984

Species of moth

Calycobathra variapenella is a moth in the family Cosmopterigidae. It is found in Turkey, the northern Caucasus, Transcaucasia and Central Asia.

The wingspan is 10–11 mm. Adults are on wing from May to July.
