= Antequera acertella =

Scientific classification
- Kingdom: Animalia
- Phylum: Arthropoda
- Class: Insecta
- Order: Lepidoptera
- Family: Cosmopterigidae
- Genus: Antequera
- Species: A. acertella

Binomial name
- Antequera acertella (Busck, 1913)

Synonyms
- Semioscopis acertella Busck, 1913; Borkhausenia exstimulata Meyrick, 1928

Species of moth

Antequera acertella is a moth in the family Cosmopterigidae. It was described by August Busck in 1913. It is found in California and Baja California.
