= Persicoptila picrodes =

Scientific classification
- Kingdom: Animalia
- Phylum: Arthropoda
- Class: Insecta
- Order: Lepidoptera
- Family: Cosmopterigidae
- Genus: Persicoptila
- Species: P. picrodes

Binomial name
- Persicoptila picrodes Meyrick, 1915

Species of moth

Persicoptila picrodes is a moth in the family Cosmopterigidae. It is found in India.
