= Isidiella nickerlii =

Scientific classification
- Domain: Eukaryota
- Kingdom: Animalia
- Phylum: Arthropoda
- Class: Insecta
- Order: Lepidoptera
- Family: Cosmopterigidae
- Genus: Isidiella
- Species: I. nickerlii

Binomial name
- Isidiella nickerlii (Nickerl, 1864)

Synonyms
- Stagmatophora nickerlii Nickerl, 1864; Isidiella nickerli

Species of moth

Isidiella nickerlii is a moth in the family Cosmopterigidae. It is found in France, on the Iberian Peninsula and in Switzerland, Austria, Italy, the Czech Republic, Hungary, Romania and North Macedonia.
