= Calycobathra calligoni =

Scientific classification
- Kingdom: Animalia
- Phylum: Arthropoda
- Clade: Pancrustacea
- Class: Insecta
- Order: Lepidoptera
- Family: Cosmopterigidae
- Genus: Calycobathra
- Species: C. calligoni

Binomial name
- Calycobathra calligoni Sinev, 1979

Species of moth

Calycobathra calligoni is a moth in the family Cosmopterigidae. The moth is found in south-eastern part of European Russia (eastern Caucasus and southern Ural), Transcaucasia and Central Asia. The wingspan is 10–12 mm. There are two generations per year with adults on wing year round. Overwintering takes place in rodent nests.

The larvae feed on the shoots and fruit of Calligonum junceum, Calligonum eriopodum, Calligonum microcarpum and Calligonum leucoladum. They can be found from late spring to the first half of summer.
