= Hodgesiella rhodorrhisella =

Scientific classification
- Domain: Eukaryota
- Kingdom: Animalia
- Phylum: Arthropoda
- Class: Insecta
- Order: Lepidoptera
- Family: Cosmopterigidae
- Genus: Hodgesiella
- Species: H. rhodorrhisella

Binomial name
- Hodgesiella rhodorrhisella (Kasy, 1970)

Synonyms
- Stagmatophora rhodorrhisella Kasy, 1970

Species of moth

Hodgesiella rhodorrhisella is a moth in the family Cosmopterigidae. It is found on the Canary Islands.

The wingspan is 10.6–11 mm.

The larvae feed on Convolvulus floridus. They mine the leaves of their host plant.
