= Ashibusa jezoensis =

Scientific classification
- Kingdom: Animalia
- Phylum: Arthropoda
- Class: Insecta
- Order: Lepidoptera
- Family: Cosmopterigidae
- Genus: Ashibusa
- Species: A. jezoensis

Binomial name
- Ashibusa jezoensis Matsumura, 1931

Synonyms
- Pyroderces semicoccinea Stainton, 1859; Cosmopteryx semicoccinea; Labdia semicoccinae

Species of moth

Ashibusa jezoensis is a moth of the family Cosmopterigidae. It is found in Japan, Taiwan and on the Kuriles.

The wingspan is about 15 mm.
