= Tolliella truncatula =

Scientific classification
- Domain: Eukaryota
- Kingdom: Animalia
- Phylum: Arthropoda
- Class: Insecta
- Order: Lepidoptera
- Family: Cosmopterigidae
- Genus: Tolliella
- Species: T. truncatula

Binomial name
- Tolliella truncatula Z.W. Zhang & H.H. Li, 2009

Species of moth

Tolliella truncatula is a moth of the family Cosmopterigidae. It is found in Henan, China.

The wingspan is about 18 mm.
