= Falcatariella catalaiella =

Scientific classification
- Kingdom: Animalia
- Phylum: Arthropoda
- Class: Insecta
- Order: Lepidoptera
- Family: Cosmopterigidae
- Genus: Falcatariella
- Species: F. catalaiella

Binomial name
- Falcatariella catalaiella Viette, 1949

Species of moth

Falcatariella catalaiella is a moth in the family Cosmopterigidae. It is found in Madagascar.

This species has a wingspan of 36mm, winglength of 17mm and was named after Mr. Réné Catala.
