= Idiostyla oculata =

Scientific classification
- Kingdom: Animalia
- Phylum: Arthropoda
- Class: Insecta
- Order: Lepidoptera
- Family: Cosmopterigidae
- Genus: Idiostyla
- Species: I. oculata

Binomial name
- Idiostyla oculata Meyrick, 1921

Species of moth

Idiostyla oculata is a moth in the family Cosmopterigidae. It is found on Fiji.
