= Dorodoca anthophoba =

Scientific classification
- Kingdom: Animalia
- Phylum: Arthropoda
- Class: Insecta
- Order: Lepidoptera
- Family: Cosmopterigidae
- Genus: Dorodoca
- Species: D. anthophoba

Binomial name
- Dorodoca anthophoba Ghesquière, 1940

Species of moth

Dorodoca anthophoba is a moth in the family Cosmopterigidae. It is found in the Democratic Republic of Congo.

The larvae feed on the flowers of Piptadenia africana and Entada abyssinica.
