= Ressia quercidentella =

Scientific classification
- Kingdom: Animalia
- Phylum: Arthropoda
- Clade: Pancrustacea
- Class: Insecta
- Order: Lepidoptera
- Family: Cosmopterigidae
- Genus: Ressia
- Species: R. quercidentella

Binomial name
- Ressia quercidentella Sinev, 1988

Species of moth

Ressia quercidentella is a moth in the family Cosmopterigidae. It is found in China (Henan, Tianjin), Korea and the Russian Far East.

The wingspan is 10–11.5 mm.
