= Calycobathra sahidanella =

Scientific classification
- Kingdom: Animalia
- Phylum: Arthropoda
- Class: Insecta
- Order: Lepidoptera
- Family: Cosmopterigidae
- Genus: Calycobathra
- Species: C. sahidanella

Binomial name
- Calycobathra sahidanella Kasy, 1968

Species of moth

Calycobathra sahidanella is a moth in the family Cosmopterigidae. It was described by Kasy in 1968. It is found in south-eastern Iran.

The wingspan is 8.3-10.5 mm. Adults have been recorded on wing in mid-May.
