= Pseudascalenia riadella =

Scientific classification
- Kingdom: Animalia
- Phylum: Arthropoda
- Class: Insecta
- Order: Lepidoptera
- Family: Cosmopterigidae
- Genus: Pseudascalenia
- Species: P. riadella

Binomial name
- Pseudascalenia riadella Kasy, 1968

Species of moth

Pseudascalenia riadella is a moth in the family Cosmopterigidae. It is found in Egypt, Saudi Arabia and the United Arab Emirates.
