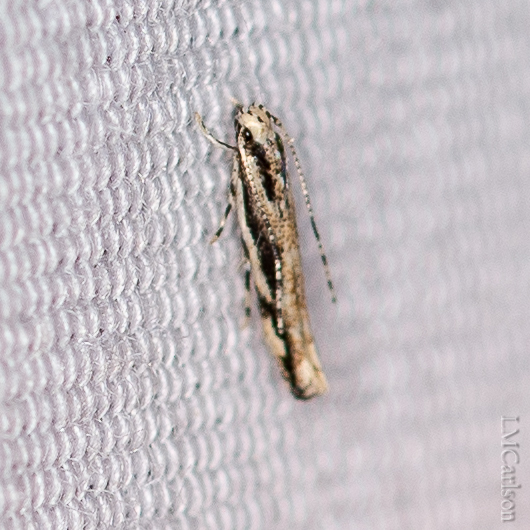
- In North Carolina, US

Scientific classification
- Kingdom: Animalia
- Phylum: Arthropoda
- Clade: Pancrustacea
- Class: Insecta
- Order: Lepidoptera
- Family: Cosmopterigidae
- Subfamily: Cosmopteriginae
- Genus: Melanocinclis
- Species: M. lineigera

Binomial name
- Melanocinclis lineigera Hodges, 1962

= Melanocinclis lineigera =

Species of moth

Melanocinclis lineigera is a species of cosmet moth in the family Cosmopterigidae. It is found mainly in eastern North America, ranging from Texas to New England.
