= Homosaces nyctiphronas =

Scientific classification
- Kingdom: Animalia
- Phylum: Arthropoda
- Class: Insecta
- Order: Lepidoptera
- Family: Cosmopterigidae
- Genus: Homosaces
- Species: H. nyctiphronas

Binomial name
- Homosaces nyctiphronas (Meyrick, 1931)

Synonyms
- Cryptolechia nyctiphronas Meyrick, 1931

Species of moth from India

Homosaces nyctiphronas is a moth in the family Cosmopterigidae. It is found in India.
