= Pseudascalenia abbasella =

Scientific classification
- Kingdom: Animalia
- Phylum: Arthropoda
- Class: Insecta
- Order: Lepidoptera
- Family: Cosmopterigidae
- Genus: Pseudascalenia
- Species: P. abbasella

Binomial name
- Pseudascalenia abbasella Kasy, 1975

Species of moth

Pseudascalenia abbasella is a moth in the family Cosmopterigidae. It is found in Iran.
