= Sindicola squamella =

Scientific classification
- Kingdom: Animalia
- Phylum: Arthropoda
- Class: Insecta
- Order: Lepidoptera
- Family: Cosmopterigidae
- Genus: Sindicola
- Species: S. squamella

Binomial name
- Sindicola squamella Amsel, 1968

Species of moth

Sindicola squamella is a moth in the family Cosmopterigidae. It is found in Pakistan.
