= Persicoptila anthophyes =

Scientific classification
- Domain: Eukaryota
- Kingdom: Animalia
- Phylum: Arthropoda
- Class: Insecta
- Order: Lepidoptera
- Family: Cosmopterigidae
- Genus: Persicoptila
- Species: P. anthophyes

Binomial name
- Persicoptila anthophyes Turner, 1926

Species of moth

Persicoptila anthophyes is a moth in the family Cosmopterigidae. It is found in Australia, where it has been recorded from Queensland.
