= Persicoptila aquilifera =

Scientific classification
- Kingdom: Animalia
- Phylum: Arthropoda
- Class: Insecta
- Order: Lepidoptera
- Family: Cosmopterigidae
- Genus: Persicoptila
- Species: P. aquilifera

Binomial name
- Persicoptila aquilifera Meyrick, 1932

Species of moth

Persicoptila aquilifera is a moth in the family Cosmopterigidae. It is found on Fiji.
