= Aganoptila phanarcha =

Scientific classification
- Kingdom: Animalia
- Phylum: Arthropoda
- Class: Insecta
- Order: Lepidoptera
- Family: Cosmopterigidae
- Genus: Aganoptila
- Species: A. phanarcha

Binomial name
- Aganoptila phanarcha Meyrick, 1915

Species of moth

Aganoptila phanarcha is a moth in the family Cosmopterigidae. It was described by Edward Meyrick in 1915. It is found in Sri Lanka.
