= Calycobathra striatella =

Scientific classification
- Kingdom: Animalia
- Phylum: Arthropoda
- Class: Insecta
- Order: Lepidoptera
- Family: Cosmopterigidae
- Genus: Calycobathra
- Species: C. striatella

Binomial name
- Calycobathra striatella Kasy, 1968

Species of moth

Calycobathra striatella is a moth in the family Cosmopterigidae. It was described by Kasy in 1968. It is found in Saudi Arabia and Palestine.
