= Persicoptila anthomima =

Scientific classification
- Kingdom: Animalia
- Phylum: Arthropoda
- Class: Insecta
- Order: Lepidoptera
- Family: Cosmopterigidae
- Genus: Persicoptila
- Species: P. anthomima

Binomial name
- Persicoptila anthomima Meyrick, 1921

Species of moth

Persicoptila anthomima is a moth in the family Cosmopterigidae. It is found on Fiji.
