= Persicoptila libanotris =

Scientific classification
- Kingdom: Animalia
- Phylum: Arthropoda
- Class: Insecta
- Order: Lepidoptera
- Family: Cosmopterigidae
- Genus: Persicoptila
- Species: P. libanotris

Binomial name
- Persicoptila libanotris Meyrick, 1906

Species of moth

Persicoptila libanotris is a moth in the family Cosmopterigidae. It is found in Sri Lanka.
