= Homosaces pelochares =

Scientific classification
- Kingdom: Animalia
- Phylum: Arthropoda
- Class: Insecta
- Order: Lepidoptera
- Family: Cosmopterigidae
- Genus: Homosaces
- Species: H. pelochares

Binomial name
- Homosaces pelochares (Meyrick, 1934)

Synonyms
- Cryptolechia pelochares Meyrick, 1934

Species of moth

Homosaces pelochares is a moth in the family Cosmopterigidae. It is found on Java.

The larvae feed on the leaves of Planchonia valida.
