= Ressia didesmococcusphaga =

Scientific classification
- Domain: Eukaryota
- Kingdom: Animalia
- Phylum: Arthropoda
- Class: Insecta
- Order: Lepidoptera
- Family: Cosmopterigidae
- Genus: Ressia
- Species: R. didesmococcusphaga

Binomial name
- Ressia didesmococcusphaga (Yang, 1977)

Synonyms
- Pancalia didesmococcusphaga Yang, 1977

Species of moth

Ressia didesmococcusphaga is a moth in the family Cosmopterigidae. It is found in China.
