= Persicoptila phoenoxantha =

Scientific classification
- Kingdom: Animalia
- Phylum: Arthropoda
- Class: Insecta
- Order: Lepidoptera
- Family: Cosmopterigidae
- Genus: Persicoptila
- Species: P. phoenoxantha

Binomial name
- Persicoptila phoenoxantha Meyrick, 1923

Species of moth

Persicoptila phoenoxantha is a moth in the family Cosmopterigidae. It is found on Fiji.
