= Teladoma exigua =

Scientific classification
- Kingdom: Animalia
- Phylum: Arthropoda
- Clade: Pancrustacea
- Class: Insecta
- Order: Lepidoptera
- Family: Cosmopterigidae
- Genus: Teladoma
- Species: T. exigua

Binomial name
- Teladoma exigua Hodges, 1978

Species of moth

Teladoma exigua is a moth in the family Cosmopterigidae. It is found in North America, where it has been recorded from California and Arizona.
