= Tetraconta =

Scientific classification
- Kingdom: Animalia
- Phylum: Arthropoda
- Class: Insecta
- Order: Lepidoptera
- Family: Cosmopterigidae
- Subfamily: Cosmopteriginae
- Genus: Tetraconta; Turner, 1932
- Species: T. clepsimorpha

Binomial name
- Tetraconta clepsimorpha Turner, 1932

Genus of moths

Tetraconta is a genus of moths in the family Cosmopterigidae. It contains only one species, Tetraconta clepsimorpha, which is found in Australia (Queensland).
