= Antequera (moth) =

Scientific classification
- Kingdom: Animalia
- Phylum: Arthropoda
- Class: Insecta
- Order: Lepidoptera
- Family: Cosmopterigidae
- Subfamily: Antequerinae
- Genus: Antequera; J.F.G. Clarke, 1941

Genus of moths

Antequera is a genus of moth in the family Cosmopterigidae.

== Species ==
- Antequera acertella (Busck, 1913)
- Antequera exstimulata
