= Morphotica =

Scientific classification
- Kingdom: Animalia
- Phylum: Arthropoda
- Class: Insecta
- Order: Lepidoptera
- Family: Cosmopterigidae
- Subfamily: Cosmopteriginae
- Genus: Morphotica; Meyrick, 1915
- Species: M. mirifica

Binomial name
- Morphotica mirifica Meyrick, 1915

Genus of moths

Morphotica is a genus of moths in the family Cosmopterigidae. It contains only one species, Morphotica mirifica, which is found in northern Australia.
