= Lamachaera =

Scientific classification
- Kingdom: Animalia
- Phylum: Arthropoda
- Class: Insecta
- Order: Lepidoptera
- Family: Cosmopterigidae
- Genus: Lamachaera; Meyrick, 1915
- Species: L. cyanacma

Binomial name
- Lamachaera cyanacma Meyrick, 1915

Genus of moths

Lamachaera is a genus of moths in the family Cosmopterigidae. It contains only one species, Lamachaera cyanacma, which is found in the Philippines.
