= Cosmiosophista =

Scientific classification
- Domain: Eukaryota
- Kingdom: Animalia
- Phylum: Arthropoda
- Class: Insecta
- Order: Lepidoptera
- Family: Cosmopterigidae
- Subfamily: Antequerinae
- Genus: Cosmiosophista; A.N. Diakonoff, 1954
- Species: C. trachyopa

Binomial name
- Cosmiosophista trachyopa Diakonoff, 1954

Genus of moths

Cosmiosophista is a genus of moth in the family Cosmopterigidae. It consists of only one species, Cosmiosophista trachyopa, which is found in New Guinea.
