= Neomelanesthes =

Scientific classification
- Kingdom: Animalia
- Phylum: Arthropoda
- Class: Insecta
- Order: Lepidoptera
- Family: Cosmopterigidae
- Genus: Neomelanesthes; Özdikmen, 2008

Synonyms
- Melanesthes Diakonoff, 1954 (preocc. Dejean, 1834)

Genus of moths

Neomelanesthes is a genus of moths in the family Cosmopterigidae.

== Species ==
- Neomelanesthes atopa (Bradley, 1959)
- Neomelanesthes disema (Diakonoff, 1954)

== Etymology ==
The genus name refers to the preexisting genus name Melanesthes in the family Tenebrionidae (Coleoptera).
