= Streptothyris =

Scientific classification
- Kingdom: Animalia
- Phylum: Arthropoda
- Class: Insecta
- Order: Lepidoptera
- Family: Cosmopterigidae
- Subfamily: Scaeosophinae
- Genus: Streptothyris; Meyrick, 1918

Genus of moths

Streptothyris is a genus of moth in the family Cosmopterigidae.

== Species ==
- Streptothyris tanyacta Meyrick, 1918
