= Herlinda =

Scientific classification
- Kingdom: Animalia
- Phylum: Arthropoda
- Clade: Pancrustacea
- Class: Insecta
- Order: Lepidoptera
- Family: Cosmopterigidae
- Genus: Herlinda; J.F.G.Clarke, 1986

Type species
- Herlinda phaeoxantha J.F.G.Clarke, 1986

Diversity
- 4 species

Genus of moths

Herlinda is a genus of cosmet moths (family Cosmopterigidae). These moths were only discovered in 1968 and the genus was not described until 1986; its affiliations within the family are presently unknown (but see below). This genus, as far as is known, is endemic to the Marquesas Islands of Polynesia, with each species confined to a single island.

They are small moths and resemble Microzestis, a possible close relative. However, the forewing vein 1b of Herlinda is not forked like in Microzestis, and the forewing 1c is missing in Herlinda. They also resemble Iressa of subfamily Cosmopteriginae in some anatomical details, but unlike in that genus, the forewing veins 2 and 3 are united in Herlinda. The genitals are convergent in structure with those of the Agonoxenidae genus Asymphorodes, which was mistakenly placed in the Cosmopterigidae.

== Description and ecology ==
The head is covered with a smooth layer of scales; the antennae are about 80% of the forewing length and serrated in males but smooth in females; the scape is combed. The labial palps are upturned and diverge, but do not reach the vertex; their second and third segments are of roughly equal length, the former being somewhat rough at the distal end and the latter pointed. They lack ocelli. The thorax is smooth, while the hindleg tibia has a rough surface formed by hair-like scales. The genitals of the males are asymmetric, in those of the females the signum is missing.

The forewing is likewise smooth; it has 11 veins, with veins 1c and 5 missing (the latter is sometimes present, but almost invisible) and 2 and 3 united. Vein 1b is not forked, and vein 4 not connected to 2/3; veins 6/7 arise from vein 8 with a stalk, the seventh reaching the leading edge of the wing slightly before the wingtip. Vein 8 either approaches vein 9 at the base or tapers out. Vein 10 originates significantly before 9, and vein 11 starts at the middle of the wing cell. The hindwings have 8 veins, but 2-5 are very weak. Hindwing veins 6/7 are stalked, and the latter reaches the leading edge. On the underside of the males' hindwings, there is a brush of elongated hairs, which fits into a fold along the wing cell.

The ecology of these moths remains almost completely unknown. They seem to be primarily found in the lowlands, where the vegetation is heavily influenced by human activity. Notable plants from these moths' habitat include Artocarpus species, Papaya (Carica papaya), Coconut (Cocos nucifera), Sea Hibiscus (Hibiscus tiliaceus), Indian Mango (Mangifera indica), Musa (bananas), Thatch Screwpine (Pandanus tectorius), the paspalum grass Paspalum paniculatum, Apple Guava (Psidium guajava), Tamarind (Tamarindus indica), Portia Tree (Thespesia populnea), as well as Cyperaceae sedges, lichens and mosses. It is unlikely, however, that these moths use the non-native species as foodplants.

== Species ==
This genus contains only 4 known species:

- Herlinda fasciola J.F.G. Clarke, 1986
- Herlinda iota J.F.G. Clarke, 1986
- Herlinda oligoria J.F.G. Clarke, 1986
- Herlinda phaeoxantha J.F.G. Clarke, 1986
