= Helicacma =

Scientific classification
- Kingdom: Animalia
- Phylum: Arthropoda
- Class: Insecta
- Order: Lepidoptera
- Family: Cosmopterigidae
- Subfamily: Scaeosophinae
- Genus: Helicacma; Meyrick, 1914
- Species: H. catapasta

Binomial name
- Helicacma catapasta Meyrick, 1914

Genus of moths

Helicacma is a genus of moth in the family Cosmopterigidae. It contains only one species, Helicacma catapasta, which is found in India (Assam).
