= Isostreptis =

Scientific classification
- Kingdom: Animalia
- Phylum: Arthropoda
- Class: Insecta
- Order: Lepidoptera
- Family: Cosmopterigidae
- Subfamily: Scaeosophinae
- Genus: Isostreptis; Meyrick, 1934
- Species: I. porphyrarga

Binomial name
- Isostreptis porphyrarga Meyrick, 1934

Genus of moths

Isostreptis is a genus of moth in the family Cosmopterigidae. It contains only one species, Isostreptis porphyrarga, which is found in China.
