= Protogrypa =

Scientific classification
- Kingdom: Animalia
- Phylum: Arthropoda
- Class: Insecta
- Order: Lepidoptera
- Family: Cosmopterigidae
- Subfamily: Scaeosophinae
- Genus: Protogrypa; Meyrick, 1914
- Species: P. citromicta

Binomial name
- Protogrypa citromicta Meyrick, 1914

Genus of moths

Protogrypa is a genus of moth in the family Cosmopterigidae. It contains only one species, Protogrypa citromicta, which is found in Sri Lanka.
