= Neachandella =

Scientific classification
- Kingdom: Animalia
- Phylum: Arthropoda
- Class: Insecta
- Order: Lepidoptera
- Family: Cosmopterigidae
- Genus: Neachandella; Diakonoff, 1954
- Species: N. desis

Binomial name
- Neachandella desis Diakonoff, 1954

Genus of moths

Neachandella is a genus of moth in the family Cosmopterigidae. It contains only one species, Neachandella desis, which is found in New Guinea.
