= Parathystas =

Scientific classification
- Kingdom: Animalia
- Phylum: Arthropoda
- Class: Insecta
- Order: Lepidoptera
- Family: Cosmopterigidae
- Subfamily: Cosmopteriginae
- Genus: Parathystas; Meyrick, 1913
- Species: P. porphyrantha

Binomial name
- Parathystas porphyrantha Meyrick, 1913

Genus of moths

Parathystas is a genus of moths in the family Cosmopterigidae. It contains only one species, Parathystas porphyrantha, which is found in South Africa.
