= Persicoptila =

Scientific classification
- Kingdom: Animalia
- Phylum: Arthropoda
- Class: Insecta
- Order: Lepidoptera
- Family: Cosmopterigidae
- Subfamily: Cosmopteriginae
- Genus: Persicoptila; Meyrick, 1886

Genus of moths

Persicoptila is a genus of moths in the family Cosmopterigidae.

== Species ==
- Persicoptila acrostigma
- Persicoptila aesthetica
- Persicoptila anthomima
- Persicoptila anthophyes
- Persicoptila aquilifera
- Persicoptila arenosa Turner, 1917
- Persicoptila chiasta
- Persicoptila dasysceles Turner, 1917
- Persicoptila erythrota
- Persicoptila eurytricha
- Persicoptila haemanthes
- Persicoptila heliatma
- Persicoptila heroica
- Persicoptila hesperis Meyrick, 1897
- Persicoptila leucosarca
- Persicoptila libanotris
- Persicoptila meliteucta
- Persicoptila mimochora Meyrick, 1897
- Persicoptila oenosceles Turner, 1917
- Persicoptila oriaula
- Persicoptila peltias Meyrick, 1897
- Persicoptila petrinopa
- Persicoptila phoenoxantha
- Persicoptila phronimopis
- Persicoptila picrodes
- Persicoptila ramulosa
- Persicoptila rhipidaspis
- Persicoptila rhodocnemis Meyrick, 1915
- Persicoptila scholarcha
- Persicoptila tritozona Turner, 1917
- Persicoptila vinosa
