= Ischnangela =

Scientific classification
- Kingdom: Animalia
- Phylum: Arthropoda
- Class: Insecta
- Order: Lepidoptera
- Family: Cosmopterigidae
- Genus: Ischnangela; Meyrick, 1933
- Species: I. eremocentra

Binomial name
- Ischnangela eremocentra Meyrick, 1933

Genus of moths

Ischnangela is a genus of moth in the family Cosmopterigidae. It contains only one species, Ischnangela eremocentra, which is found on Java.

The wingspan of Ischnangela eremocentra is 7–8 mm (0.28–0.31 in) based on the type series (two females).
