= Pauroptila =

Scientific classification
- Kingdom: Animalia
- Phylum: Arthropoda
- Class: Insecta
- Order: Lepidoptera
- Family: Cosmopterigidae
- Genus: Pauroptila; Meyrick, 1913
- Species: P. galenitis

Binomial name
- Pauroptila galenitis Meyrick, 1913

Genus of moths

Pauroptila is a genus of moths in the family Cosmopterigidae. It contains only one species, Pauroptila galenitis, which is found in South Africa.
