= Ambonostola =

Scientific classification
- Kingdom: Animalia
- Phylum: Arthropoda
- Class: Insecta
- Order: Lepidoptera
- Family: Elachistidae
- Subfamily: Agonoxeninae
- Genus: Ambonostola; Meyrick, 1935

Genus of moths

Ambonostola is a genus of moths in the family Agonoxenidae with a single species, A. phosphoropis.

== Species ==
- Ambonostola phosphoropis Meyrick, 1935
