= Synploca =

Scientific classification
- Kingdom: Animalia
- Phylum: Arthropoda
- Clade: Pancrustacea
- Class: Insecta
- Order: Lepidoptera
- Family: Cosmopterigidae
- Subfamily: Cosmopteriginae
- Genus: Synploca; Hodges, 1964
- Species: S. gumia

Binomial name
- Synploca gumia Hodges, 1964

Genus of moths

Synploca is a genus of moth in the family Cosmopterigidae. It contains only one species, Synploca gumia, which is found in North America, where it has been recorded from Arizona and Texas.
