= Phosphaticola =

Scientific classification
- Kingdom: Animalia
- Phylum: Arthropoda
- Class: Insecta
- Order: Lepidoptera
- Family: Cosmopterigidae
- Subfamily: Antequerinae
- Genus: Phosphaticola; Viette, 1951
- Species: P. gemmatella

Binomial name
- Phosphaticola gemmatella Viette, 1951

Genus of moths

Phosphaticola is a genus of moths in the family Cosmopterigidae. It contains only one species, Phosphaticola gemmatella, which is found in Tunisia.

The wingspan is 11–12 mm. Adults have been recorded in February.
