= Haplophylax =

Scientific classification
- Kingdom: Animalia
- Phylum: Arthropoda
- Class: Insecta
- Order: Lepidoptera
- Family: Cosmopterigidae
- Genus: Haplophylax; Meyrick, 1932
- Species: H. paraphanes

Binomial name
- Haplophylax paraphanes Meyrick, 1932

Genus of moths

Haplophylax is a genus of moth in the family Cosmopterigidae. It contains only one species, Haplophylax paraphanes, which is found in India.
