= Tanygona =

Scientific classification
- Kingdom: Animalia
- Phylum: Arthropoda
- Class: Insecta
- Order: Lepidoptera
- Family: Cosmopterigidae
- Subfamily: Cosmopteriginae
- Genus: Tanygona; Braun, 1923
- Species: T. lignicolorella

Binomial name
- Tanygona lignicolorella Braun, 1923

Genus of moths

Tanygona is a genus of moth in the family Cosmopterigidae. It contains only one species, Tanygona lignicolorella, which is found in North America, where it has been recorded from Arkansas, Florida, Illinois, Indiana, Kentucky, Maryland, Massachusetts, Mississippi, North Carolina, Ohio, South Carolina and Tennessee.

The wingspan is about 8 mm. Adults are on wing from April to August.
