= Aphanosara =

Scientific classification
- Kingdom: Animalia
- Phylum: Arthropoda
- Clade: Pancrustacea
- Class: Insecta
- Order: Lepidoptera
- Family: Cosmopterigidae
- Subfamily: Cosmopteriginae
- Genus: Aphanosara; Forbes, 1931
- Species: A. planistes

Binomial name
- Aphanosara planistes Forbes, 1931

Genus of moths

Aphanosara is a genus of moth in the family Cosmopterigidae. It contains only one species, Aphanosara planistes, which is found in Puerto Rico.
