= Crobylophanes =

Scientific classification
- Kingdom: Animalia
- Phylum: Arthropoda
- Class: Insecta
- Order: Lepidoptera
- Family: Cosmopterigidae
- Genus: Crobylophanes; Meyrick, 1938
- Species: C. sericophaea

Binomial name
- Crobylophanes sericophaea Meyrick, 1938

Genus of moths

Crobylophanes is a genus of moths in the family Tineidae. It contains only one species, Crobylophanes sericophaea, which is found in Democratic Republic of Congo.
