= Melanocinclis =

- Melanocinclis sparsa

Scientific classification
- Kingdom: Animalia
- Phylum: Arthropoda
- Clade: Pancrustacea
- Class: Insecta
- Order: Lepidoptera
- Family: Cosmopterigidae
- Subfamily: Cosmopteriginae
- Genus: Melanocinclis; Hodges, 1962

Genus of moths

Melanocinclis is a genus of moths in the family Cosmopterigidae.

== Species ==
- Melanocinclis gnoma Hodges, 1978
- Melanocinclis lineigera Hodges, 1962
- Melanocinclis nigrilineella (Chambers, 1878)
- Melanocinclis sparsa Hodges, 1978
- Melanocinclis vibex Hodges, 1978
