= Calycobathra =

Scientific classification
- Kingdom: Animalia
- Phylum: Arthropoda
- Class: Insecta
- Order: Lepidoptera
- Family: Cosmopterigidae
- Genus: Calycobathra; Meyrick, 1891

Genus of moths

Calycobathra is a genus of moth in the family Cosmopterigidae.

== Species ==
- Calycobathra acarpa Meyrick, 1891
- Calycobathra arabicella Kasy, 1968
- Calycobathra calligoni Sinev, 1979
- Calycobathra pakistanella Kasy, 1968
- Calycobathra sahidanella Kasy, 1968
- Calycobathra striatella Kasy, 1968
- Calycobathra variapenella Sinev, 1984
