= Diversivalva =

Scientific classification
- Kingdom: Animalia
- Phylum: Arthropoda
- Clade: Pancrustacea
- Class: Insecta
- Order: Lepidoptera
- Family: Cosmopterigidae
- Subfamily: Cosmopteriginae
- Genus: Diversivalva; Sinev, 1991
- Species: D. minutella

Binomial name
- Diversivalva minutella Sinev, 1991

Genus of moths

Diversivalva is a genus of moths in the family Cosmopterigidae. It contains only one species, Diversivalva minutella, which is found in Russia.
