= Protorhiza =

Scientific classification
- Kingdom: Animalia
- Phylum: Arthropoda
- Class: Insecta
- Order: Lepidoptera
- Family: Cosmopterigidae
- Genus: Protorhiza; Diakonoff, 1968
- Species: P. cyanosticta

Binomial name
- Protorhiza cyanosticta Diakonoff, 1967

Synonyms
- Syntomaula cyanosticta

Genus of moths

Protorhiza is a genus of moth in the family Cosmopterigidae. It contains only one species, Protorhiza cyanosticta, which is found in the Philippines (Luzon).
