= Griphocosma =

Scientific classification
- Kingdom: Animalia
- Phylum: Arthropoda
- Class: Insecta
- Order: Lepidoptera
- Family: Cosmopterigidae
- Genus: Griphocosma; T. B. Fletcher, 1929
- Species: G. citroplecta

Binomial name
- Griphocosma citroplecta (Meyrick, 1917)

Synonyms
- Microcolona citroplecta Meyrick, 1917

Genus of moths

Griphocosma is a monotypic moth genus in the family Cosmopterigidae described by Thomas Bainbrigge Fletcher in 1929. It contains only one species, Griphocosma citroplecta, described by Edward Meyrick in 1917, which is found in Busa, India.

This species has a wingspan of 8–9 mm. The forewings are pale citron yellow chequered with small olive-fuscous spots and marks.
