= Aeronectris =

Scientific classification
- Kingdom: Animalia
- Phylum: Arthropoda
- Class: Insecta
- Order: Lepidoptera
- Family: Elachistidae
- Subfamily: Agonoxeninae
- Genus: Aeronectris; Meyrick, 1917

Genus of moths

Aeronectris is a genus of moths in the family Agonoxenidae, with a single species A. euacta found in India.

== Species ==
- Aeronectris euacta Meyrick, 1917
