= Tolliella =

Scientific classification
- Domain: Eukaryota
- Kingdom: Animalia
- Phylum: Arthropoda
- Class: Insecta
- Order: Lepidoptera
- Family: Cosmopterigidae
- Subfamily: Cosmopteriginae
- Genus: Tolliella; Riedl, 1969

Genus of moths

Tolliella is a genus of moth in the family Cosmopterigidae.

== Species ==
- Tolliella fulguritella (Ragonot, 1895)
- Tolliella truncatula Z.W. Zhang & H.H. Li, 2009
