= Pycnagorastis =

Scientific classification
- Kingdom: Animalia
- Phylum: Arthropoda
- Class: Insecta
- Order: Lepidoptera
- Family: Cosmopterigidae
- Genus: Pycnagorastis; Meyrick, 1937
- Species: P. tanyopa

Binomial name
- Pycnagorastis tanyopa Meyrick, 1937

Genus of moths

Pycnagorastis is a genus of moths in the family Cosmopterigidae. It contains only one species, Pycnagorastis tanyopa, which is found in South Africa.
