= Stromatitica =

Scientific classification
- Kingdom: Animalia
- Phylum: Arthropoda
- Class: Insecta
- Order: Lepidoptera
- Family: Cosmopterigidae
- Genus: Stromatitica; Meyrick, 1931
- Species: S. chrysanthes

Binomial name
- Stromatitica chrysanthes Meyrick, 1931

Genus of moths

Stromatitica is a genus of moth in the family Cosmopterigidae. It contains only one species, Stromatitica chrysanthes, which is found on the Solomon Islands.
