= Axiarcha =

Scientific classification
- Kingdom: Animalia
- Phylum: Arthropoda
- Clade: Pancrustacea
- Class: Insecta
- Order: Lepidoptera
- Family: Cosmopterigidae
- Subfamily: Cosmopteriginae
- Genus: Axiarcha; Meyrick, 1921
- Species: A. discosema

Binomial name
- Axiarcha discosema Meyrick, 1921

Genus of moths

Axiarcha is a genus of moth in the family Cosmopterigidae. It contains only one species, Axiarcha discosema, which is found in South Africa.
