= Teladoma =

Scientific classification
- Kingdom: Animalia
- Phylum: Arthropoda
- Class: Insecta
- Order: Lepidoptera
- Family: Cosmopterigidae
- Subfamily: Cosmopteriginae
- Genus: Teladoma; Busck, 1932

Genus of moths

Teladoma is a genus of moth in the family Cosmopterigidae.

== Species ==
- Teladoma astigmatica (Meyrick, 1928)
- Teladoma exigua Hodges, 1978
- Teladoma habra Hodges, 1978
- Teladoma helianthi Busck, 1932
- Teladoma incana Hodges, 1962
- Teladoma murina Hodges, 1962
- Teladoma nebula Hodges, 1978
- Teladoma tonia Hodges, 1978
