= Schendylotis =

Scientific classification
- Kingdom: Animalia
- Phylum: Arthropoda
- Class: Insecta
- Order: Lepidoptera
- Family: Cosmopterigidae
- Genus: Schendylotis; Meyrick, 1910
- Species: S. chrysota

Binomial name
- Schendylotis chrysota Meyrick, 1910

Genus of moths

Schendylotis is a genus of moth in the family Cosmopterigidae. It contains only one species, Schendylotis chrysota, which is found in India.
