= Acleracra =

Scientific classification
- Kingdom: Animalia
- Phylum: Arthropoda
- Clade: Pancrustacea
- Class: Insecta
- Order: Lepidoptera
- Family: Cosmopterigidae
- Genus: Acleracra; Diakonoff, 1954
- Species: A. pancarphalea

Binomial name
- Acleracra pancarphalea Diakonoff, 1954

Genus of moths

Acleracra is a genus of moth in the family Cosmopterigidae. It contains only one species, Acleracra pancarphalea, which is found in New Guinea.
