= Mothonodes =

Scientific classification
- Kingdom: Animalia
- Phylum: Arthropoda
- Class: Insecta
- Order: Lepidoptera
- Family: Cosmopterigidae
- Subfamily: Cosmopteriginae
- Genus: Mothonodes; Meyrick, 1922
- Species: M. obusta

Binomial name
- Mothonodes obusta (Meyrick, 1921)

Synonyms
- Mothonica Meyrick, 1921; Mothonica obusta Meyrick, 1921

Genus of moths

Mothonodes is a genus of moths in the family Cosmopterigidae. It contains only one species, Mothonodes obusta, which is found in Australia.
