= Diatonica =

Scientific classification
- Kingdom: Animalia
- Phylum: Arthropoda
- Class: Insecta
- Order: Lepidoptera
- Family: Cosmopterigidae
- Genus: Diatonica; Meyrick, 1921
- Species: D. macrogramma

Binomial name
- Diatonica macrogramma Meyrick, 1921

Genus of moths

Diatonica is a genus of moth in the family Cosmopterigidae. It contains only one species, Diatonica macrogramma, which is found in Australia, where it has been recorded from Victoria.
