= Homosaces =

Scientific classification
- Kingdom: Animalia
- Phylum: Arthropoda
- Class: Insecta
- Order: Lepidoptera
- Family: Cosmopterigidae
- Genus: Homosaces; Meyrick, 1894

Genus of moths

Homosaces is a genus of moths in the family Cosmopterigidae.

== Species ==
- Homosaces anthocoma Meyrick, 1894
- Homosaces arvalis Meyrick, 1910
- Homosaces nyctiphronas Meyrick, 1931
- Homosaces pelochares Meyrick, 1934
- Homosaces podarga Meyrick, 1914
- Homosaces sanctificata Meyrick, 1936
