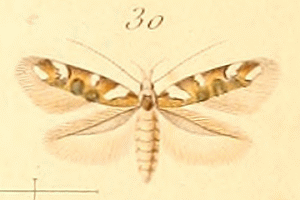
- Isidiella divitella

Scientific classification
- Domain: Eukaryota
- Kingdom: Animalia
- Phylum: Arthropoda
- Class: Insecta
- Order: Lepidoptera
- Family: Cosmopterigidae
- Genus: Isidiella; Riedl, 1965

= Isidiella =

Genus of moths

Isidiella is a genus of moths in the family Cosmopterigidae.

== Species ==
- Isidiella divitella (Constant, 1885)
- Isidiella labathiella (Viette, 1956)
- Isidiella nickerlii (Nickerl, 1864)
