= Dynatophysis =

Scientific classification
- Kingdom: Animalia
- Phylum: Arthropoda
- Class: Insecta
- Order: Lepidoptera
- Family: Cosmopterigidae
- Genus: Dynatophysis; Diakonoff, 1954
- Species: D. perichrysa

Binomial name
- Dynatophysis perichrysa Diakonoff, 1954

Genus of moths

Dynatophysis is a genus of moth in the family Cosmopterigidae. It contains only one species, Dynatophysis perichrysa, which is found in New Guinea.
