= Endograptis =

Scientific classification
- Kingdom: Animalia
- Phylum: Arthropoda
- Class: Insecta
- Order: Lepidoptera
- Family: Cosmopterigidae
- Subfamily: Cosmopteriginae
- Genus: Endograptis; Meyrick, 1927
- Species: E. pyrrhoptila

Binomial name
- Endograptis pyrrhoptila Meyrick, 1927

Genus of moths

Endograptis is a genus of moth in the family Cosmopterigidae. It contains only one species, Endograptis pyrrhoptila, which is found on Samoa.
