= Apothetodes =

Scientific classification
- Kingdom: Animalia
- Phylum: Arthropoda
- Class: Insecta
- Order: Lepidoptera
- Family: Cosmopterigidae
- Genus: Apothetodes; Meyrick, 1919
- Species: A. dialectica

Binomial name
- Apothetodes dialectica Meyrick, 1919

Genus of moths

Apothetodes is a genus of moth in the family Cosmopterigidae. It contains only one species, Apothetodes dialectica, which is found in India.
