= Falcatariella =

Scientific classification
- Kingdom: Animalia
- Phylum: Arthropoda
- Class: Insecta
- Order: Lepidoptera
- Family: Cosmopterigidae
- Genus: Falcatariella; Viette, 1949

Genus of moths

Falcatariella is a genus of moth in the family Cosmopterigidae.

== Species ==
- Falcatariella catalaiella Viette, 1949
- Falcatariella hirsutella Viette, 1967
