= Meneptila =

Scientific classification
- Kingdom: Animalia
- Phylum: Arthropoda
- Class: Insecta
- Order: Lepidoptera
- Family: Cosmopterigidae
- Genus: Meneptila; Meyrick, 1915
- Species: M. praedonia

Binomial name
- Meneptila praedonia Meyrick, 1915

Genus of moths

Meneptila is a genus of moth in the family Cosmopterigidae. It contains only one species, Meneptila praedonia, which is found in India.
