= Sematoptis =

Scientific classification
- Kingdom: Animalia
- Phylum: Arthropoda
- Class: Insecta
- Order: Lepidoptera
- Family: Cosmopterigidae
- Subfamily: Cosmopteriginae
- Genus: Sematoptis; Meyrick, 1931
- Species: S. amphilychna

Binomial name
- Sematoptis amphilychna Meyrick, 1931

Genus of moths

Sematoptis is a genus of moth in the family Cosmopterigidae. It contains only one species, Sematoptis amphilychna, which is found in Chile.
