= Ecballogonia =

Scientific classification
- Kingdom: Animalia
- Phylum: Arthropoda
- Class: Insecta
- Order: Lepidoptera
- Family: Cosmopterigidae
- Subfamily: Cosmopteriginae
- Genus: Ecballogonia; Walsingham, 1912
- Species: E. bimetallica

Binomial name
- Ecballogonia bimetallica Walsingham, 1912

Genus of moths

Ecballogonia is a genus of moth in the family Cosmopterigidae. It contains only one species, Ecballogonia bimetallica, which is found in Mexico.
