= Ramphis =

Scientific classification
- Kingdom: Animalia
- Phylum: Arthropoda
- Class: Insecta
- Order: Lepidoptera
- Family: Cosmopterigidae
- Subfamily: Cosmopteriginae
- Genus: Ramphis; Riedl, 1969

Genus of moths

Ramphis is a genus of moth in the family Cosmopterigidae.

== Species ==
- Ramphis ibericus Riedl, 1969
- Ramphis libanoticus Riedl, 1969
