= Pechyptila =

Scientific classification
- Kingdom: Animalia
- Phylum: Arthropoda
- Class: Insecta
- Order: Lepidoptera
- Family: Cosmopterigidae
- Subfamily: Cosmopteriginae
- Genus: Pechyptila; Meyrick, 1921
- Species: P. rhodocharis

Binomial name
- Pechyptila rhodocharis Meyrick, 1921

Genus of moths

Pechyptila is a genus of moth in the family Cosmopterigidae. It contains only one species, Pechyptila rhodocharis, which is found in Australia.
