= Metagrypa =

Scientific classification
- Kingdom: Animalia
- Phylum: Arthropoda
- Class: Insecta
- Order: Lepidoptera
- Family: Cosmopterigidae
- Genus: Metagrypa; Meyrick, 1933
- Species: M. tetrarrhyncha

Binomial name
- Metagrypa tetrarrhyncha Meyrick, 1933

Synonyms
- Metagrypa tetrarrhycha

Genus of moths

Metagrypa is a genus of moth in the family Cosmopterigidae. It consists of only one species, Metagrypa tetrarrhyncha, which is found in Taiwan.
