= Minivalva =

Scientific classification
- Kingdom: Animalia
- Phylum: Arthropoda
- Clade: Pancrustacea
- Class: Insecta
- Order: Lepidoptera
- Family: Cosmopterigidae
- Genus: Minivalva; Sinev, 1989
- Species: M. kondarella

Binomial name
- Minivalva kondarella Sinev, 1989

Genus of moths

Minivalva is a genus of moth in the family Cosmopterigidae. It contains only one species, Minivalva kondarella, which is found in Tajikistan.
