= Zanclarches =

Scientific classification
- Kingdom: Animalia
- Phylum: Arthropoda
- Class: Insecta
- Order: Lepidoptera
- Family: Cosmopterigidae
- Genus: Zanclarches; Meyrick, 1921
- Species: Z. fastosa

Binomial name
- Zanclarches fastosa Meyrick, 1921

Genus of moths

Zanclarches is a monotypic moth genus in the family Cosmopterigidae described by Edward Meyrick in 1921. Its only species, Zanclarches fastosa, described by the same author in the same year, is found on Java in Indonesia.
