= Urangela =

Scientific classification
- Kingdom: Animalia
- Phylum: Arthropoda
- Class: Insecta
- Order: Lepidoptera
- Family: Cosmopterigidae
- Subfamily: Cosmopteriginae
- Genus: Urangela; Busck, 1912
- Species: U. pygmaea

Binomial name
- Urangela pygmaea Busck, 1912

Genus of moths

Urangela is a monotypic moth genus in the family Cosmopterigidae described by August Busck in 1912. It contains only one species, Urangela pygmaea, described by the same author in the same year, which is found in Panama.
