= Eralea =

Scientific classification
- Kingdom: Animalia
- Phylum: Arthropoda
- Clade: Pancrustacea
- Class: Insecta
- Order: Lepidoptera
- Family: Cosmopterigidae
- Genus: Eralea; Hodges, 1962

Genus of moths

Eralea is a genus of moths in the family Cosmopterigidae.

== Species ==
- Eralea abludo Hodges, 1978
- Eralea albalineella (Chambers, 1878) (syn: Eralea striata Hodges, 1962)
