= Sindicola =

Scientific classification
- Kingdom: Animalia
- Phylum: Arthropoda
- Class: Insecta
- Order: Lepidoptera
- Family: Cosmopterigidae
- Genus: Sindicola; Amsel, 1968

Genus of moths

Sindicola is a genus of moth in the family Cosmopterigidae.

== Species ==
- Sindicola juengeri Amsel, 1968
- Sindicola squamella Amsel, 1968

== Status unknown ==
- Sindicola ussuriella Sinev
