= Hedroxena =

Scientific classification
- Kingdom: Animalia
- Phylum: Arthropoda
- Class: Insecta
- Order: Lepidoptera
- Family: Cosmopterigidae
- Genus: Hedroxena; Meyrick, 1924
- Species: H. barbara

Binomial name
- Hedroxena barbara Meyrick, 1924

Genus of moths

Hedroxena is a genus of moth in the family Cosmopterigidae. It contains only one species, Hedroxena barbara, which is found on the New Hebrides.
