= Aganoptila =

Scientific classification
- Kingdom: Animalia
- Phylum: Arthropoda
- Class: Insecta
- Order: Lepidoptera
- Family: Cosmopterigidae
- Genus: Aganoptila; Meyrick, 1915

Genus of moths

Aganoptila is a genus of moth in the family Cosmopterigidae.

== Species ==
- Aganoptila durata Meyrick, 1922
- Aganoptila phanarcha Meyrick, 1915
