= Pseudascalenia =

Scientific classification
- Kingdom: Animalia
- Phylum: Arthropoda
- Class: Insecta
- Order: Lepidoptera
- Family: Cosmopterigidae
- Genus: Pseudascalenia; Kasy, 1968

Genus of moths

Pseudascalenia is a genus of moth in the family Cosmopterigidae.

== Species ==
- Pseudascalenia abbasella Kasy, 1975
- Pseudascalenia riadella Kasy, 1968
