= Clemmatista =

Scientific classification
- Kingdom: Animalia
- Phylum: Arthropoda
- Class: Insecta
- Order: Lepidoptera
- Family: Cosmopterigidae
- Subfamily: Cosmopteriginae
- Genus: Clemmatista; Meyrick, 1921
- Species: C. metacirrha

Binomial name
- Clemmatista metacirrha Meyrick, 1921

Synonyms
- Chrysopeleia metacirrha (Meyrick, 1921); Chysopeleia metacirrha (Meyrick, 1921)

Genus of moths

Clemmatista is a monotypic moth genus in the family Cosmopterigidae. Its single species, Clemmatista metacirrha, is found in India. Both the genus and species were first described by Edward Meyrick in 1921.
