= Dromiaulis =

Scientific classification
- Kingdom: Animalia
- Phylum: Arthropoda
- Class: Insecta
- Order: Lepidoptera
- Family: Cosmopterigidae
- Subfamily: Cosmopteriginae
- Genus: Dromiaulis; Meyrick, 1922
- Species: D. excitata

Binomial name
- Dromiaulis excitata Meyrick, 1922

Genus of moths

Dromiaulis is a genus of moth in the family Cosmopterigidae. It contains only one species, Dromiaulis excitata, which is found in Peru.
