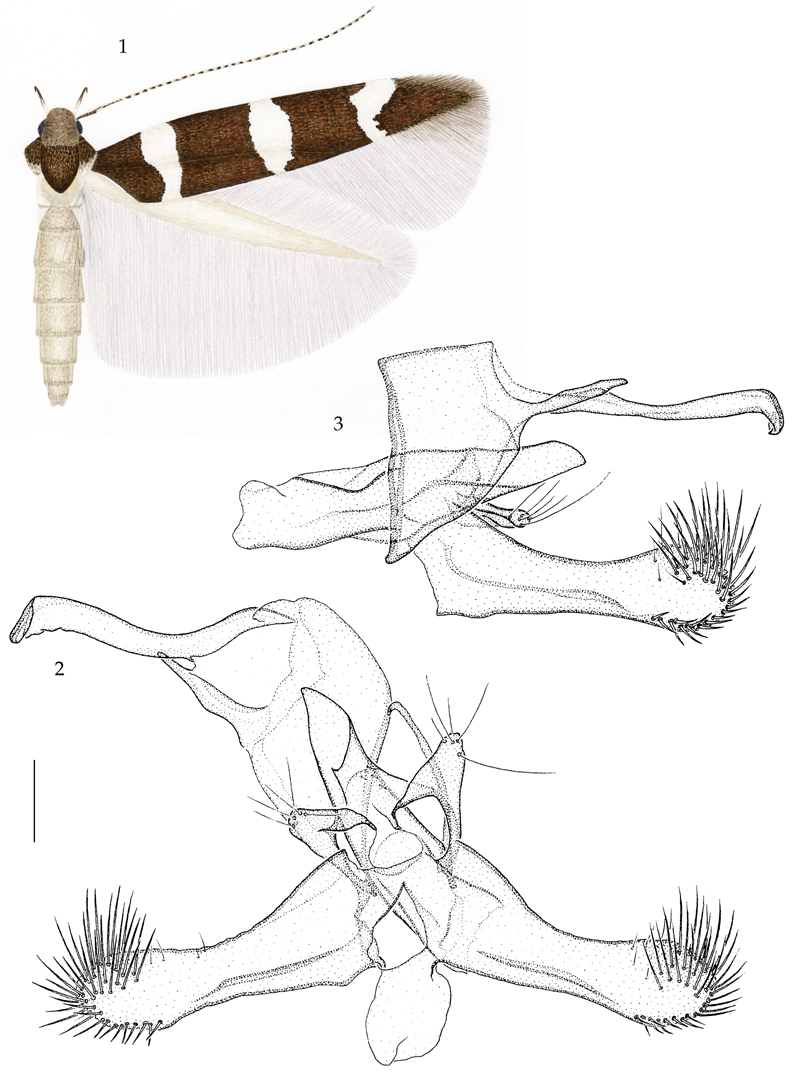
- Hodgesiella quagella

Scientific classification
- Domain: Eukaryota
- Kingdom: Animalia
- Phylum: Arthropoda
- Class: Insecta
- Order: Lepidoptera
- Family: Cosmopterigidae
- Subfamily: Cosmopteriginae
- Genus: Hodgesiella; Riedl, 1965

Type species
- Stagmatophora rebeli Krone, 1906

Synonyms
- Stagmatophora (Hodgesiella) Riedl, 1965

= Hodgesiella =

Genus of moths

Hodgesiella is a genus of moth in the family Cosmopterigidae.

== Species ==
- Hodgesiella callistrepta (Meyrick, 1917)
- Hodgesiella christophi Koster & Sinev, 2003
- Hodgesiella lampropeda (Meyrick, 1917)
- Hodgesiella puplesisi Sinev, 1989
- Hodgesiella quagella (Christoph, 1887)
- Hodgesiella rebeli (Krone, 1905)
- Hodgesiella rhodorrhisella (Kasy, 1970)
