= Idiostyla =

Scientific classification
- Kingdom: Animalia
- Phylum: Arthropoda
- Class: Insecta
- Order: Lepidoptera
- Family: Cosmopterigidae
- Subfamily: Cosmopteriginae
- Genus: Idiostyla; Meyrick, 1921

Genus of moths

Idiostyla is a genus of moth in the family Cosmopterigidae. It was discovered in 1921 by Edward Meyrick. Species include oculata and catharopis. Both were discovered in Fiji and neither has been catalogued since.

It should not be confused with several species of craneflies bearing the species name idiostyla.

== Species ==
- Idiostyla catharopis Meyrick, 1922
- Idiostyla oculata Meyrick, 1921
