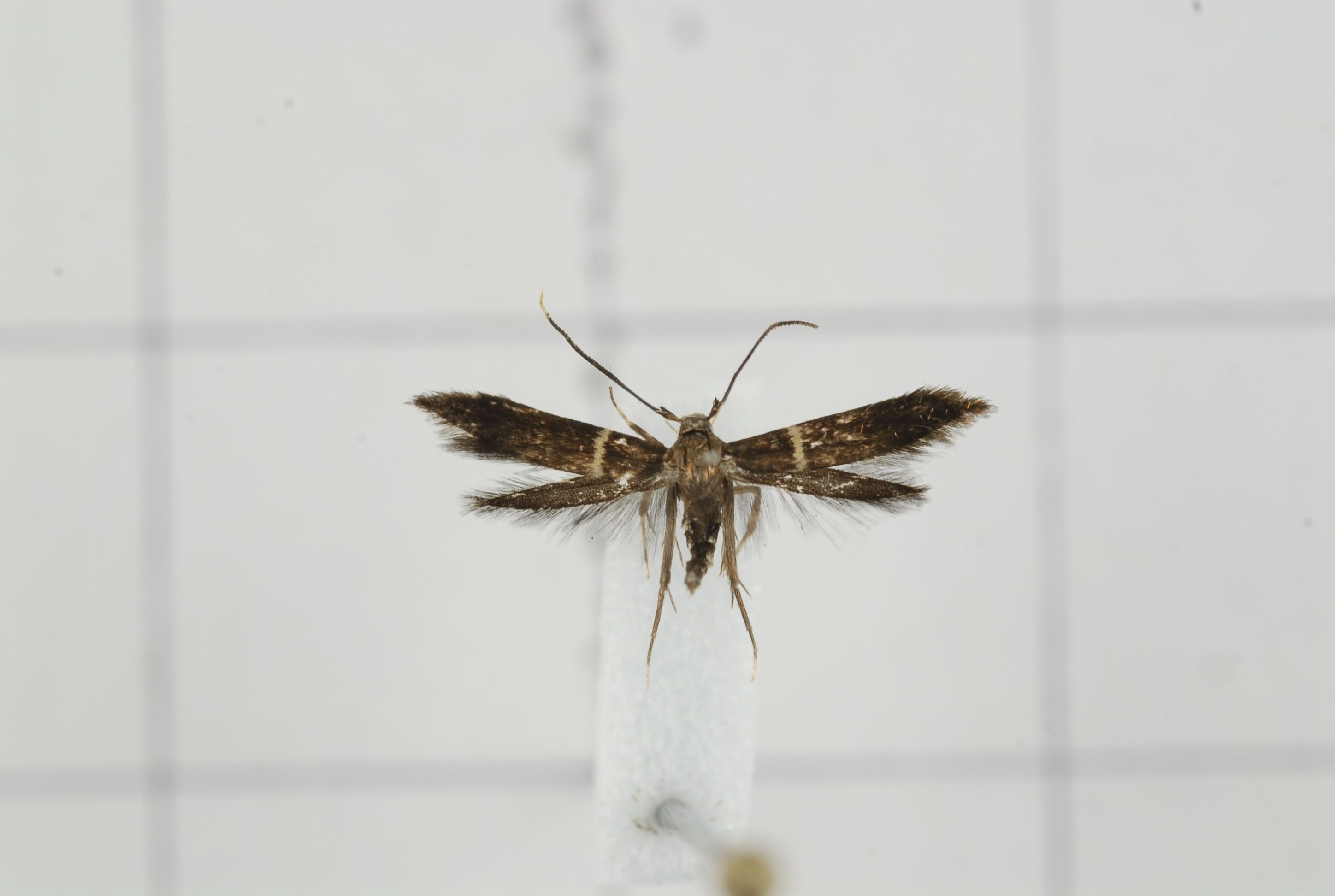

Scientific classification
- Kingdom: Animalia
- Phylum: Arthropoda
- Class: Insecta
- Order: Lepidoptera
- Family: Cosmopterigidae
- Subfamily: Cosmopteriginae
- Genus: Passalotis; Meyrick, 1932
- Species: P. irianthes

Binomial name
- Passalotis irianthes Meyrick, 1932

= Passalotis =

Genus of moths

Passalotis is a genus of moth in the family of Cosmopterigidae.

It contains only one species, the Passalotis irianthes.

It is found in Taiwan.
