= Strophalingias =

Scientific classification
- Kingdom: Animalia
- Phylum: Arthropoda
- Class: Insecta
- Order: Lepidoptera
- Family: Cosmopterigidae
- Genus: Strophalingias; Meyrick, 1931
- Species: S. allactica

Binomial name
- Strophalingias allactica Meyrick, 1931

Genus of moths

Strophalingias is a genus of moth in the family Cosmopterigidae. It contains only one species, Strophalingias allactica, which is found in India (Sikkim).
