= Dorodoca =

Scientific classification
- Kingdom: Animalia
- Phylum: Arthropoda
- Class: Insecta
- Order: Lepidoptera
- Family: Cosmopterigidae
- Subfamily: Cosmopteriginae
- Genus: Dorodoca; Meyrick, 1915

Genus of moths

Dorodoca is a genus of moths in the family Cosmopterigidae.

== Species ==
- Dorodoca anthophoba Ghesquière, 1940
- Dorodoca chrysaula (Meyrick, 1927)
- Dorodoca chrysomochla Meyrick, 1915
- Dorodoca eometalla Meyrick, 1926
- Dorodoca leucomochla Meyrick, 1922
