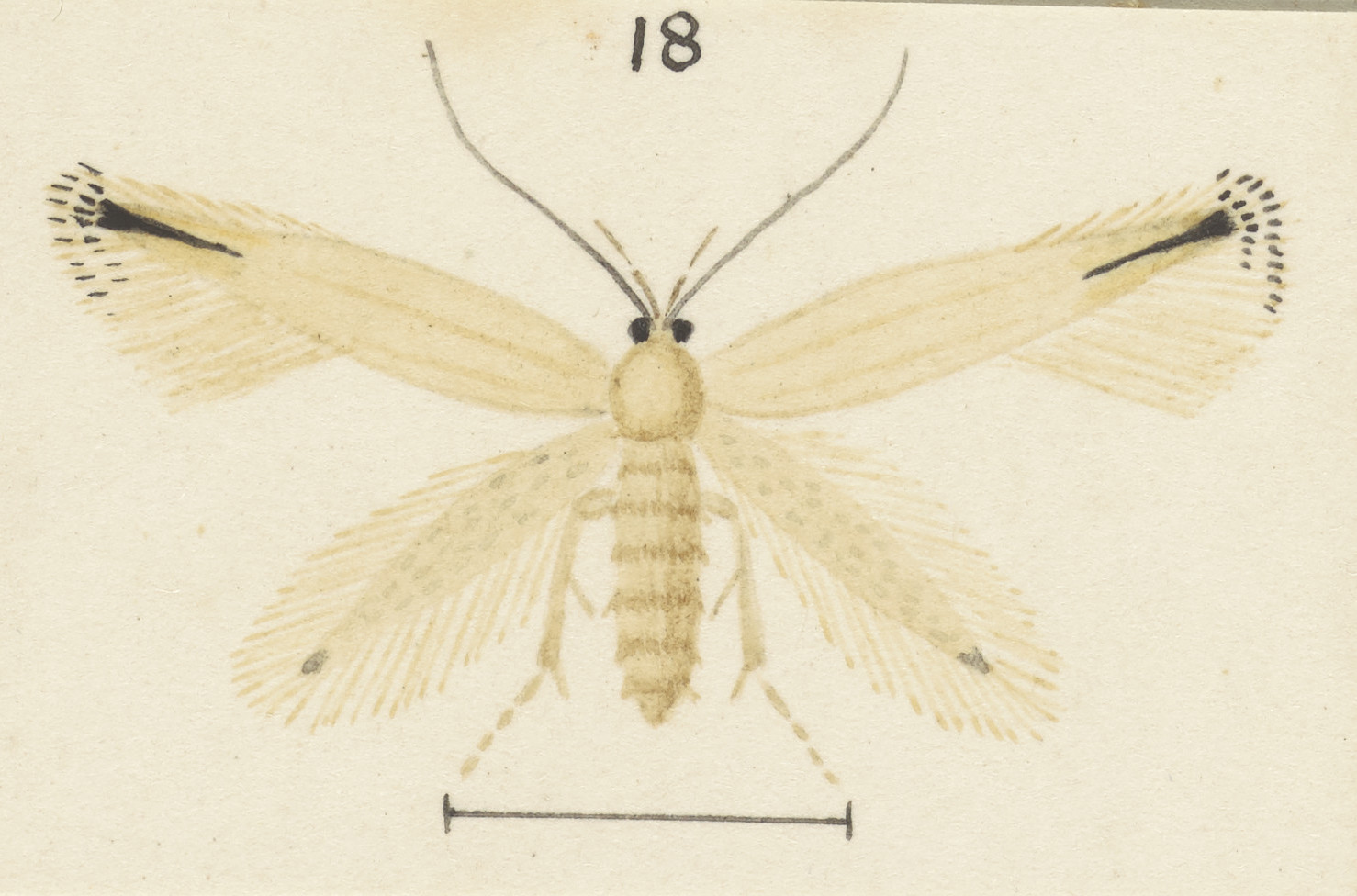
- Illustration of female

Conservation status
- Data Deficit (NZ TCS)

Scientific classification
- Kingdom: Animalia
- Phylum: Arthropoda
- Clade: Pancrustacea
- Class: Insecta
- Order: Lepidoptera
- Family: Cosmopterigidae
- Genus: Thectophila; Meyrick, 1927
- Species: T. acmotypa

Binomial name
- Thectophila acmotypa Meyrick, 1927

= Thectophila =

Thectophila acmotypa

Genus of moths

Thectophila is a genus of moths in the family Cosmopterigidae, although some sources place it in the family Blastodacnidae. The genus contains only one species, Thectophila acmotypa. This species is endemic to New Zealand. In 2025 this species was classified as "data deficient" under the New Zealand Threat Classification System.

== Taxonomy ==
This species was originally described by Edward Meyrick in 1927 using a female specimen collected by George Hudson at Arthur's Pass at approximately 1200 m. in February. Hudson discussed and illustrated the species under that name in his 1928 publication The Butterflies and Moths of New Zealand. However as at 2025 this species is regarded as being taxonomically unresolved. The holotype specimen is held at the Natural History Museum, London.

== Description ==
Meyrick described the species as follows:

♀ 14 mm. Head, thorax ochreous-whitish (rubbed). Palpi whitish. Forewings lanceolate, apex acutely produced, caudulate; ochreous-whitish; a fine dark grey line from disc at 4/5 to apex, terminating in a black apical dot: cilia ochreous-whitish, round apex short segments of blackish subbasal and grey postmedian lines. Hind-wings pale grey; cilia whitish.

== Distribution ==
This species is endemic to New Zealand. It is only known from one locality, Arthur's Pass. report|title=The conservation status of invertebrates in Canterbury|author1=Pawson, Stephen M.|author2=Emberson, Rowan M.|date=2000|publisher=Department of Conservation|page=54|hdl=10182/1658|issn=1171-9834}}</ref>

== Biology and behaviour ==
Very little is known of the biology of this species. The adult male is on the wing in February.

== Habitat and host species ==
This species prefers habitat consisting of rough herbage in mountainous terrain. The habitat of the species is protected as it falls within the Arthur's Pass National Park. The host species of this moths larvae is unknown.

== Conservation status ==
In 2025 this species was classified by the New Zealand Department of Conservation as "data deficient" under the New Zealand Threat Classification System. This species was also classified as having the "Data Deficient" conservation status in 2015.
