= Spiroterma =

Scientific classification
- Kingdom: Animalia
- Phylum: Arthropoda
- Class: Insecta
- Order: Lepidoptera
- Family: Cosmopterigidae
- Genus: Spiroterma; Meyrick, 1915
- Species: S. caranaea

Binomial name
- Spiroterma caranaea Meyrick, 1915

Genus of moths

Spiroterma is a genus of moth in the family Cosmopterigidae. It contains only one species, Spiroterma caranaea, which is found in Sri Lanka.
