= Heterotactis =

Scientific classification
- Kingdom: Animalia
- Phylum: Arthropoda
- Class: Insecta
- Order: Lepidoptera
- Family: Cosmopterigidae
- Subfamily: Cosmopteriginae
- Genus: Heterotactis; Meyrick, 1928
- Species: H. quincuncialis

Binomial name
- Heterotactis quincuncialis Meyrick, 1928

Genus of moths

Heterotactis is a genus of moth in the family Cosmopterigidae. It contains only one species, Heterotactis quincuncialis, which is found in India.
