= Balionebris =

Scientific classification
- Kingdom: Animalia
- Phylum: Arthropoda
- Clade: Pancrustacea
- Class: Insecta
- Order: Lepidoptera
- Family: Elachistidae
- Subfamily: Agonoxeninae
- Genus: Balionebris; Meyrick, 1935

Genus of moths

Balionebris is a genus of moths in the family Agonoxenidae. It was discovered by Edward Meyrick in 1935 and contains only one species, Balionebris bacteriota.
