= Melanozestis =

Scientific classification
- Kingdom: Animalia
- Phylum: Arthropoda
- Class: Insecta
- Order: Lepidoptera
- Family: Cosmopterigidae
- Genus: Melanozestis; Meyrick, 1930
- Species: M. heterodesma

Binomial name
- Melanozestis heterodesma Meyrick, 1930

Genus of moths

Melanozestis is a genus of moth in the family Cosmopterigidae. It contains only one species, Melanozestis heterodesma, which is found in South Africa.
