= Ulochora =

Scientific classification
- Kingdom: Animalia
- Phylum: Arthropoda
- Class: Insecta
- Order: Lepidoptera
- Family: Cosmopterigidae
- Subfamily: Cosmopteriginae
- Genus: Ulochora; Meyrick, 1920
- Species: U. streptosema

Binomial name
- Ulochora streptosema Meyrick, 1920

Genus of moths

Ulochora is a monotypic moth genus in the family Cosmopterigidae described by Edward Meyrick in 1920. It contains only one species, Ulochora streptosema, described by the same author in the same year, which is found in Fiji.
