= Echinoscelis =

Scientific classification
- Kingdom: Animalia
- Phylum: Arthropoda
- Class: Insecta
- Order: Lepidoptera
- Family: Cosmopterigidae
- Subfamily: Cosmopteriginae
- Genus: Echinoscelis; Meyrick, 1886

Genus of moths

Echinoscelis is a genus of moths in the family Cosmopterigidae.

== Species ==
- Echinoscelis hemithia Meyrick, 1886
- Echinoscelis pandani (Turner, 1923)
