= Amblytenes =

Scientific classification
- Kingdom: Animalia
- Phylum: Arthropoda
- Class: Insecta
- Order: Lepidoptera
- Family: Cosmopterigidae
- Genus: Amblytenes; Meyrick, 1930
- Species: A. lunatica

Binomial name
- Amblytenes lunatica Meyrick, 1930

Genus of moths

Amblytenes is a genus of moth in the family Cosmopterigidae. It contains only one species, Amblytenes lunatica, which is found in Brazil.
