= Ashibusa =

Scientific classification
- Kingdom: Animalia
- Phylum: Arthropoda
- Clade: Pancrustacea
- Class: Insecta
- Order: Lepidoptera
- Family: Cosmopterigidae
- Subfamily: Cosmopteriginae
- Genus: Ashibusa; Matsumura, 1931

Genus of moths

Ashibusa is a genus of moth in the family Cosmopterigidae.

== Species ==
- Ashibusa aculeata Z.W. Zhang & H.H. Li, 2009
- Ashibusa clavativalvula Z.W. Zhang & H.H. Li, 2009
- Ashibusa flavalba Z.W. Zhang & H.H. Li, 2009
- Ashibusa jezoensis S. Matsumura, 1931
- Ashibusa lativalvula Z.W. Zhang & H.H. Li, 2009
- Ashibusa sinensis Z.W. Zhang & H.H. Li, 2009
- Ashibusa subelliptica Z.W. Zhang & H.H. Li, 2009
