= Colonophora =

Scientific classification
- Kingdom: Animalia
- Phylum: Arthropoda
- Class: Insecta
- Order: Lepidoptera
- Family: Cosmopterigidae
- Genus: Colonophora; Meyrick, 1914

Genus of moths

Colonophora is a genus of moths in the family Cosmopterigidae.

== Species ==
- Colonophora cateiata Meyrick, 1914
- Colonophora ictifera Meyrick, 1937
