= Ischnobathra =

Scientific classification
- Kingdom: Animalia
- Phylum: Arthropoda
- Class: Insecta
- Order: Lepidoptera
- Family: Cosmopterigidae
- Subfamily: Cosmopteriginae
- Genus: Ischnobathra; Meyrick, 1937

Genus of moths

Ischnobathra is a genus of moths in the family Cosmopterigidae.

== Species ==
- Ischnobathra balanobola Meyrick, 1937
- Ischnobathra dormiens Meyrick, 1937
