= Phepsalostoma =

Scientific classification
- Kingdom: Animalia
- Phylum: Arthropoda
- Class: Insecta
- Order: Lepidoptera
- Family: Elachistidae
- Genus: Phepsalostoma; Meyrick, 1936
- Species: P. electracma

Binomial name
- Phepsalostoma electracma Meyrick, 1935

Synonyms
- Asterostoma Meyrick, 1935 (Preoccupied)

Monotypic genus of moths

Phepsalostoma is a genus of moths in the family Cosmopterigidae. It contains only one species, Phepsalostoma electracma, which is found on Java.
