= Calanesia =

Scientific classification
- Kingdom: Animalia
- Phylum: Arthropoda
- Clade: Pancrustacea
- Class: Insecta
- Order: Lepidoptera
- Family: Cosmopterigidae
- Genus: Calanesia; Sinev, 1990
- Species: C. karsholti

Binomial name
- Calanesia karsholti Sinev, 1990

Genus of moths

Calanesia is a genus of moth in the family Cosmopterigidae. It contains only one species, Calanesia karsholti, which is found in Tunisia, North Africa.

The wingspan is 13–16 mm (0.51–0.63 in). Adults have been recorded in March.
