= Melnea =

Scientific classification
- Kingdom: Animalia
- Phylum: Arthropoda
- Clade: Pancrustacea
- Class: Insecta
- Order: Lepidoptera
- Family: Cosmopterigidae
- Genus: Melnea; J.F.G.Clarke, 1986
- Species: M. armigera

Binomial name
- Melnea armigera (Meyrick, 1923)

Synonyms
- Ascalenia armigera Meyrick, 1923

Genus of moths

Melnea is a gelechioid moth genus usually placed in the cosmet moth family (Cosmopterigidae); its exact relationships are not yet resolved however. Only a single species is known, Melnea armigera. It ranges widely in insular Melanesia and southern Polynesia (Nuku Hiva, Tahiti, Palau, Fiji and the Solomons). Furthermore it had been recorded from the Mauritius, Seychelles and Réunion. Its distribution is the result of accidental introductions by human travellers but its hostplant remains unknown.
