= Harpograptis =

Scientific classification
- Kingdom: Animalia
- Phylum: Arthropoda
- Class: Insecta
- Order: Lepidoptera
- Family: Cosmopterigidae
- Genus: Harpograptis; Meyrick, 1925
- Species: H. eucharacta

Binomial name
- Harpograptis eucharacta (Meyrick, 1922)

Synonyms
- Stomopteryx eucharacta Meyrick, 1922

Genus of moths

Harpograptis is a genus of moth in the family Cosmopterigidae. It contains only one species, Harpograptis eucharacta, which is found in Brazil.
