= Pyretaulax =

Scientific classification
- Kingdom: Animalia
- Phylum: Arthropoda
- Class: Insecta
- Order: Lepidoptera
- Family: Cosmopterigidae
- Genus: Pyretaulax; Meyrick, 1921
- Species: P. miltogramma

Binomial name
- Pyretaulax miltogramma Meyrick, 1921

Genus of moths

Pyretaulax is a genus of moth in the family Cosmopterigidae. It contains only one species, Pyretaulax miltogramma, which is found on Java.
