= Syntomaula =

Scientific classification
- Kingdom: Animalia
- Phylum: Arthropoda
- Class: Insecta
- Order: Lepidoptera
- Family: Cosmopterigidae
- Subfamily: Cosmopteriginae
- Genus: Syntomaula; Meyrick, 1914

Synonyms
- Bathraula Meyrick, 1919; Bathybalia Diakonoff, 1954

Genus of moths

Syntomaula is a genus of moths in the family Cosmopterigidae.

== Species ==
- Syntomaula cana Moriuti, 1977
- Syntomaula microsperma Diakonoff, 1954
- Syntomaula simulatella Walker, 1864
- Syntomaula tephrota Meyrick, 1914
