= Semolina (moth) =

Scientific classification
- Kingdom: Animalia
- Phylum: Arthropoda
- Class: Insecta
- Order: Lepidoptera
- Family: Cosmopterigidae
- Genus: Semolina; Clarke, 1971
- Species: S. leucotricha

Binomial name
- Semolina leucotricha Clarke, 1971

Genus of moths

Semolina is a genus of moth in the family Cosmopterigidae. It contains only one species, Semolina leucotricha, which is found on Rapa Iti.
