= Archisopha =

Scientific classification
- Kingdom: Animalia
- Phylum: Arthropoda
- Class: Insecta
- Order: Lepidoptera
- Family: Cosmopterigidae
- Subfamily: Cosmopteriginae
- Genus: Archisopha; Meyrick, 1918
- Species: A. foliosa

Binomial name
- Archisopha foliosa Meyrick, 1918

Genus of moths

Archisopha is a genus of moth in the family Cosmopterigidae. It contains only one species, Archisopha foliosa, which is found in Sri Lanka.
