= Ressia =

Scientific classification
- Kingdom: Animalia
- Phylum: Arthropoda
- Clade: Pancrustacea
- Class: Insecta
- Order: Lepidoptera
- Family: Cosmopterigidae
- Subfamily: Cosmopteriginae
- Genus: Ressia; Sinev, 1988

Genus of moths

Ressia is a genus of moth in the family Cosmopterigidae.

== Species ==
- Ressia auriculata Zhang & Li, 2010
- Ressia didesmococcusphaga (Yang, 1977)
- Ressia quercidentella Sinev, 1988
- Ressia tonkinella Sinev, 1988
