= Microzestis =

Scientific classification
- Kingdom: Animalia
- Phylum: Arthropoda
- Clade: Pancrustacea
- Class: Insecta
- Order: Lepidoptera
- Family: Cosmopterigidae
- Genus: Microzestis; Meyrick, 1929
- Species: M. inelegans

Binomial name
- Microzestis inelegans Meyrick, 1929

Genus of moths

Microzestis is a gelechioid moth genus usually placed in the cosmet moth family (Cosmopterigidae); its exact relationships are not yet resolved however. Only a single species is known, Microzestis inelegans. It occurs in the Marquesas Islands of Polynesia and is notable for the unusual habits of its caterpillars.
