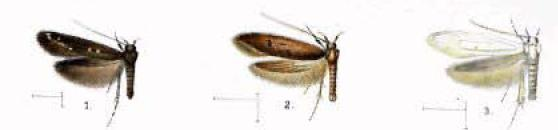
- Upper wings of some Hyposmocoma species from the Hawaiian Islands

Scientific classification
- Kingdom: Animalia
- Phylum: Arthropoda
- Clade: Pancrustacea
- Class: Insecta
- Order: Lepidoptera
- Infraorder: Heteroneura
- Clade: Eulepidoptera
- Clade: Ditrysia
- Clade: Apoditrysia
- Superfamily: Gelechioidea
- Family: Cosmopterigidae; Heinemann & Wocke, 1876

Subfamilies
- Antequerinae Hodges, 1978; Chrysopeleiinae Mosher, 1916; Cosmopteriginae Heinemann & Wocke, 1876; Scaeosophinae Meyrick, 1922

Synonyms
- Cosmopterygidae; Diplosaridae Meyrick, 1915; Hyposmocomidae Hampson, 1918

= Cosmopterigidae =

Family of moths

The Cosmopterigidae are a family of insects (cosmet moths) in the order Lepidoptera. These are small moths with narrow wings whose tiny larvae feed internally on the leaves, seeds and stems of their host plants. About 1500 species have been described. The taxonomic family is most diverse in the Australian and Pacific region with about 780 species.

Several genera formerly included here have been moved to the Agonoxeninae.

== Taxonomy ==
The family consists of four subfamilies:

- Subfamily Antequerinae Hodges, 1978
- Subfamily Chrysopeleiinae Mosher, 1916
- Subfamily Cosmopteriginae Heinemann & Wocke, 1876
- Subfamily Scaeosophinae Meyrick, 1922

=== Genera ===
The following genera are in subfamily Cosmopteriginae or not assigned to a subfamily: For genera assigned the other subfamilues see Antequerinae, Chrysopeleiinae, and Scaeosophinae.

- Subfamily Cosmopteriginae Heinemann & Wocke, 1876
  - Adeana
  - Allotalanta
  - Anatrachyntis
  - Anoncia
  - Aphanosara
  - Archisopha
  - Ashibusa
  - Axiarcha
  - Clemmatista
  - Coccidiphila
  - Cosmopterix
  - Diatonica
  - Diversivalva
  - Dorodoca
  - Dromiaulis
  - Ecballogonia
  - Echinoscelis
  - Endograptis
  - Eralea
  - Eteobalea
  - Hodgesiella
  - Hyposmocoma
  - Glaphyristis
  - Haplochrois
  - Heureta
  - Heterotactis
  - Idiostyla
  - Iressa
  - Ischnobathra
  - Isidiella
  - Isorrhoa
  - Labdia
  - Leptozestis
  - Macrobathra
  - Melanocinclis
  - Mimodoxa
  - Morphotica
  - Mothonodes
  - Opszyga
  - Otonoma
  - Paratheta
  - Parathystas
  - Passalotis
  - Pebobs
  - Pechyptila
  - Persicoptila
  - Phaneroctena
  - Pyroderces
  - Ramphis
  - Ressia
  - Rhadinastis
  - Sematoptis
  - Stagmatophora
  - Synploca
  - Syntomaula
  - Tanygona
  - Teladoma
  - Tetraconta
  - Tolliella
  - Triclonella
  - Trissodoris
  - Ulochora
  - Urangela
  - Vulcaniella
- Incertae sedis
  - Acleracra
  - Aganoptila
  - Amblytenes
  - Apothetodes
  - Calanesia
  - Calycobathra
  - Clarkeophlebia
  - Colonophora
  - Crobylophanes
  - Dynatophysis
  - Falcatariella
  - Griphocosma
  - Haplophylax
  - Harpograptis
  - Hedroxena
  - Herlinda
  - Homosaces
  - Ischnangela
  - Melanozestis
  - Meleonoma
  - Melnea
  - Meneptila
  - Metagrypa
  - Microzestis
  - Minivalva
  - Neachandella
  - Neomelanesthes
  - Orthromicta
  - Pauroptila
  - Phepsalostoma
  - Phosphaticola
  - Protorhiza
  - Pseudascalenia
  - Pycnagorastis
  - Pyretaulax
  - Schendylotis
  - Semolina
  - Sindicola
  - Spiroterma
  - Stromatitica
  - Strophalingias
  - Thectophila
  - Trachydora
  - Zanclarches

=== Selected former genera ===
- Eritarbes
- Lallia
- Scaeothyris
- Xestocasis

== See also ==
- List of cosmopterigid genera
