= Triclonella pictoria =

Scientific classification
- Kingdom: Animalia
- Phylum: Arthropoda
- Class: Insecta
- Order: Lepidoptera
- Family: Cosmopterigidae
- Genus: Triclonella
- Species: T. pictoria

Binomial name
- Triclonella pictoria Meyrick, 1916

Species of moth

Triclonella pictoria is a moth in the family Cosmopterigidae. It is found in Guyana and Brazil.

The wingspan is about 21 mm. The forewings are ochreous-bronze with a white basal mark in the middle. The extreme dorsal edge is white, thickened towards the base. A very fine white line is found along the submedian fold from the base to the middle of the wing and there is a white line from two-thirds of the costa to four-fifths of the dorsum, the discal portion forming an acute angle inwards, the area beyond this wholly dark fuscous streaked with white irroration on the veins. The terminal edge is white. The hindwings are dark grey, lighter anteriorly, with hyaline areas towards the base in and beneath the cell.

== See also ==
- Triclonella

Triclonella determinatella

Triclonella mediocris

Triclonella xuthocelis

Triclonella antidectis

Triclonella pergandeella

Triclonella bicoloripennis

Triclonella platyxantha

Triclonella elliptica
