= Scaeosopha =

Scientific classification
- Kingdom: Animalia
- Phylum: Arthropoda
- Class: Insecta
- Order: Lepidoptera
- Family: Cosmopterigidae
- Subfamily: Scaeosophinae
- Genus: Scaeosopha; Meyrick, 1914

Synonyms
- Scaeothyris Diakonoff, 1968

Genus of moths

Scaeosopha is a genus of moths in the family Cosmopterigidae.

== Species ==
- mitescens species group
  - Scaeosopha chionoscia
  - Scaeosopha convexa
  - Scaeosopha dentivalvula
  - Scaeosopha gibbosa
  - Scaeosopha grandannulata
  - Scaeosopha incantata
  - Scaeosopha mitescens
  - Scaeosopha nigrimarginata
  - Scaeosopha rarimaculata
  - Scaeosopha rotundivalvula H.H. Li, 2005
  - Scaeosopha sattleri H.H. Li, 2005
  - Scaeosopha trigonia
  - Scaeosopha triocellata
- percnaula species group
  - Scaeosopha betrokensis
  - Scaeosopha erecta
  - Scaeosopha hongkongensis
  - Scaeosopha minuta
  - Scaeosopha nullivalvella
  - Scaeosopha percnaula
  - Scaeosopha pseusta
  - Scaeosopha sabahensis
  - Scaeosopha sinevi
  - Scaeosopha spinivalvata
  - Scaeosopha tuberculata
  - Scaeosopha victoriensis
- unknown species group
  - Scaeosopha atrinervis

== Former species ==
- Scaeosopha albicellata Meyrick (now in Triclonella)
- Scaeosopha citrocarpa Meyrick (now in Triclonella)
