= Trailing lespedeza =

Trailing lespedeza is a common name for several plants and may refer to:

- Lespedeza procumbens
- Lespedeza repens
