= Shrub lespedeza =

Shrub lespedeza is a common name for several plants and may refer to:

- Lespedeza bicolor, native to Asia
- Lespedeza thunbergii, native to China and Japan
