= Dendrophilia neotaphronoma =

Scientific classification
- Kingdom: Animalia
- Phylum: Arthropoda
- Class: Insecta
- Order: Lepidoptera
- Family: Gelechiidae
- Genus: Dentrophilia
- Species: D. neotaphronoma

Binomial name
- Dendrophilia neotaphronoma Ponomarenko, 1993

Synonyms
- Hypatima obscurella Park, 1993; Dendrophilia obscurella

Species of moth

Dendrophilia neotaphronoma is a moth of the family Gelechiidae. It was described by Ponomarenko in 1993. It is found in Russia (Primorsky Krai), Korea and Taiwan.

The larvae feed on Lespedeza bicolor.
