= Dendrophilia unicolorella =

Scientific classification
- Kingdom: Animalia
- Phylum: Arthropoda
- Class: Insecta
- Order: Lepidoptera
- Family: Gelechiidae
- Genus: Dentrophilia
- Species: D. unicolorella

Binomial name
- Dendrophilia unicolorella Ponomarenko, 1993

Species of moth

Dendrophilia unicolorella is a moth of the family Gelechiidae. It was described by Ponomarenko in 1993. It is found in Russia (Primorskii krai) and Korea.

The larvae feed on Lespedeza bicolor.
