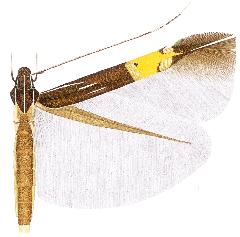

Scientific classification
- Kingdom: Animalia
- Phylum: Arthropoda
- Class: Insecta
- Order: Lepidoptera
- Family: Cosmopterigidae
- Genus: Cosmopterix
- Species: C. lespedezae

Binomial name
- Cosmopterix lespedezae Walsingham, 1882

= Cosmopterix lespedezae =

Species of moth

Cosmopterix lespedezae is a moth of the family Cosmopterigidae. It is known from the United States (South Carolina, Kentucky, Ohio, Arkansas, Texas and Mississippi).

== Description ==
Male, female. Forewing length 4.7 mm. Head: frons shining ochreous-grey with greenish and reddish reflections, vertex and neck tufts shining dark brown with reddish gloss, laterally and medially lined white, collar shining dark brown with reddish gloss; labial palpus first segment very short, white, second segment four-fifths of the length of third, dark brown with white longitudinal lines laterally and ventrally, third segment white, lined brown laterally; scape dorsally dark brown with a white anterior line, ventrally white, antenna shining dark brown with a white line from base to beyond one-half, followed towards apex by approximately seven dark brown segments, four white, two dark brown, two white, ten dark brown and eight white segments at apex. Thorax and tegulae shining dark brown with reddish gloss, thorax with a white median line, tegulae lined white inwardly. Legs: shining dark brown with reddish gloss, femora of midleg and hindleg shining ochreous-grey with golden gloss, foreleg with a white line on tibia and tarsal segments one to three and five, tibia of midleg with white oblique basal and medial lines and a white apical ring, tarsal segments missing, tibia of hindleg with a very oblique silvery white line at base, a less oblique silvery white medial streak and a white apical ring, tarsal segment one with a white basal ring and white dorsal streak in the apical half, segments two to four dorsally white, segment five entirely white, spurs white dorsally, dark brown ventrally. Forewing shining dark brown with reddish gloss, four white lines in the basal area, a subcostal from base to one-quarter bending from costa in distal half, a short medial above fold, its centre under of the distal end of the subcostal, a subdorsal slightly longer than the medial, and a little further from base, a narrow dorsal from beyond base to one-fifth, a yellow transverse fascia beyond the middle, narrowing towards dorsum and with a short and narrow apical protrusion, bordered at the inner edge by a tubercular pale golden metallic fascia with some greenish reflection, and with a small subcostal patch of blackish brown scales on the outside, bordered at outer edge by two tubercular pale golden metallic costal and dorsal spots, the dorsal spot three times as large as the costal and more towards base, the costal and dorsal spots irregularly lined dark brown on the inside, a white costal streak from the costal spot, a shining white apical line from just beyond apical protrusion, cilia dark brown, paler towards dorsum. Hindwing shining greyish brown with reddish gloss, cilia brown. Underside: forewing shining greyish brown, the white apical line distinctly visible in the apical cilia, hindwing shining greyish brown. Abdomen dorsally shining dark brown with reddish gloss, laterally shining grey with greenish reflection, ventrally dark grey, in the middle yellowish white, segments banded shining white posteriorly, anal tuft ochreous-white.

== Biology ==
The larvae feed on various Fabaceae species, including Lespedeza and Desmodium species. They mine the leaves of their host plant. The mine begins in the midrib, spreading outward and upward between two lateral veins. In that part of the early mine adjacent to the lower of the lateral veins between which it lies, the parenchyma is left in narrow transverse bars, giving the mine a very characteristic aspect. As the mine increases, it extends beyond the confines of the two veins, with irregular projections and parenchyma all consumed. The pupa is formed within the mine beneath the transverse bars, which are here lined with silk forming a tubular pupal chamber. Adults are on wing from early July to mid-September.
