= Dendrophilia mediofasciana =

Scientific classification
- Kingdom: Animalia
- Phylum: Arthropoda
- Clade: Pancrustacea
- Class: Insecta
- Order: Lepidoptera
- Family: Gelechiidae
- Genus: Dentrophilia
- Species: D. mediofasciana

Binomial name
- Dendrophilia mediofasciana (Park, 1991)

Synonyms
- Hypatima mediofasciana Park, 1991; Dendrophilia brunneofasciella Ponomarenko, 1993

Species of moth

Dendrophilia mediofasciana is a moth of the family Gelechiidae. It was described by Kyu-Tek Park in 1991. It is found in Russia (Primorskii krai), Korea and Honshu, Japan.

The wingspan is 11–13 mm.

The larvae feed on Lespedeza bicolor.
