= Triclonella philantha =

Scientific classification
- Kingdom: Animalia
- Phylum: Arthropoda
- Class: Insecta
- Order: Lepidoptera
- Family: Cosmopterigidae
- Genus: Triclonella
- Species: T. philantha

Binomial name
- Triclonella philantha Meyrick, 1920

Species of moth

Triclonella philantha is a moth in the family Cosmopterigidae. It is found in Peru.
