= Scaeosopha rotundivalvula =

Scientific classification
- Domain: Eukaryota
- Kingdom: Animalia
- Phylum: Arthropoda
- Class: Insecta
- Order: Lepidoptera
- Family: Cosmopterigidae
- Genus: Scaeosopha
- Species: S. rotundivalvula

Binomial name
- Scaeosopha rotundivalvula Li, 2005

Species of moth

Scaeosopha rotundivalvula is a species of moth of the family Cosmopterigidae. It is found in China and on Sumatra.

The wingspan is about 18 mm.
