= Scaeosopha victoriensis =

Scientific classification
- Kingdom: Animalia
- Phylum: Arthropoda
- Clade: Pancrustacea
- Class: Insecta
- Order: Lepidoptera
- Family: Cosmopterigidae
- Genus: Scaeosopha
- Species: S. victoriensis

Binomial name
- Scaeosopha victoriensis Sinev et Li, 2012

Species of moth

Scaeosopha victoriensis is a species of moth of the family Cosmopterigidae. It is found in Zimbabwe.

The wingspan is about 15.5 mm.

== Etymology ==
The species name refers to the Victoria Falls, the type locality.
