= Dendrophilia hetaeropsis =

Scientific classification
- Kingdom: Animalia
- Phylum: Arthropoda
- Class: Insecta
- Order: Lepidoptera
- Family: Gelechiidae
- Genus: Dentrophilia
- Species: D. hetaeropsis

Binomial name
- Dendrophilia hetaeropsis (Meyrick, 1935)

Synonyms
- Chelaria hetaeropsis Meyrick, 1935

Species of moth

Dendrophilia hetaeropsis is a moth of the family Gelechiidae. It was described by Edward Meyrick in 1935. It is found in Indonesia (Java) and Thailand.

The length of the forewings is about 11 mm. The wing pattern is similar to other species in the genus and adults can only be identified by genital characters.
