= Scaeosopha betrokensis =

Scientific classification
- Kingdom: Animalia
- Phylum: Arthropoda
- Clade: Pancrustacea
- Class: Insecta
- Order: Lepidoptera
- Family: Cosmopterigidae
- Genus: Scaeosopha
- Species: S. betrokensis

Binomial name
- Scaeosopha betrokensis Sinev & H.H. Li, 2012

Species of moth

Scaeosopha betrokensis is a species of moth of the family Cosmopterigidae. It is found in Madagascar.

The wingspan is 17.5–20 mm.

== Etymology ==
The species name refers to Betroka, the type locality.
