= Scaeosopha triocellata =

Scientific classification
- Kingdom: Animalia
- Phylum: Arthropoda
- Clade: Pancrustacea
- Class: Insecta
- Order: Lepidoptera
- Family: Cosmopterigidae
- Genus: Scaeosopha
- Species: S. triocellata

Binomial name
- Scaeosopha triocellata (Stainton, 1859)

Synonyms
- Butalis triocellata Stainton, 1859; Allotalanta triocellata

Species of moth

Scaeosopha triocellata is a species of moth of the family Cosmopterigidae. It is found in India.

The wingspan is about 14.5 mm (0.57 in).

The larvae feed on Anthocephalus cadamba. They bore the top-shoots of their host plant.
