= Lespedeza frutescens =

Scientific classification
- Kingdom: Plantae
- Clade: Tracheophytes
- Clade: Angiosperms
- Clade: Eudicots
- Clade: Rosids
- Order: Fabales
- Family: Fabaceae
- Subfamily: Faboideae
- Genus: Lespedeza
- Species: L. frutescens

Binomial name
- Lespedeza frutescens (L.) Hornem. (1815)

Synonyms
- Hedysarum frutescens L. (1753); Lespedeza divergens Pursh (1813); Lespedeza frutescens var. acutifructa Farw. (1921); Lespedeza sessiliflora Nutt. (1818), nom. illeg.

Species of legume

Lespedeza frutescens, commonly known as shrubby lespedeza, is a species of herbaceous plant in the legume family.

It is native to eastern North America, where it is found on cliffs, balds, or ledges, forests, ridges or ledges, talus and rocky slopes, woodlands.

== Taxonomy ==
Recent taxonomic work has changed the entity to which the name Lespedeza violacea applies. Based upon a reexamination of the type specimens, it was determined that Lespedeza violacea is the correct name of what was traditionally known as Lespedeza intermedia. The entity traditionally known as Lespedeza violacea now has the name Lespedeza frutescens. This nomenclature rearrangement has resulted in widespread confusion among botanists, with older references and some modern botanists retaining the traditional usage. Literature referencing L. violacea must be carefully checked to determine what concept of the species the author is using.

== Description ==
L. frutescens is a perennial shrub that reaches between 2 and 10 decimeters (approximately 0.7 to 3.3 feet) in height. Leaves are oblong to oblong-elliptic in shape and reach a length between 1.5 and 4 centimeters.
