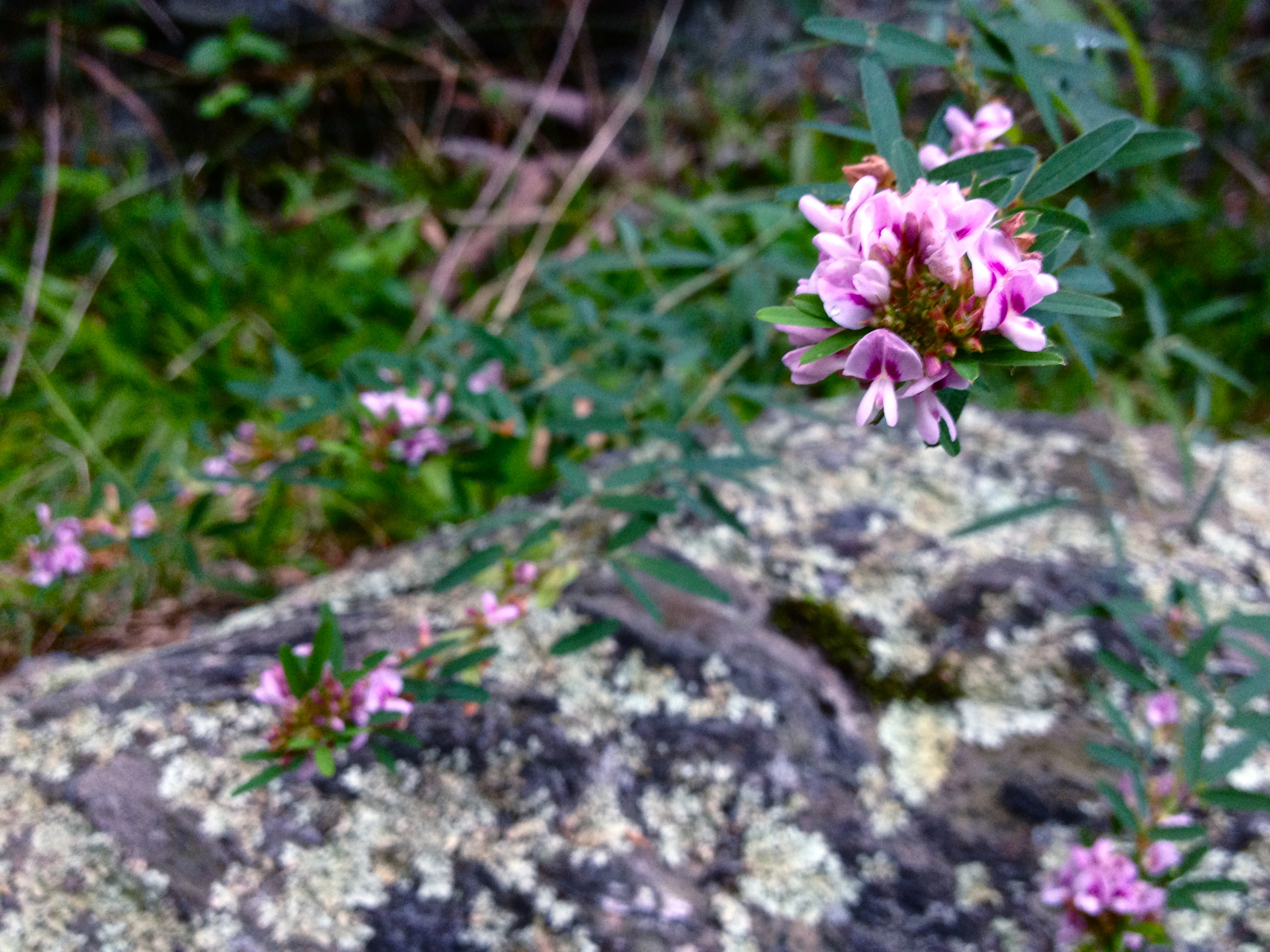
- In Virginia, United States

Conservation status
- Secure (NatureServe)

Scientific classification
- Kingdom: Plantae
- Clade: Tracheophytes
- Clade: Angiosperms
- Clade: Eudicots
- Clade: Rosids
- Order: Fabales
- Family: Fabaceae
- Subfamily: Faboideae
- Genus: Lespedeza
- Species: L. virginica

Binomial name
- Lespedeza virginica (L.) Britton (1893)

Synonyms
- Synonymy: Hedysarum junceum Walter (1788), sensu auct.; Hedysarum reticulatum Muhl. ex Willd. (1803); Hedysarum sessiliflorum Poir. (1805); Lespedeza angustifolia Darl. (1826), nom. illeg.; Lespedeza reticulata Pers. (1807); Lespedeza reticulata var. angustifolia (Darl.) Maxim. (1873); Lespedeza reticulata var. sessiliflora Maxim. (1873), nom. superfl.; Lespedeza reticulata var. virginica (L.) MacMill. (1892), nom. superfl.; Lespedeza sessiliflora Michx. (1803), nom. superfl.; Lespedeza violacea var. angustifolia (Darl.) Torr. & A.Gray (1840); Lespedeza violacea var. reticulata (Muhl. ex Willd.) G.Don (1832); Lespedeza violacea var. sessiliflora (Poir.) G.Don (1832); Lespedeza violacea var. sessiliflora Torr. & A.Gray (1840), nom. illeg.; Lespedeza virginica f. deamii M.Hopkins (1935); Lespedeza virginica var. sessiliflora Schindl. (1913), not validly publ.; Lespedeza virginica var. typica Schindl. (1913), not validly publ.; Medicago virginica L. (1753)

= Lespedeza virginica =

Species of legume

Lespedeza virginica, known as slender bush clover or slender lespedeza, is a species of flowering plant native to much of the United States, as well as Ontario, Canada, and Nuevo León, Mexico. It is a member of the bean family, Fabaceae.

== Description ==
Lespedeza virginica is an herbaceous, perennial legume. It can grow to be up to 2.5 feet tall. Slender bush clover has trifoliate compound leaves and slender primary petioles, with the stem covered in small white hairs. Its alternate leaves are dark green, though sometimes appear pale. The flowers are pink and have a broad upper petal with two side petals. Flowers produced are either cleistogamous or chasmogamous. Slender bush clover flowers from July to September and sets seed from September to October. L. virginica grows well in environments with full to partial sun and can grow successfully in rocky or sandy soils. It produces a taproot to assist in establishment.

== Distribution and habitat ==
Lespedeza virginica is found from Maine south to Florida, west to Texas and north to Michigan as well as in Eastern Canada. L. virginica prefers drier habitats, but can be found in prairies, rocky and sandy forests, savannas and environments with high drainage such as roadsides.

Disjunct populations are found in Nuevo León, Mexico, central Wisconsin and southern Minnesota.

== Ecology ==
Lespedeza virginica is eaten by a wide variety of wildlife. It is a large part of the bobwhite quail's diet as well as deer and other ground birds. The seeds are eaten as well as the leaves. Nectar and pollen are eaten by various long-tongued insects such as butterflies and bees.

Scarification of the testa is reportedly necessary for germination, suggesting that consumption of seeds by animals is important in the plant's life cycle.

== Conservation ==
Lespedeza virginica is listed as threatened in Wisconsin and endangered in New Hampshire and Ontario.

L. virginica is an endangered species of Canada under the Species at Risk Act. It is found there only in the Ojibway Prairie Complex in southern Ontario amongst tallgrass prairie and savanna habitats. It is threatened by changes to patterns of habitat disturbance, with lack of requisite open areas, and by competition with invasive species, notably crownvetch.
