= Triclonella turbinalis =

Scientific classification
- Kingdom: Animalia
- Phylum: Arthropoda
- Class: Insecta
- Order: Lepidoptera
- Family: Cosmopterigidae
- Genus: Triclonella
- Species: T. turbinalis

Binomial name
- Triclonella turbinalis Meyrick, 1933

Species of moth

Triclonella turbinalis is a moth in the family Cosmopterigidae. It is found in Argentina.
