= Triclonella etearcha =

Scientific classification
- Kingdom: Animalia
- Phylum: Arthropoda
- Class: Insecta
- Order: Lepidoptera
- Family: Cosmopterigidae
- Genus: Triclonella
- Species: T. etearcha

Binomial name
- Triclonella etearcha Meyrick, 1920

Species of moth

Triclonella etearcha is a moth in the family Cosmopterigidae. It is found in Peru.
