= Triclonella xanthota =

Scientific classification
- Domain: Eukaryota
- Kingdom: Animalia
- Phylum: Arthropoda
- Class: Insecta
- Order: Lepidoptera
- Family: Cosmopterigidae
- Genus: Triclonella
- Species: T. xanthota

Binomial name
- Triclonella xanthota Walsingham, 1912

Species of moth

Triclonella xanthota is a moth in the family Cosmopterigidae. It is found in Mexico.
