= Dendrophilia acris =

Scientific classification
- Kingdom: Animalia
- Phylum: Arthropoda
- Clade: Pancrustacea
- Class: Insecta
- Order: Lepidoptera
- Family: Gelechiidae
- Genus: Dentrophilia
- Species: D. acris

Binomial name
- Dendrophilia acris Park, 1995

Species of moth

Dendrophilia acris is a moth of the family Gelechiidae. It was described by Kyu-Tek Park in 1995. It is found in Taiwan.
