= Triclonella umbrigera =

Scientific classification
- Kingdom: Animalia
- Phylum: Arthropoda
- Class: Insecta
- Order: Lepidoptera
- Family: Cosmopterigidae
- Genus: Triclonella
- Species: T. umbrigera

Binomial name
- Triclonella umbrigera Meyrick, 1928

Species of moth

Triclonella umbrigera is a moth in the family Cosmopterigidae. It is found in Panama.
