= Triclonella iphicleia =

Scientific classification
- Kingdom: Animalia
- Phylum: Arthropoda
- Class: Insecta
- Order: Lepidoptera
- Family: Cosmopterigidae
- Genus: Triclonella
- Species: T. iphicleia

Binomial name
- Triclonella iphicleia Meyrick, 1924

Species of moth

Triclonella iphicleia is a moth in the family Cosmopterigidae. It is found in Costa Rica.
