= Scaeosopha nullivalvella =

Scientific classification
- Domain: Eukaryota
- Kingdom: Animalia
- Phylum: Arthropoda
- Class: Insecta
- Order: Lepidoptera
- Family: Cosmopterigidae
- Genus: Scaeosopha
- Species: S. nullivalvella

Binomial name
- Scaeosopha nullivalvella Li et Zhang, 2012

Species of moth

Scaeosopha nullivalvella is a species of moth of the family Cosmopterigidae. It is found in China, Brunei and Indonesia.

The wingspan is 14.5–17 mm.
