= Scaeosopha pseusta =

Scientific classification
- Domain: Eukaryota
- Kingdom: Animalia
- Phylum: Arthropoda
- Class: Insecta
- Order: Lepidoptera
- Family: Cosmopterigidae
- Genus: Scaeosopha
- Species: S. pseusta

Binomial name
- Scaeosopha pseusta (Diakonoff, 1968)

Synonyms
- Scaeothyris pseusta Diakonoff, 1968

Species of moth

Scaeosopha pseusta is a species of moth of the family Cosmopterigidae. It is found in the Philippines.
