= Triclonella triargyra =

Scientific classification
- Domain: Eukaryota
- Kingdom: Animalia
- Phylum: Arthropoda
- Class: Insecta
- Order: Lepidoptera
- Family: Cosmopterigidae
- Genus: Triclonella
- Species: T. triargyra

Binomial name
- Triclonella triargyra Meyrick, 1920

Species of insect

Triclonella triargyra is a moth in the family Cosmopterigidae. It is found in Peru.
