= Dendrophilia tetragama =

Scientific classification
- Kingdom: Animalia
- Phylum: Arthropoda
- Class: Insecta
- Order: Lepidoptera
- Family: Gelechiidae
- Genus: Dentrophilia
- Species: D. tetragama

Binomial name
- Dendrophilia tetragama (Meyrick, 1935)

Synonyms
- Chelaria tetragama Meyrick, 1935

Species of moth

Dendrophilia tetragama is a moth of the family Gelechiidae. It was described by Edward Meyrick in 1935. It is found on Java in Indonesia.
