= Scaeosopha sattleri =

Scientific classification
- Domain: Eukaryota
- Kingdom: Animalia
- Phylum: Arthropoda
- Class: Insecta
- Order: Lepidoptera
- Family: Cosmopterigidae
- Genus: Scaeosopha
- Species: S. sattleri

Binomial name
- Scaeosopha sattleri Li, 2005

Species of moth

Scaeosopha sattleri is a species of moth of the family Cosmopterigidae. It is found in China.

The wingspan is about 25.5 mm.
