= Dendrophilia saxigera =

Scientific classification
- Kingdom: Animalia
- Phylum: Arthropoda
- Class: Insecta
- Order: Lepidoptera
- Family: Gelechiidae
- Genus: Dentrophilia
- Species: D. saxigera

Binomial name
- Dendrophilia saxigera (Meyrick, 1931)

Synonyms
- Chelaria saxigera Meyrick, in Caradja, 1931

Species of moth

Dendrophilia saxigera is a moth of the family Gelechiidae. It was first described by Edward Meyrick in 1931. It is found in China (Sichuan, Hunan) and Japan.
