= Scaeosopha percnaula =

Scientific classification
- Kingdom: Animalia
- Phylum: Arthropoda
- Class: Insecta
- Order: Lepidoptera
- Family: Cosmopterigidae
- Genus: Scaeosopha
- Species: S. percnaula

Binomial name
- Scaeosopha percnaula Meyrick, 1914

Synonyms
- Scaeosopha stagnigera Meyrick, 1932

Species of moth

Scaeosopha percnaula is a species of moth of the family Cosmopterigidae. It is found in India.

The wingspan is 17–23 mm.
