= Scaeosopha sabahensis =

Scientific classification
- Kingdom: Animalia
- Phylum: Arthropoda
- Clade: Pancrustacea
- Class: Insecta
- Order: Lepidoptera
- Family: Cosmopterigidae
- Genus: Scaeosopha
- Species: S. sabahensis

Binomial name
- Scaeosopha sabahensis Sinev et Li, 2012

Species of moth

Scaeosopha sabahensis is a species of moth of the family Cosmopterigidae. It is found in Sabah on Borneo.

The wingspan is 13–16.5 mm.

== Etymology ==
The species name is derived from Sabah, the type locality.
