= Scaeosopha spinivalvata =

Scientific classification
- Domain: Eukaryota
- Kingdom: Animalia
- Phylum: Arthropoda
- Class: Insecta
- Order: Lepidoptera
- Family: Cosmopterigidae
- Genus: Scaeosopha
- Species: S. spinivalvata

Binomial name
- Scaeosopha spinivalvata Li et Zhang, 2012

Species of moth

Scaeosopha spinivalvata is a species of moth of the family Cosmopterigidae. It is found in Sabah on Borneo.

The wingspan is about 12.5 mm.
