= Scaeosopha gibbosa =

Scientific classification
- Domain: Eukaryota
- Kingdom: Animalia
- Phylum: Arthropoda
- Class: Insecta
- Order: Lepidoptera
- Family: Cosmopterigidae
- Genus: Scaeosopha
- Species: S. gibbosa

Binomial name
- Scaeosopha gibbosa Li et Zhang, 2012

Species of moth

Scaeosopha gibbosa is a species of moth of the family Cosmopterigidae. It is found in Brunei.

The wingspan is 16.5–19 mm.
