= Scaeosopha trigonia =

Scientific classification
- Kingdom: Animalia
- Phylum: Arthropoda
- Class: Insecta
- Order: Lepidoptera
- Family: Cosmopterigidae
- Genus: Scaeosopha
- Species: S. trigonia

Binomial name
- Scaeosopha trigonia Li et Zhang, 2012

Species of moth

Scaeosopha trigonia is a species of moth of the family Cosmopterigidae.

== Distribution ==
It is found on Sulawesi, an island in Indonesia.

== Description ==
The wingspan is about 14.5 mm.
