= Triclonella aglaogramma =

Scientific classification
- Kingdom: Animalia
- Phylum: Arthropoda
- Class: Insecta
- Order: Lepidoptera
- Family: Cosmopterigidae
- Genus: Triclonella
- Species: T. aglaogramma

Binomial name
- Triclonella aglaogramma Meyrick, 1931

Species of moth

Triclonella aglaogramma is a moth in the family Cosmopterigidae. It is found in Brazil.
