= Scaeosopha chionoscia =

Scientific classification
- Kingdom: Animalia
- Phylum: Arthropoda
- Class: Insecta
- Order: Lepidoptera
- Family: Cosmopterigidae
- Genus: Scaeosopha
- Species: S. chionoscia

Binomial name
- Scaeosopha chionoscia Meyrick, 1933

Species of moth

Scaeosopha chionoscia is a species of moth of the family Cosmopterigidae. It is found in Brunei and on Java.

The wingspan is 14–17 mm.

The larvae have been reared on the fruits of Nauclea orientalis.
