= Dendrophilia yuexiensis =

Scientific classification
- Domain: Eukaryota
- Kingdom: Animalia
- Phylum: Arthropoda
- Class: Insecta
- Order: Lepidoptera
- Family: Gelechiidae
- Genus: Dentrophilia
- Species: D. yuexiensis

Binomial name
- Dendrophilia yuexiensis H.H. Li & Z.M. Zheng, 1998

Species of insect

Dendrophilia yuexiensis is a moth of the family Gelechiidae. It was described by H.H. Li and Z.M. Zheng in 1998. It is found in China (Anhui).
