= Dendrophilia caraganella =

Scientific classification
- Kingdom: Animalia
- Phylum: Arthropoda
- Class: Insecta
- Order: Lepidoptera
- Family: Gelechiidae
- Genus: Dentrophilia
- Species: D. caraganella

Binomial name
- Dendrophilia caraganella Ponomarenko, 1993

Species of moth

Dendrophilia caraganella is a moth of the family Gelechiidae. It was described by Ponomarenko in 1993. It is found in Russia (Primorskii krai).

The larvae feed on Caragana ussuriensis.
