= Scaeosopha erecta =

Scientific classification
- Domain: Eukaryota
- Kingdom: Animalia
- Phylum: Arthropoda
- Class: Insecta
- Order: Lepidoptera
- Family: Cosmopterigidae
- Genus: Scaeosopha
- Species: S. erecta

Binomial name
- Scaeosopha erecta Li & Zhang, 2012

Species of moth

Scaeosopha erecta is a species of moth of the family Cosmopterigidaefirst described by Li and Zhang in 2012. It is found in China.

The wingspan is about 13 mm.
