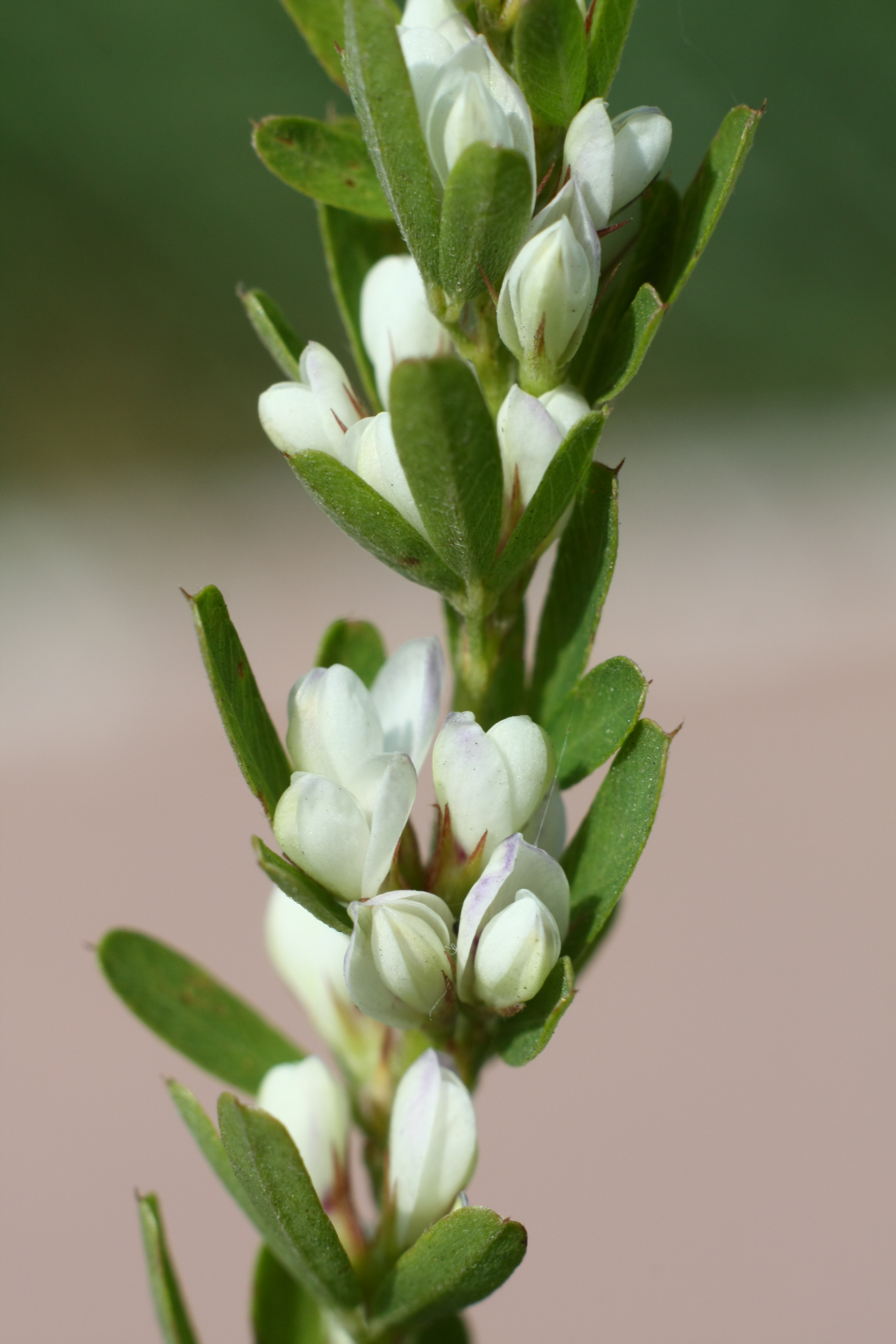

Conservation status
- Least Concern (IUCN 3.1)

Scientific classification
- Kingdom: Plantae
- Clade: Embryophytes
- Clade: Tracheophytes
- Clade: Spermatophytes
- Clade: Angiosperms
- Clade: Eudicots
- Clade: Rosids
- Order: Fabales
- Family: Fabaceae
- Subfamily: Faboideae
- Genus: Lespedeza
- Species: L. cuneata

Binomial name
- Lespedeza cuneata (Dum.Cours.) G.Don (1832)

Synonyms
- Anthyllis cuneata Dum.Cours. (1811); Aspalathus cuneata (Dum.Cours.) D.Don (1825)

= Lespedeza cuneata =

Species of legume

Lespedeza cuneata is a species of flowering plant in the legume family known by the common names Chinese bushclover and sericea lespedeza, or just sericea. It is native to Asia and is present elsewhere as an introduced species and sometimes an invasive plant. Australian populations of Lespedeza juncea have sometimes been considered to belong to this species but are now considered to be distinct.

== Description ==
This plant is a perennial herb with branching stems reaching a maximum height around two meters. It grows from a woody taproot which may exceed one meter in length and which is topped with a woody caudex. The stems are covered densely in leaves, which are each divided into leaflets up to 2.5 centimetres (1 inch) long. Flowers occur singly or in clusters of up to three in the leaf axils. Some of the flowers are cleistogamous, remaining closed and self-pollinating. The open flowers are purple, cream, white, or yellowish in color. The fruit is a legume pod containing one seed.

== Distribution ==
Lespedeza cuneata is native to eastern Asia and is also found in India, Pakistan, Afghanistan and Australia. L. cuneata can be found by the roadside on mountain slopes and usually grows below an altitude of 2500 meters.

This plant has been introduced to the United States, South Africa, Brazil, Canada, and Mexico. It was first planted in the US in North Carolina in 1896. It was used to control erosion and to revegetate abandoned mine sites and was used as forage for livestock. It was useful in areas susceptible to drought because its deep roots can keep it alive. A number of cultivars have been developed, including 'Arlington', 'Serala', 'AU Lotan', 'AU Donnelly', 'AU Grazer', and 'Interstate'.

== Invasive species ==
The plant is considered invasive in many areas such as the tallgrass prairie in the Flint Hills of Kansas. When it invades a habitat it reduces the abundance and diversity of native plants and can make the area less attractive to wildlife. It may inhibit the growth of tree seedlings. It may be allelopathic, producing substances that chemically inhibit the growth of other plants. The species also features on the European list of invasive alien species. It is now illegal to sell, transport and breed this plant in the whole of the European Union.

Possible biological pest control agents include the Lespedeza webworm (Tetralopha scortealis). It will probably not be approved for use, however, because it does not discriminate between native and invasive Lespedezas. Grazing may also be a way to control the plant, especially by goats.

== Noxious weed laws ==
=== United States ===
At least the following states have restrictions on this plant: Colorado, Kansas, Missouri, Nebraska, and New York.

== Gallery ==
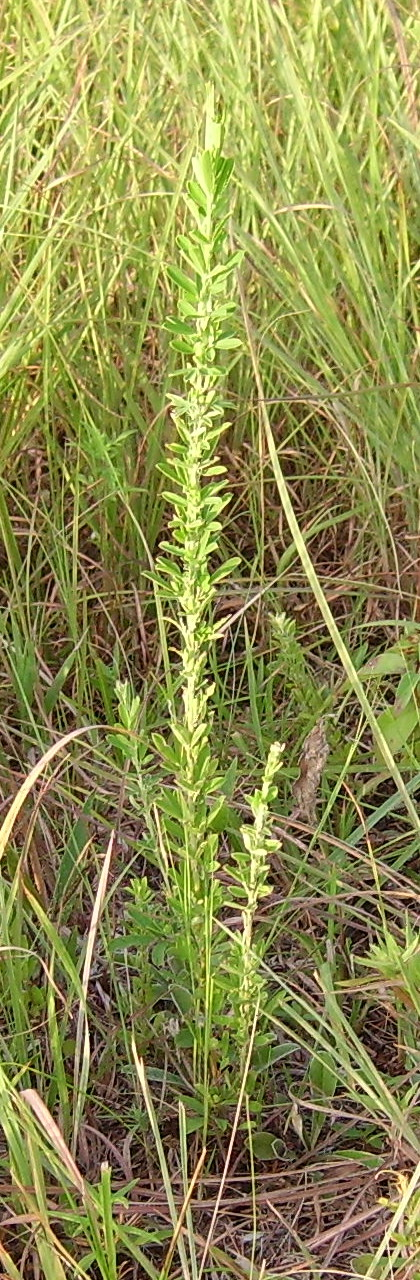
Lespedeza sericea plant growing in Kansas. This plant was 2 1/2 feet tall. Taken in September 2013.

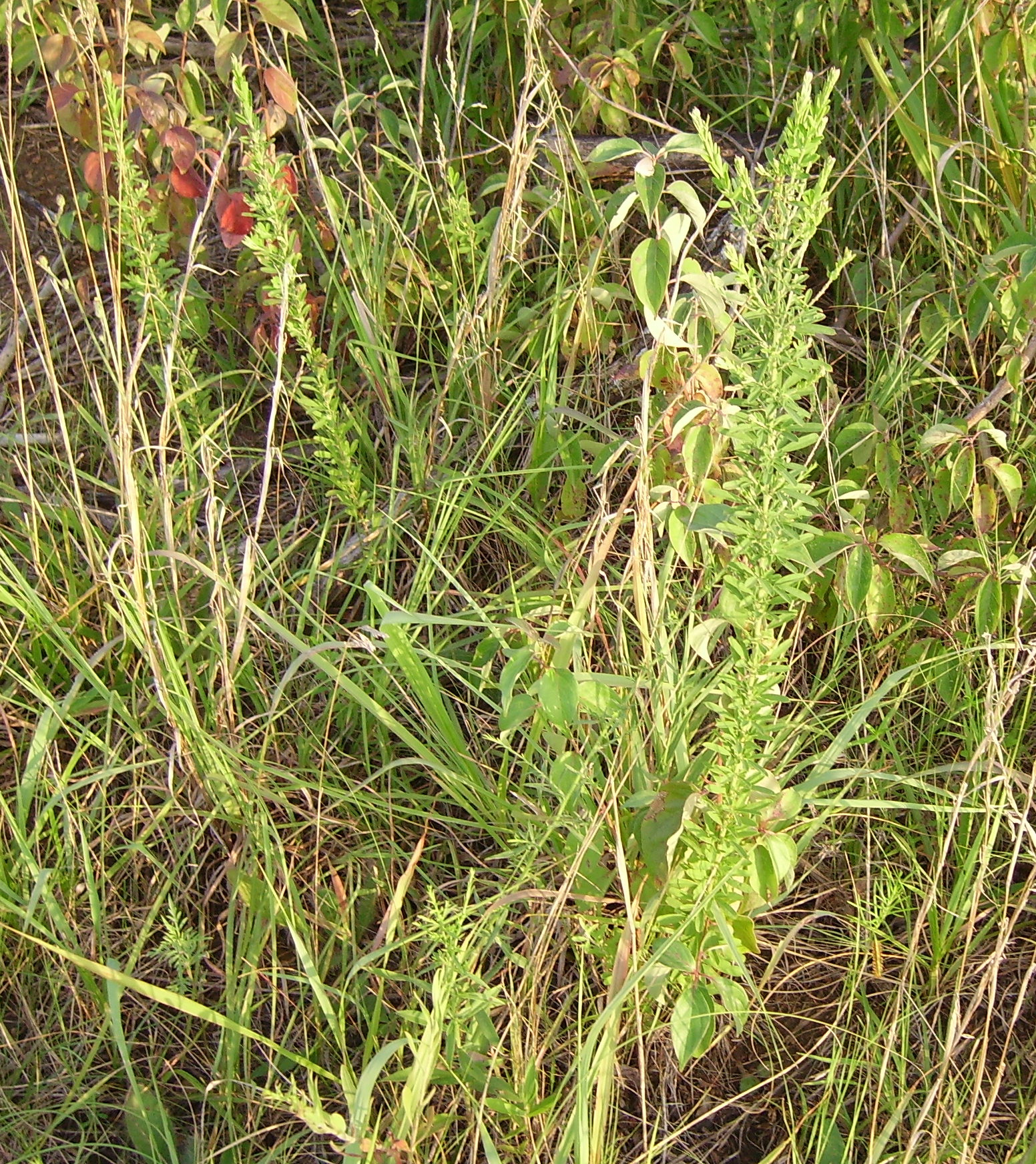
Lespedeza sericea plant growing in Kansas (with two more in the background). Taken in September 2013.

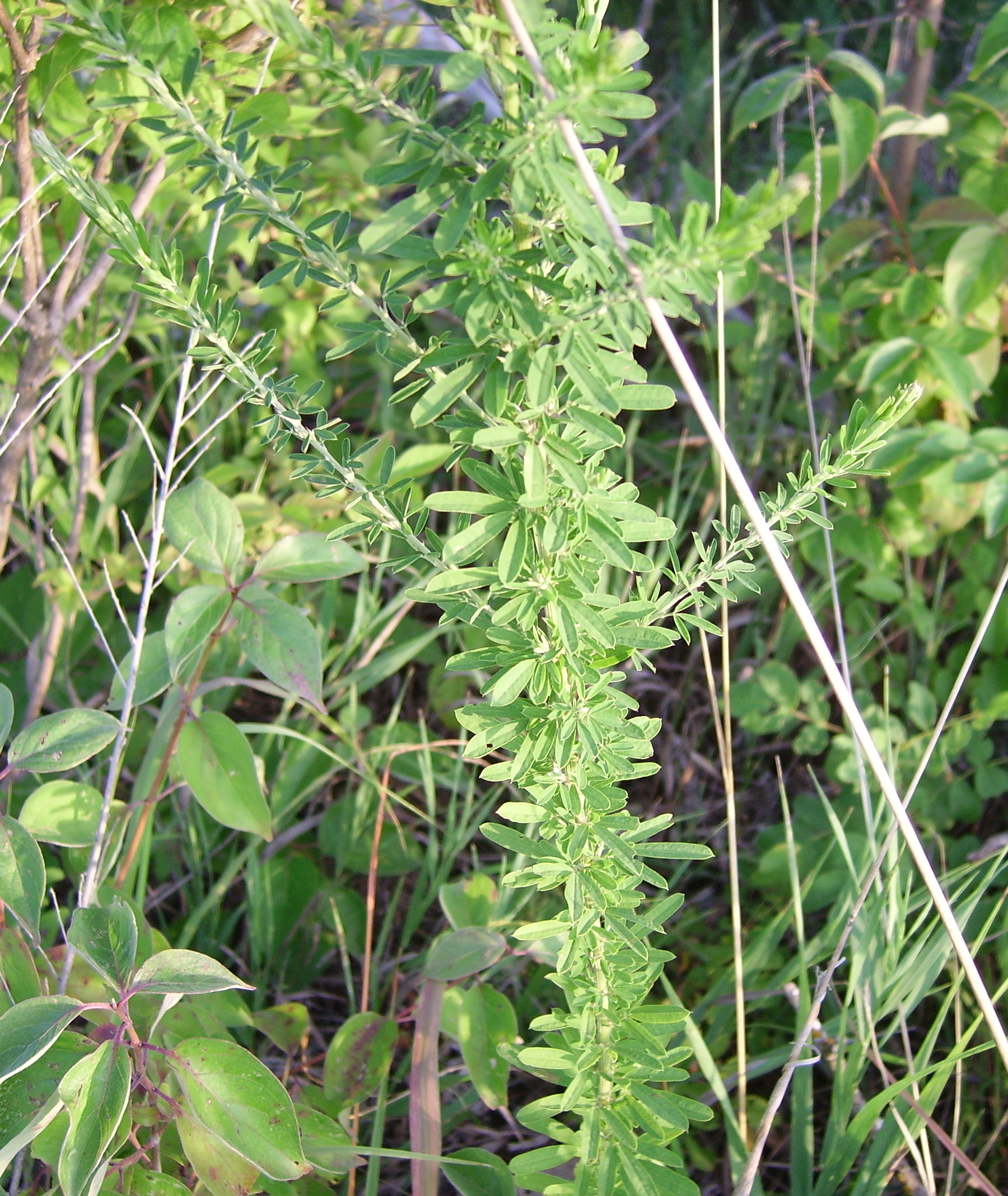
Lespedeza sericea plant up close. Shows the leaf pattern. Taken in September before the blooms started.
