= Scaeosopha hongkongensis =

Scientific classification
- Kingdom: Animalia
- Phylum: Arthropoda
- Clade: Pancrustacea
- Class: Insecta
- Order: Lepidoptera
- Family: Cosmopterigidae
- Genus: Scaeosopha
- Species: S. hongkongensis

Binomial name
- Scaeosopha hongkongensis Li et Zhang, 2012

Species of moth

Scaeosopha hongkongensis is a species of moth in the family Cosmopterigidae. It is found in China.

The wingspan is about 13 mm.

== Etymology ==
The species name refers to Hong Kong, the type locality.
