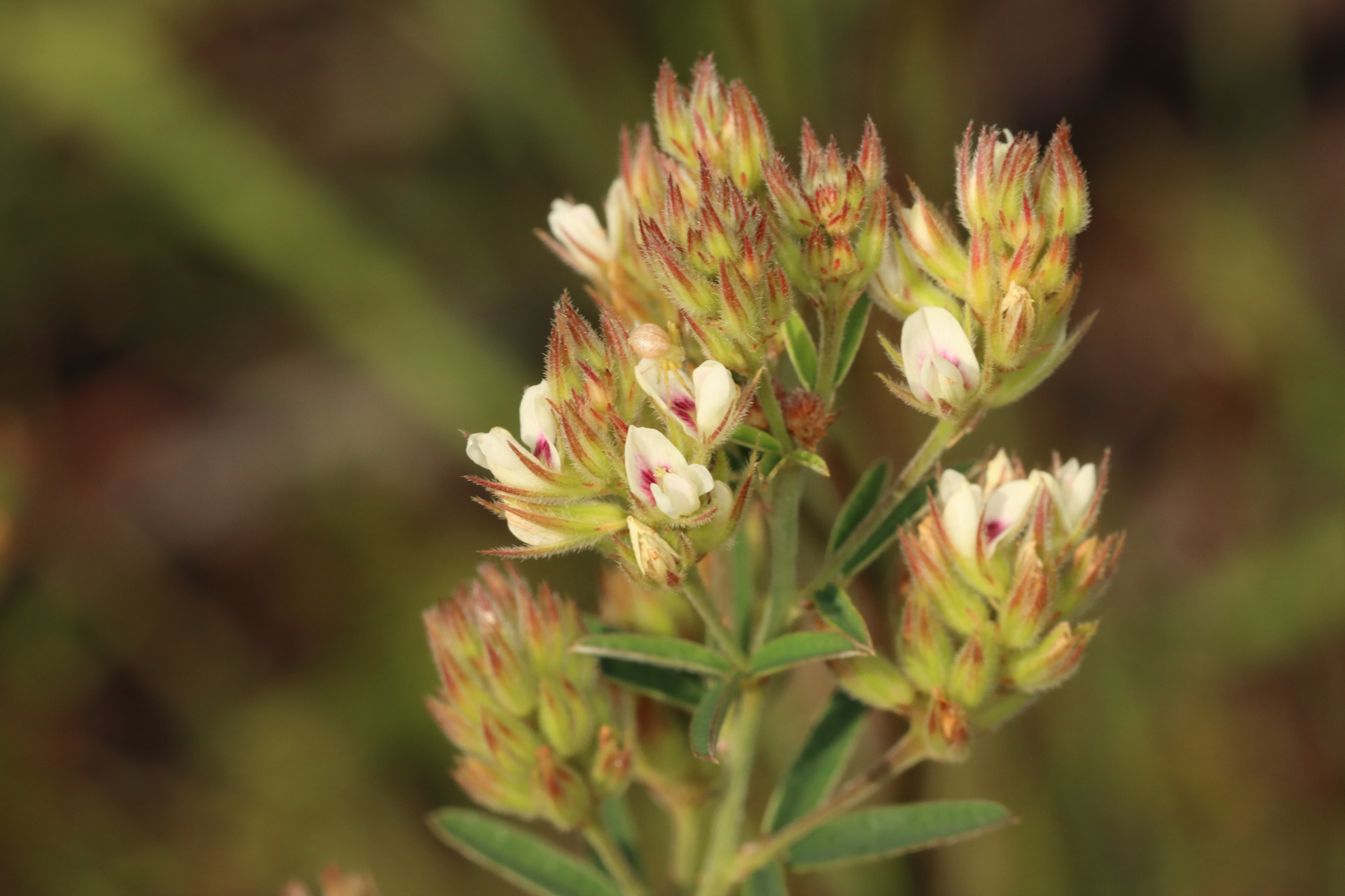

Conservation status
- Apparently Secure (NatureServe)

Scientific classification
- Kingdom: Plantae
- Clade: Tracheophytes
- Clade: Angiosperms
- Clade: Eudicots
- Clade: Rosids
- Order: Fabales
- Family: Fabaceae
- Subfamily: Faboideae
- Genus: Lespedeza
- Species: L. angustifolia

Binomial name
- Lespedeza angustifolia (Pursh) Elliott

Synonyms
- List: Despeleza angustifolia (Pursh) Nieuwl.; Lespedeza angustifolia f. subvelutina Fernald; Lespedeza angustifolia var. brevifolia Britton; Lespedeza capitata var. angustifolia Pursh; Lespedeza hirta var. angustifolia (Pursh) Maxim; Lespedeza hirta var. intercursa Fernald

= Lespedeza angustifolia =

Species of flowering plant

Lespedeza angustifolia, also known as narrow-leaved bushclover, is a perennial legume found in North America.

L. angustifolia reaches a height between 0.3 and 1.2 m (1 ft 0 in and 3 ft 11 in). The leaves are pinnate, trifoliate, and range in length between 2 and 6 cm (0.79 and 2.36 in). Flowers may have four or five petals, purple to white in color. When fruit is produced it is elliptic to oblong-obovate in shape and 4 to 6 mm (0.16 to 0.24 in) in length.

This species is considered to be endemic to the United States' Coastal Plain region, its range covering Massachusetts to Florida and west to Mississippi. There are disjunct populations in Georgia, Tennessee, and North Carolina.

L. angustifolia is commonly found in hydric environments, as it possesses a high tolerance for inundated soils.
