= Scaeosopha minuta =

Scientific classification
- Kingdom: Animalia
- Phylum: Arthropoda
- Clade: Pancrustacea
- Class: Insecta
- Order: Lepidoptera
- Family: Cosmopterigidae
- Genus: Scaeosopha
- Species: S. minuta

Binomial name
- Scaeosopha minuta Sinev et Li, 2012

Species of moth

Scaeosopha minuta is a species of moth of the family Cosmopterigidae. It is found on Borneo and Sulawesi.

The wingspan is 8.5–10 mm.
