= Dendrophilia (moth) =

Scientific classification
- Kingdom: Animalia
- Phylum: Arthropoda
- Class: Insecta
- Order: Lepidoptera
- Family: Gelechiidae
- Tribe: Chelariini
- Genus: Dentrophilia; Ponomarenko, 1993

Type species
- Northris albidella Snellen, 1884

Synonyms
- Dentrophilia Li & Zheng, 1998

Genus of moths

Dendrophilia is a genus of moths in the family Gelechiidae.

== Distribution ==
Russia, Korea, Japan, China, Taiwan, India and Indonesia (Java).

== Species ==
- Subgenus Dendrophilia
  - Dendrophilia acris Park, 1995
  - Dendrophilia albidella (Snellen, 1884)
  - Dendrophilia caraganella Ponomarenko, 1993
  - Dendrophilia fujianensis H.H. Li & Z.M. Zheng, 1998
  - Dendrophilia grandimacularis H.H. Li & Z.M. Zheng, 1998
  - Dendrophilia henanensis H.H. Li & Z.M. Zheng, 1998
  - Dendrophilia hetaeropsis (Meyrick, 1935)
  - Dendrophilia leguminella Ponomarenko, 1993
  - Dendrophilia mediofasciana (Park, 1991)
  - Dendrophilia neotaphronoma Ponomarenko, 1993 (=Dendrophilia obscurella Park, 1993)
  - Dendrophilia saxigera Meyrick, 1931
  - Dendrophilia solitaria Ponomarenko, 1993
  - Dendrophilia sophora H.H. Li & Z.M. Zheng, 1998
  - Dendrophilia stictocosma (Meyrick, 1920)
  - Dendrophilia taphronoma (Meyrick, 1932)
  - Dendrophilia tetragama (Meyrick, 1935)
  - Dendrophilia unicolorella Ponomarenko, 1993
  - Dendrophilia yifengensis H.H. Li & Z.M. Zheng, 1998
  - Dendrophilia yuanjiangensis H.H. Li & Z.M. Zheng, 1998
  - Dendrophilia yuexiensis H.H. Li & Z.M. Zheng, 1998
  - Dendrophilia yushanica H.H. Li & Z.M. Zheng, 1998
- Subgenus Microdendrophilia Ponomarenko, 1993
  - Dendrophilia petrinopsis (Meyrick, 1935)
