= Triclonella sequella =

Scientific classification
- Domain: Eukaryota
- Kingdom: Animalia
- Phylum: Arthropoda
- Class: Insecta
- Order: Lepidoptera
- Family: Cosmopterigidae
- Genus: Triclonella
- Species: T. sequella

Binomial name
- Triclonella sequella Busck, 1914

Species of moth

Triclonella sequella is a moth in the family Cosmopterigidae. It is found in Panama and Colombia.
