= Dendrophilia albidella =

Scientific classification
- Kingdom: Animalia
- Phylum: Arthropoda
- Class: Insecta
- Order: Lepidoptera
- Family: Gelechiidae
- Genus: Dentrophilia
- Species: D. albidella

Binomial name
- Dendrophilia albidella (Snellen, 1884)

Synonyms
- Nothris albidella Snellen, 1884; Dactylethra albidella

Species of moth

Dendrophilia albidella is a moth of the family Gelechiidae. It was described by Snellen in 1884. It is found in Russia (central and southern Siberia and Primorskii krai).
