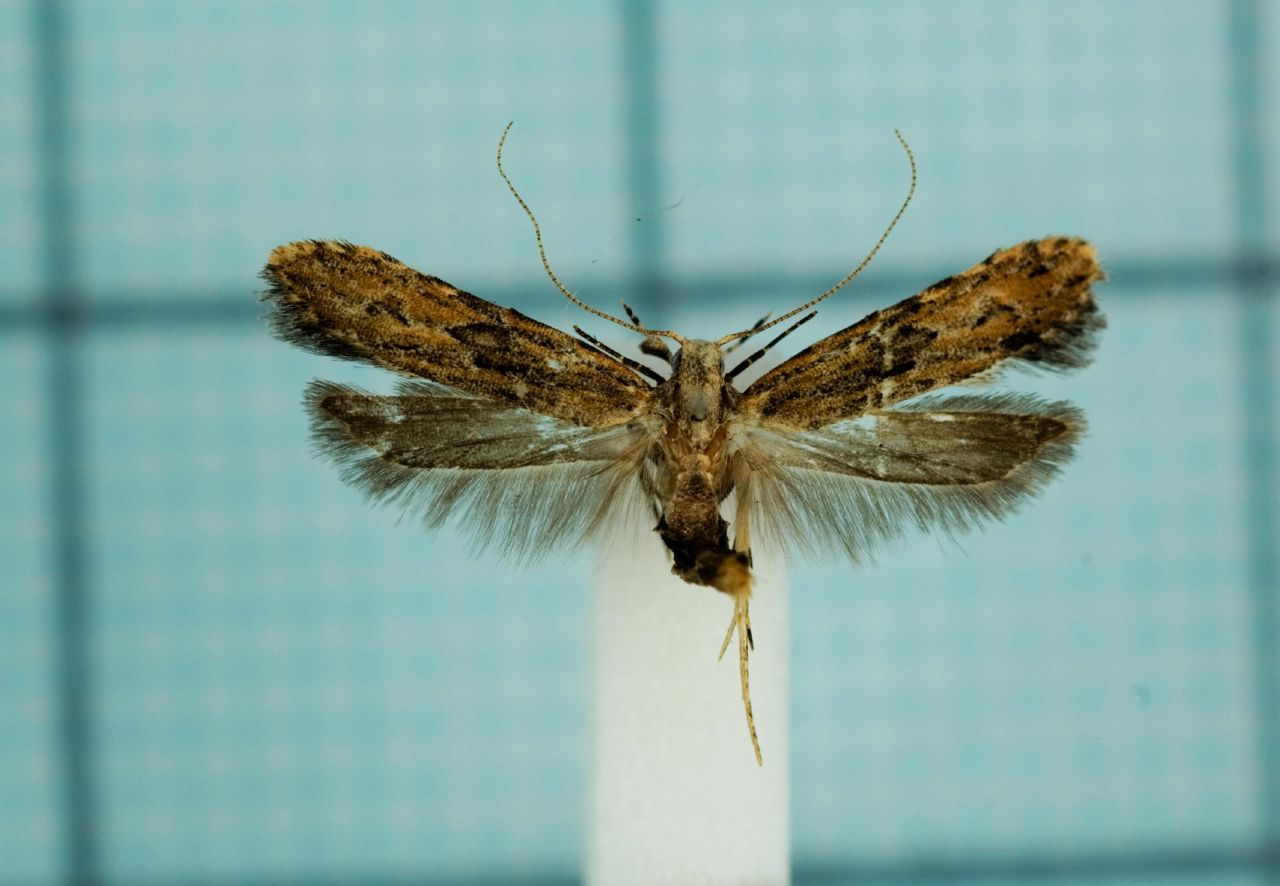

Scientific classification
- Kingdom: Animalia
- Phylum: Arthropoda
- Class: Insecta
- Order: Lepidoptera
- Family: Gelechiidae
- Genus: Dentrophilia
- Species: D. petrinopsis

Binomial name
- Dendrophilia petrinopsis (Meyrick, 1935)

Synonyms
- Chelaria petrinopis Meyrick, 1935; Hypatima petrinopis

= Dendrophilia petrinopsis =

Species of moth

Dendrophilia petrinopsis is a moth of the family Gelechiidae. It is found in Russia (Primorsky Krai), Japan (Honshu) and Taiwan.
