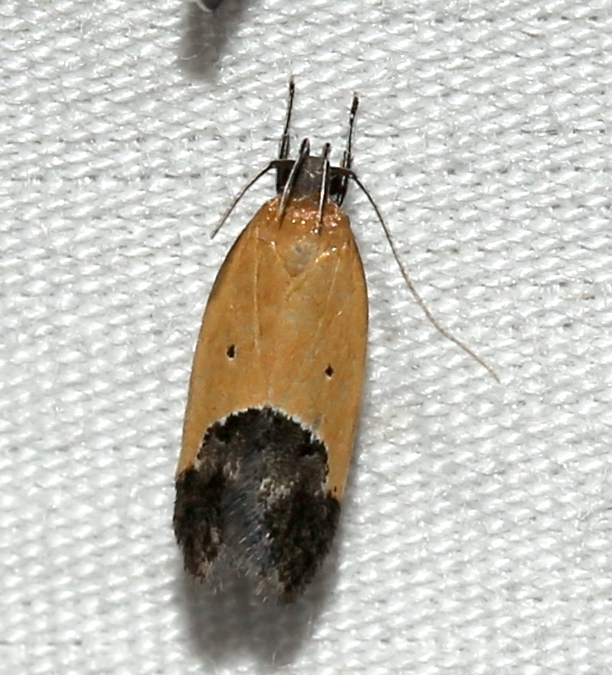

Scientific classification
- Kingdom: Animalia
- Phylum: Arthropoda
- Class: Insecta
- Order: Lepidoptera
- Family: Cosmopterigidae
- Genus: Triclonella
- Species: T. pergandeella

Binomial name
- Triclonella pergandeella Busck, [1901]

= Triclonella pergandeella =

Species of moth

Triclonella pergandeella, the sweetclover root borer moth, is a moth in the family Cosmopterigidae. It is found in the United States, where it has been recorded from the District of Columbia, from Arkansas to Florida, Louisiana and Texas.

The wingspan is about 14 mm. Adults have been recorded on wing from March to October.

The larvae feed on Lespedeza and Clitoria species. Full-grown larvae reach a length of about 12 mm. The head is yellow.
