= Scaeosopha sinevi =

Scientific classification
- Kingdom: Animalia
- Phylum: Arthropoda
- Class: Insecta
- Order: Lepidoptera
- Family: Cosmopterigidae
- Genus: Scaeosopha
- Species: S. sinevi

Binomial name
- Scaeosopha sinevi Ponomarenko et Park, 1997

Species of moth

Scaeosopha sinevi is a species of moth of the family Cosmopterigidae. It is found in China and Korea.

The wingspan is 17–19 mm.

The larvae have been recorded feeding on Gardenia jasminoides.
