= Scaeosopha nigrimarginata =

Scientific classification
- Domain: Eukaryota
- Kingdom: Animalia
- Phylum: Arthropoda
- Class: Insecta
- Order: Lepidoptera
- Family: Cosmopterigidae
- Genus: Scaeosopha
- Species: S. nigrimarginata

Binomial name
- Scaeosopha nigrimarginata Li et Zhang, 2012

Species of moth

Scaeosopha nigrimarginata is a species of moth of the family Cosmopterigidae. It is found in Brunei, China, Malaysia and Thailand.

The wingspan is 12.5–15.5 mm.
