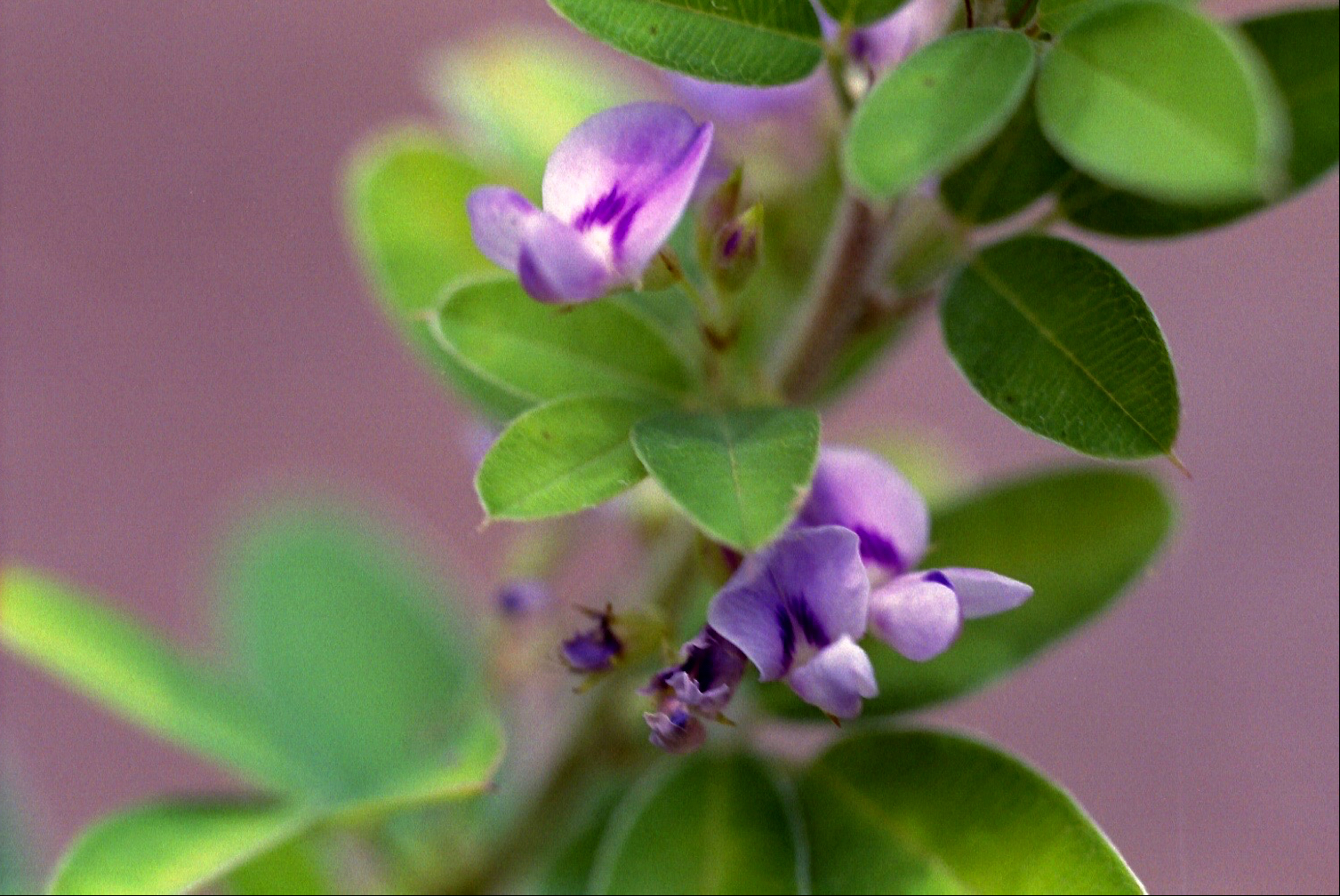

Conservation status
- Apparently Secure (NatureServe)

Scientific classification
- Kingdom: Plantae
- Clade: Tracheophytes
- Clade: Angiosperms
- Clade: Eudicots
- Clade: Rosids
- Order: Fabales
- Family: Fabaceae
- Subfamily: Faboideae
- Genus: Lespedeza
- Species: L. stuevei

Binomial name
- Lespedeza stuevei Nutt.

Synonyms
- Lespedeza stuevei f. angustifolia (Britton) M.Hopkins; Lespedeza stuevei var. angustifolia Britton; Lespedeza virgata Nutt. ex Darl.

= Lespedeza stuevei =

Species of legume

Lespedeza stuevei, known commonly as tall bushclover, is a perennial legume native to North America. Its range encompasses the eastern half of the United States, stretching from Massachusetts to Florida and westward to Texas, where it is commonly found in woodlands and along woodland borders.

The stems of L. stuevei are erect. Leaves are pinnately trifoliate and alternately arranged. The flowers occur in dense groups and can possess either four or five petals, which are typically purple in color but can range from blue to pink to red. Fruit possesses one seed and ranges in size from 4 to 7 millimeters in length.

This species has been known to persist through repeated prescribed burns.
