= Scaeosopha grandannulata =

Scientific classification
- Domain: Eukaryota
- Kingdom: Animalia
- Phylum: Arthropoda
- Class: Insecta
- Order: Lepidoptera
- Family: Cosmopterigidae
- Genus: Scaeosopha
- Species: S. grandannulata

Binomial name
- Scaeosopha grandannulata Li et Zhang, 2012

Species of moth

Scaeosopha grandannulata is a species of moth of the family Cosmopterigidae. It is found on Borneo and Sumatra.

The wingspan is 14–14.5 mm.
