= Dendrophilia taphronoma =

Scientific classification
- Kingdom: Animalia
- Phylum: Arthropoda
- Class: Insecta
- Order: Lepidoptera
- Family: Gelechiidae
- Genus: Dentrophilia
- Species: D. taphronoma

Binomial name
- Dendrophilia taphronoma (Meyrick, 1932)

Synonyms
- Chelaria taphronoma Meyrick, 1932

Species of moth

Dendrophilia taphronoma is a moth of the family Gelechiidae. It was described by Edward Meyrick in 1932. It is found in north-eastern India.
