= Scaeosopha incantata =

Scientific classification
- Kingdom: Animalia
- Phylum: Arthropoda
- Class: Insecta
- Order: Lepidoptera
- Family: Cosmopterigidae
- Genus: Scaeosopha
- Species: S. incantata

Binomial name
- Scaeosopha incantata Meyrick, 1928

Species of moth

Scaeosopha incantata is a species of moth of the family Cosmopterigidae. It is found in Brunei, India (the Andamans), Indonesia (Sumatra) and Malaysia.

The wingspan is 20–21 mm. The ground colour of the forewings is yellow.
