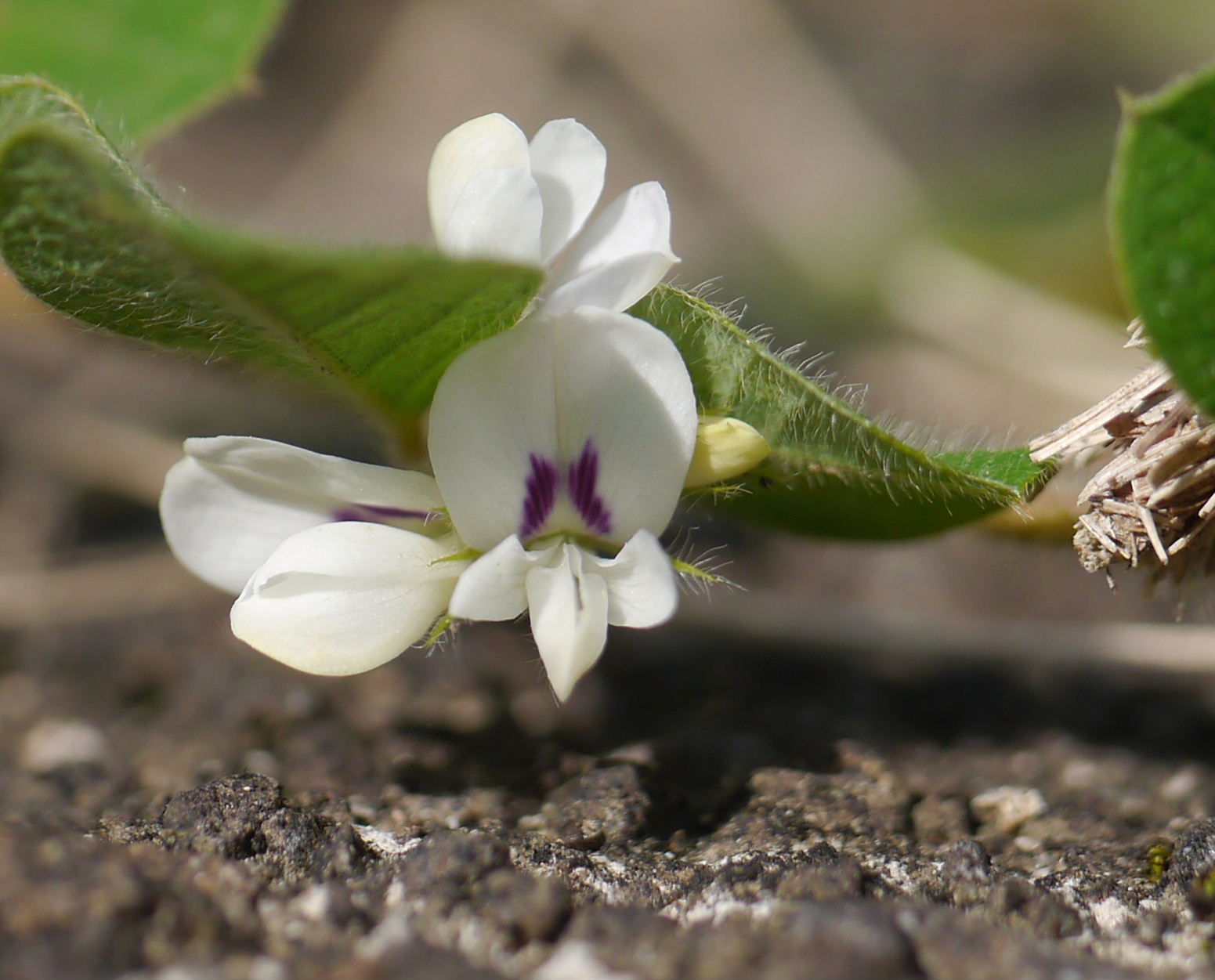
- Close-up of flower
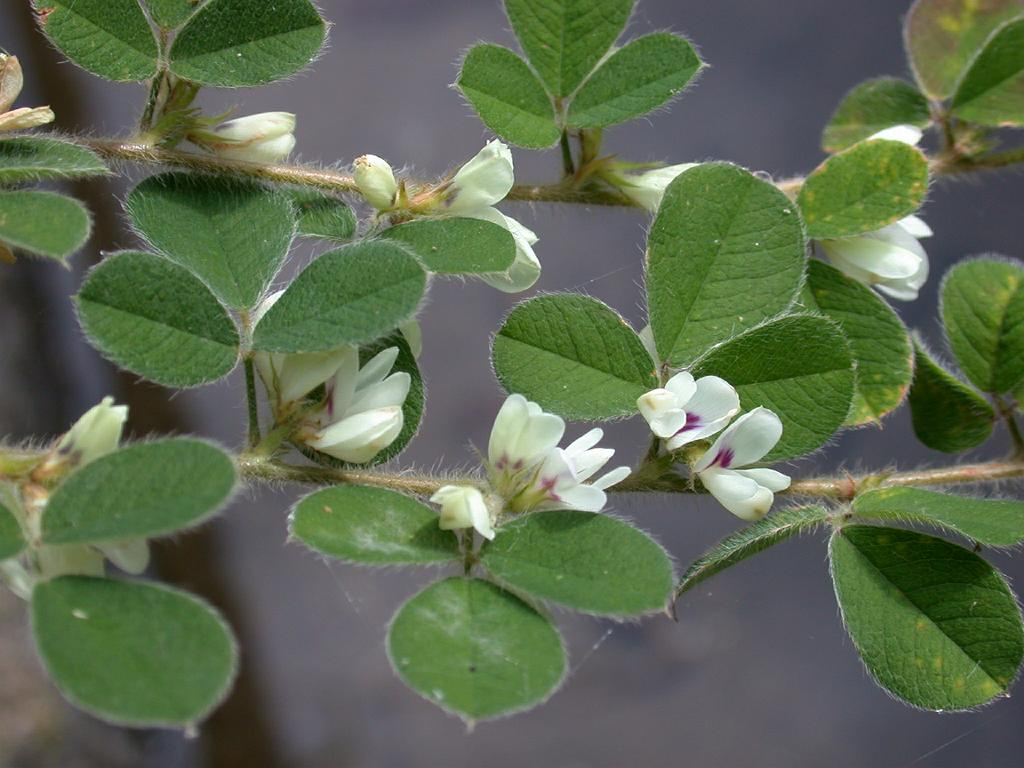
- In Tanabe, Japan

Scientific classification
- Kingdom: Plantae
- Clade: Tracheophytes
- Clade: Angiosperms
- Clade: Eudicots
- Clade: Rosids
- Order: Fabales
- Family: Fabaceae
- Subfamily: Faboideae
- Genus: Lespedeza
- Species: L. pilosa

Binomial name
- Lespedeza pilosa (Thunb.) Siebold & Zucc.

Synonyms
- Desmodium pilosum (Thunb.) DC.; Hedysarum pilosum Thunb.; Lespedeza nantcianensis Pamp.; Lespedeza pilosa var. latifolia Koidz.; Lespedeza pilosa var. pedunculata T.Lee; Lespedeza pilosa f. virginea H.Ohashi

= Lespedeza pilosa =

Species of plant

Lespedeza pilosa is a species of flowering plant in the family Fabaceae. It is native to Tibet, central and southern China, Korea, central and southern Japan, and the Ryukyu Islands. A procumbent perennial with stems reaching 1 m (3 ft), it is typically found on wasteland slopes and in grassy areas at elevations below 1,000 m (3,300 ft).

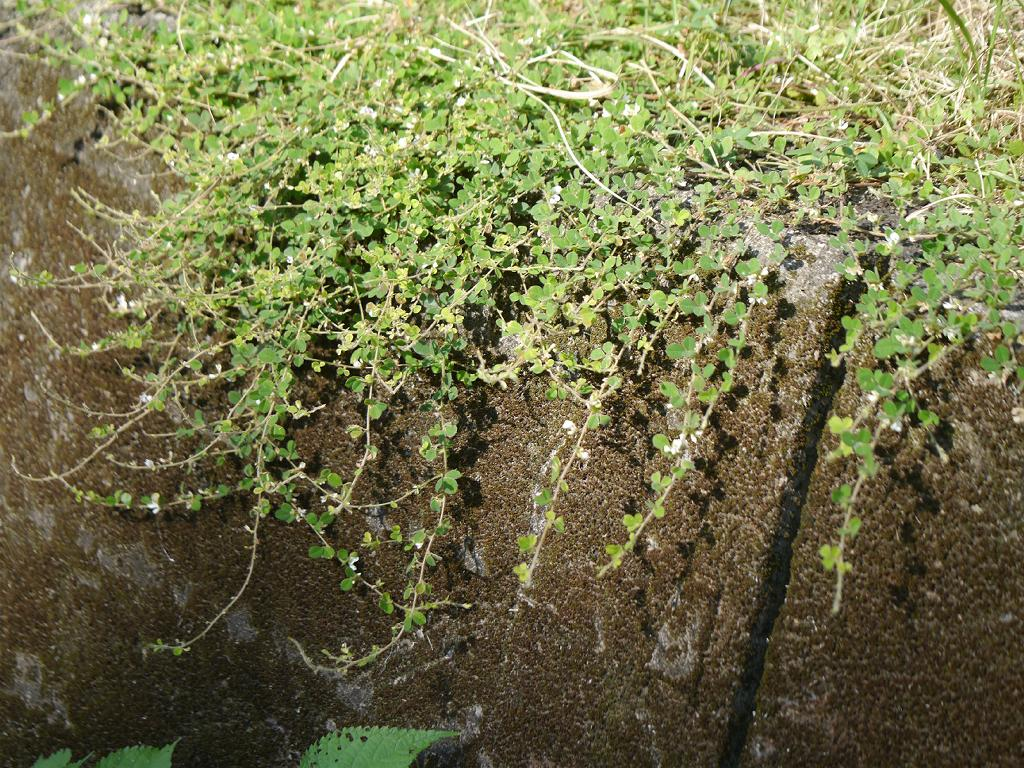
Draping over a wall
