= Dendrophilia solitaria =

Scientific classification
- Kingdom: Animalia
- Phylum: Arthropoda
- Class: Insecta
- Order: Lepidoptera
- Family: Gelechiidae
- Genus: Dentrophilia
- Species: D. solitaria

Binomial name
- Dendrophilia solitaria Ponomarenko, 1993

Species of moth

Dendrophilia solitaria is a moth of the family Gelechiidae. It was described by Ponomarenko in 1993. It is found in Russia (Primorskii krai).
