= Scaeosopha mitescens =

Scientific classification
- Domain: Eukaryota
- Kingdom: Animalia
- Phylum: Arthropoda
- Class: Insecta
- Order: Lepidoptera
- Family: Cosmopterigidae
- Genus: Scaeosopha
- Species: S. mitescens

Binomial name
- Scaeosopha mitescens (Lucas, 1901)

Synonyms
- Eulechria mitescens Lucas, 1901; Acompsia epileuca Lower, 1901; Scaeosopha epileuca

Species of moth

Scaeosopha mitescens is a species of moth of the family Cosmopterigidae. It is found in Australia, where it has been recorded from Queensland and South Australia.

The wingspan is 16–18 mm.
