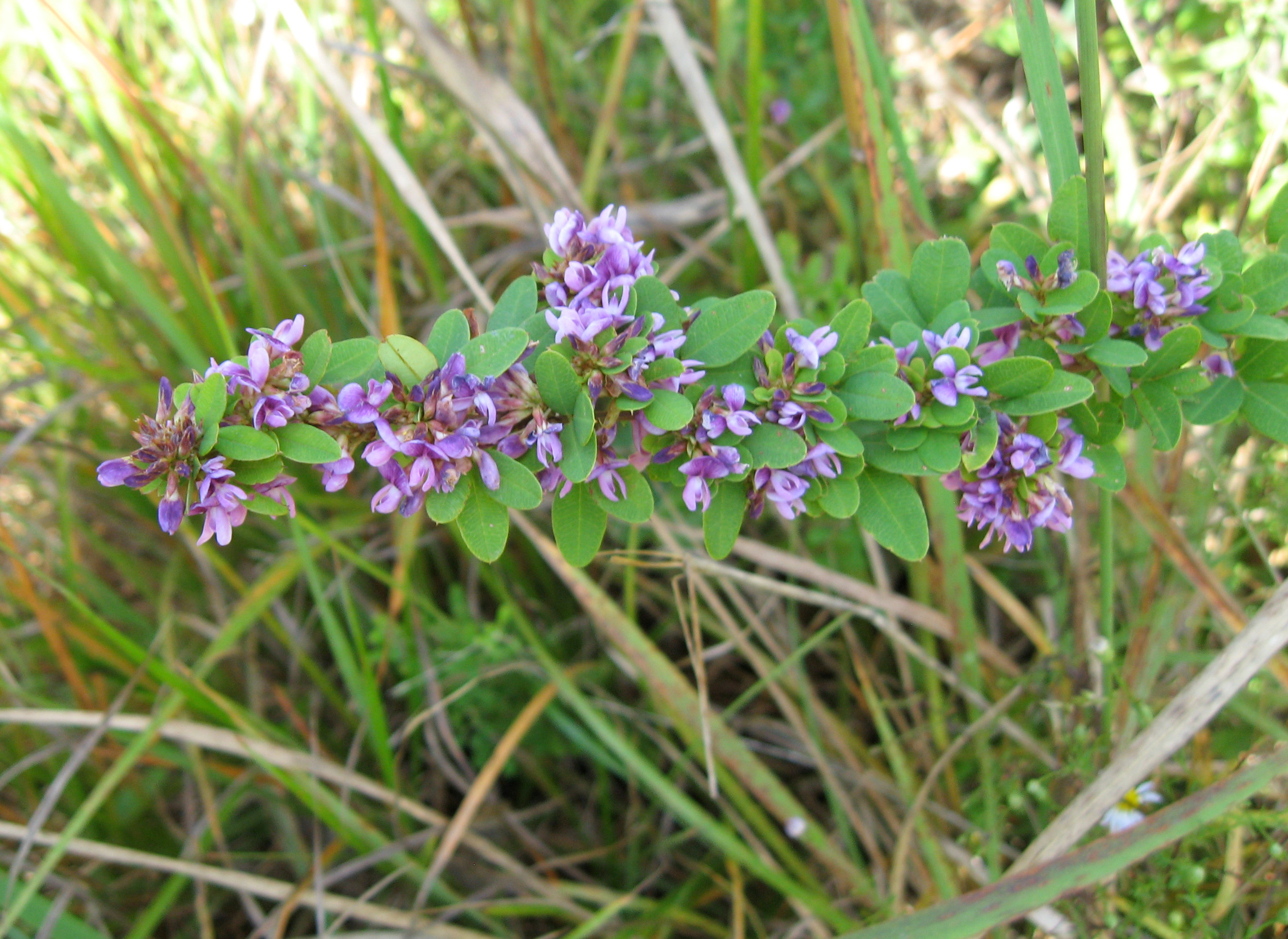

Scientific classification
- Kingdom: Plantae
- Clade: Tracheophytes
- Clade: Angiosperms
- Clade: Eudicots
- Clade: Rosids
- Order: Fabales
- Family: Fabaceae
- Subfamily: Faboideae
- Genus: Lespedeza
- Species: L. violacea

Binomial name
- Lespedeza violacea (L.) Pers. (1807)

Synonyms
- Hedysarum divergens Muhl. ex Willd. (1803); Hedysarum violaceum L. (1753); Lespedeza intermedia (S.Watson) Britton (1893); Lespedeza intermedia f. hahnii (S.F.Blake) M.Hopkins (1935); Lespedeza intermedia var. hahnii S.F.Blake (1924); Lespedeza prairea Britton (1903); Lespedeza stuevei var. intermedia S.Watson (1890); Lespedeza violacea var. divergens (Muhl. ex Willd.) G.Don (1832); Lespedeza violacea var. prairea Mack. & Bush (1902)

= Lespedeza violacea =

Species of legume

Lespedeza violacea, commonly known as wand lespedeza or violet lespedeza, is a species of herbaceous plant in the legume family.

It is native to eastern North America, where it is widespread. It is found in woodlands, savannas, prairies, and other sunny habitats. It is a perennial species that produces flowers in mid-summer.

Lespedeza violacea is known to hybridize with a number of other closely related Lespedeza in the wild.

== Taxonomy ==
Recent taxonomic work has changed the entity the name Lespedeza violacea applies to. Based upon a reexamination of the type specimens, it was determined that Lespedeza violacea is the correct name of what was traditionally known as Lespedeza intermedia. The entity traditionally known as Lespedeza violacea now has the name Lespedeza frutescens. This nomenclature rearrangement has resulted in widespread confusion among botanists, with older references and some modern botanists retaining the traditional usage. Literature referencing L. violacea must be carefully checked to determine what concept of the species the author is using.
