= Scaeosopha atrinervis =

Scientific classification
- Kingdom: Animalia
- Phylum: Arthropoda
- Class: Insecta
- Order: Lepidoptera
- Family: Cosmopterigidae
- Genus: Scaeosopha
- Species: S. atrinervis

Binomial name
- Scaeosopha atrinervis Meyrick, 1931

Species of moth

Scaeosopha atrinervis is a species of moth of the family Cosmopterigidae. It is found in Vietnam.
