= Triclonella antidectis =

Scientific classification
- Kingdom: Animalia
- Phylum: Arthropoda
- Class: Insecta
- Order: Lepidoptera
- Family: Cosmopterigidae
- Genus: Triclonella
- Species: T. antidectis

Binomial name
- Triclonella antidectis (Meyrick, 1914)

Synonyms
- Epicallima antidectis Meyrick, 1914; Schiffermulleria antidectis

Species of moth

Triclonella antidectis is a moth in the family Cosmopterigidae. It is found in Arizona and Mexico.

Adults have been recorded on wing from April to July.
