= Triclonella platyxantha =

Scientific classification
- Kingdom: Animalia
- Phylum: Arthropoda
- Class: Insecta
- Order: Lepidoptera
- Family: Cosmopterigidae
- Genus: Triclonella
- Species: T. platyxantha

Binomial name
- Triclonella platyxantha (Meyrick, 1909)

Synonyms
- Promalactis platyxantha Meyrick, 1909; Anorcota platyxantha

Species of moth

Triclonella platyxantha is a moth in the family Cosmopterigidae. It is found in Central and South America.
