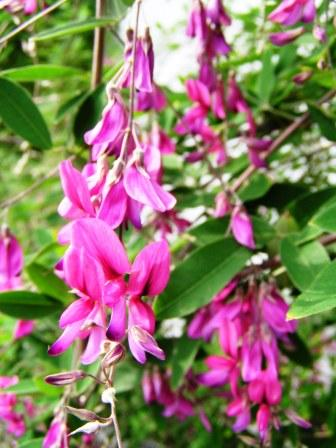

Scientific classification
- Kingdom: Plantae
- Clade: Tracheophytes
- Clade: Angiosperms
- Clade: Eudicots
- Clade: Rosids
- Order: Fabales
- Family: Fabaceae
- Subfamily: Faboideae
- Genus: Lespedeza
- Species: L. thunbergii

Binomial name
- Lespedeza thunbergii (DC.) Nakai (1927)

Subspecies
- 5; see text

Synonyms
- Desmodium thunbergii DC. (1825); Hedysarum heterocarpon Thunb. (1784), sensu auct.

= Lespedeza thunbergii =

Species of legume

Lespedeza thunbergii is a species of flowering plant in the legume family known by the common names Thunberg's bushclover, Thunberg's lespedeza, and shrub lespedeza. It is native to the eastern Himalayas, China, Korea, and Japan.

== Plant description ==
This species produces annual stems up to 2 m (7 ft) tall and 0.5 in (1.3 cm) in diameter. They die back completely at the end of the season. The abundant pink to purplish flowers bloom in late summer. The fruit is a legume pod containing black seeds.

== Varieties ==
Five subspecies are accepted:

- Lespedeza thunbergii subsp. elliptica (Benth. ex Maxim.) H.Ohashi – eastern Himalayas to central China
- Lespedeza thunbergii subsp. formosa (Vogel) H.Ohashi – southeastern China, Taiwan, Korea, and Japan
- Lespedeza thunbergii subsp. patens (Nakai) H.Ohashi – Japan (northern and central Honshu)
- Lespedeza thunbergii subsp. satsumensis (Nakai) H.Ohashi – Japan (Kagoshima Prefecture)
- Lespedeza thunbergii subsp. thunbergii – central and southern China, Korea, central and southern Japan, and the Ryukyu Islands

== Nomenclature ==
The specific epithet thunbergii refers to the 18th-century Swedish botanist Carl Peter Thunberg.

== Awards ==
In cultivation this plant has gained the Royal Horticultural Society's Award of Garden Merit. Cultivars include 'VA-70', 'Amquail', 'White Fountain', and 'Gibraltar'.

== Issues ==
This species has the capacity to become invasive.
