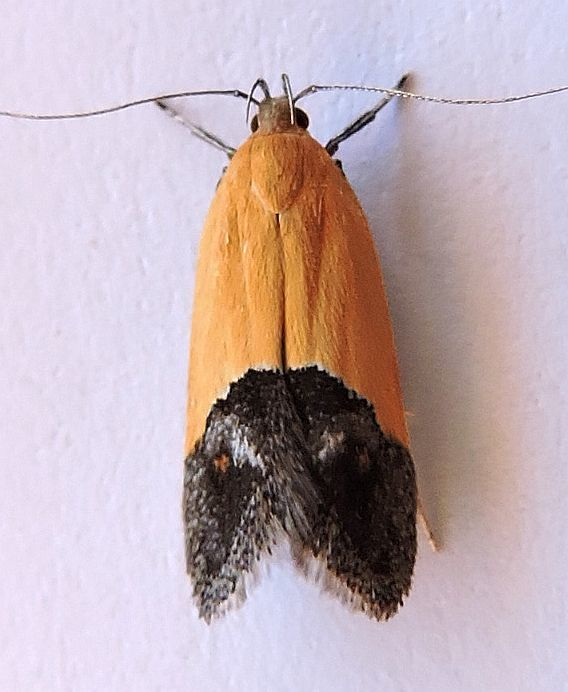

Scientific classification
- Domain: Eukaryota
- Kingdom: Animalia
- Phylum: Arthropoda
- Class: Insecta
- Order: Lepidoptera
- Family: Cosmopterigidae
- Genus: Triclonella
- Species: T. xuthocelis

Binomial name
- Triclonella xuthocelis Hodges, 1962

Synonyms
- Triclonella xuthoscelis

= Triclonella xuthocelis =

Species of moth

Triclonella xuthocelis is a moth in the family Cosmopterigidae. It is found in the mountains of southern Arizona and northern Mexico.

The length of the forewings is 6.3-7.7 mm.
