= Triclonella bicoloripennis =

Scientific classification
- Kingdom: Animalia
- Phylum: Arthropoda
- Clade: Pancrustacea
- Class: Insecta
- Order: Lepidoptera
- Family: Cosmopterigidae
- Genus: Triclonella
- Species: T. bicoloripennis

Binomial name
- Triclonella bicoloripennis Hodges, 1962

Species of moth

Triclonella bicoloripennis is a moth in the family Cosmopterigidae. It is found in North America, where it has been recorded from Louisiana, Mississippi, South Carolina and Texas.

The wingspan is about 11 mm. Adults have been recorded on wing from May to September.
