= Triclonella citrocarpa =

Scientific classification
- Kingdom: Animalia
- Phylum: Arthropoda
- Class: Insecta
- Order: Lepidoptera
- Family: Cosmopterigidae
- Genus: Triclonella
- Species: T. citrocarpa

Binomial name
- Triclonella citrocarpa (Meyrick, 1931)

Synonyms
- Scaeosopha citrocarpa Meyrick, 1931

Species of moth

Triclonella citrocarpa is a moth in the family Cosmopterigidae. It is found in Brazil (Mato Grosso do Sul, Santa Catarina, Espirito Santo)
