= Triclonella elliptica =

Scientific classification
- Domain: Eukaryota
- Kingdom: Animalia
- Phylum: Arthropoda
- Class: Insecta
- Order: Lepidoptera
- Family: Cosmopterigidae
- Genus: Triclonella
- Species: T. elliptica

Binomial name
- Triclonella elliptica Meyrick, 1916

Species of moth

Triclonella elliptica is a moth in the family Cosmopterigidae. It is found in Guyana and Brazil.

The wingspan is 18–20 mm. The forewings are rather deep ochreous-bronze with a slightly incurved white line from two-thirds of the costa to three-fourths of the dorsum, the area beyond this wholly blackish, finely irrorated with white except on a roundish blotch occupying the upper two-thirds of the termen. The terminal edge is finely white. The hindwings are grey becoming blackish-grey posteriorly, subhyaline in the cell and towards the base beneath the cell.
