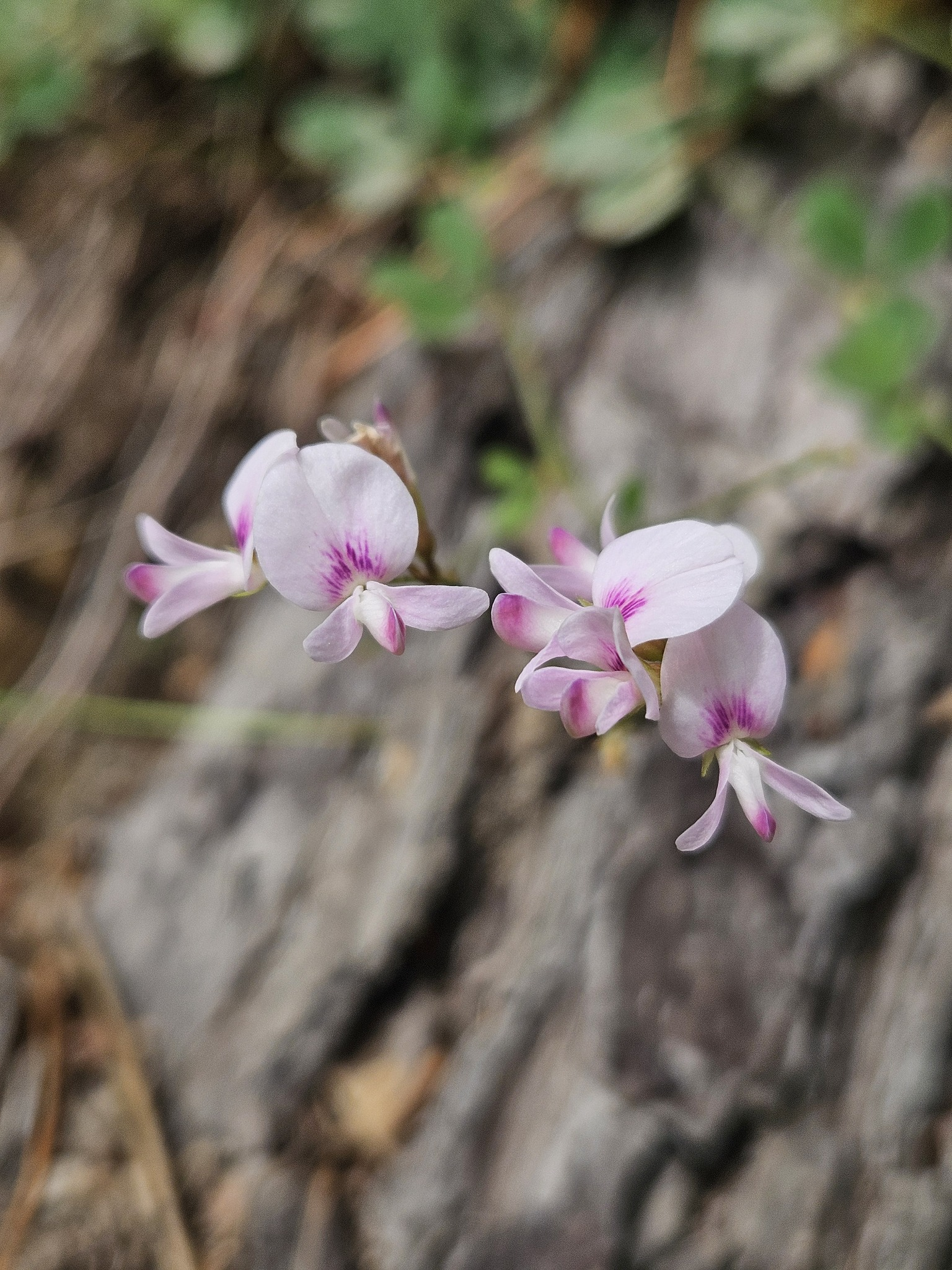

Scientific classification
- Kingdom: Plantae
- Clade: Tracheophytes
- Clade: Angiosperms
- Clade: Eudicots
- Clade: Rosids
- Order: Fabales
- Family: Fabaceae
- Subfamily: Faboideae
- Genus: Lespedeza
- Species: L. repens

Binomial name
- Lespedeza repens (L.) W.P.C.Barton (1815)

Synonyms
- Desmodium repens (L.) DC. (1825); Hedysarum lespedeza Poir. (1805); Hedysarum prostratum Muhl. ex Willd. (1803), not validly publ.; Lespedeza prostrata Pursh (1813); Hedysarum repens L. (1753)

= Lespedeza repens =

Species of legume

Lespedeza repens, common names creeping lespedeza, creeping bush-clover, and trailing lespedeza, is a plant native to the eastern and central United States and northeastern Mexico. It is listed as a species of special concern in Connecticut and as rare in New York. It is a perennial herb which blooms May to September. Its habitats include open woods, clearings, and thickets.

The stems of L. repens grow up to 1 meter (approximately 3.3 feet) in length. Its leaves get smaller as they progress towards the tips of the stem.
