= Triclonella albicellata =

Scientific classification
- Kingdom: Animalia
- Phylum: Arthropoda
- Class: Insecta
- Order: Lepidoptera
- Family: Cosmopterigidae
- Genus: Triclonella
- Species: T. albicellata

Binomial name
- Triclonella albicellata (Meyrick, 1931)

Synonyms
- Scaeosopha albicellata Meyrick, 1931

Species of moth

Triclonella albicellata is a moth in the family Cosmopterigidae. It is found in Brazil.
