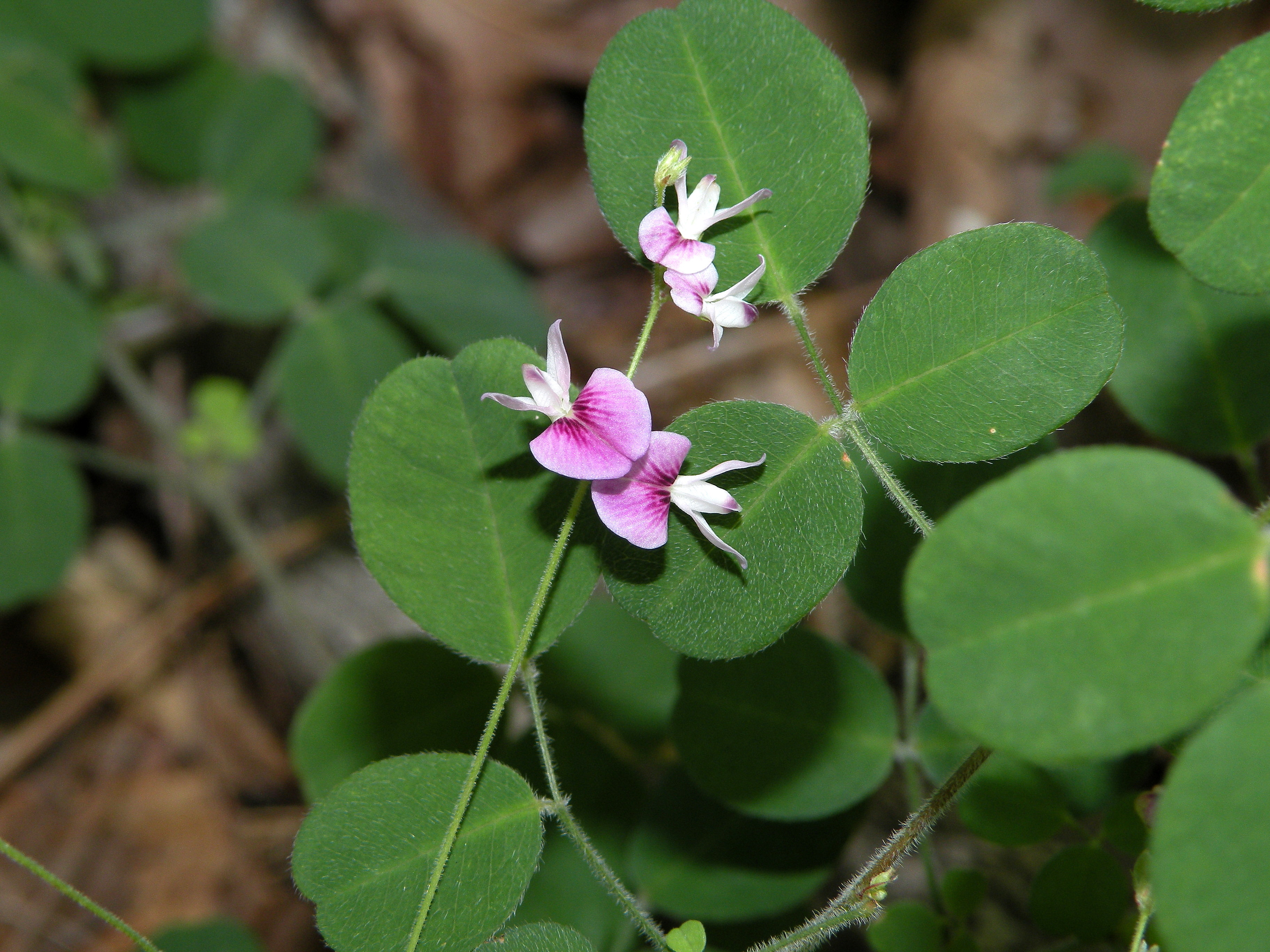

Conservation status
- Secure (NatureServe)

Scientific classification
- Kingdom: Plantae
- Clade: Tracheophytes
- Clade: Angiosperms
- Clade: Eudicots
- Clade: Rosids
- Order: Fabales
- Family: Fabaceae
- Subfamily: Faboideae
- Genus: Lespedeza
- Species: L. procumbens

Binomial name
- Lespedeza procumbens Michx.

= Lespedeza procumbens =

Species of legume

Lespedeza procumbens, commonly known as trailing bushclover, is a species of legume found in the eastern United States. The range of L. procumbens stretches from New York to Florida and westward to Texas, Oklahoma, and Kansas. It has been observed growing in habitats such as within forests, woodlands, on mountains, and in areas that had previously been disturbed.
