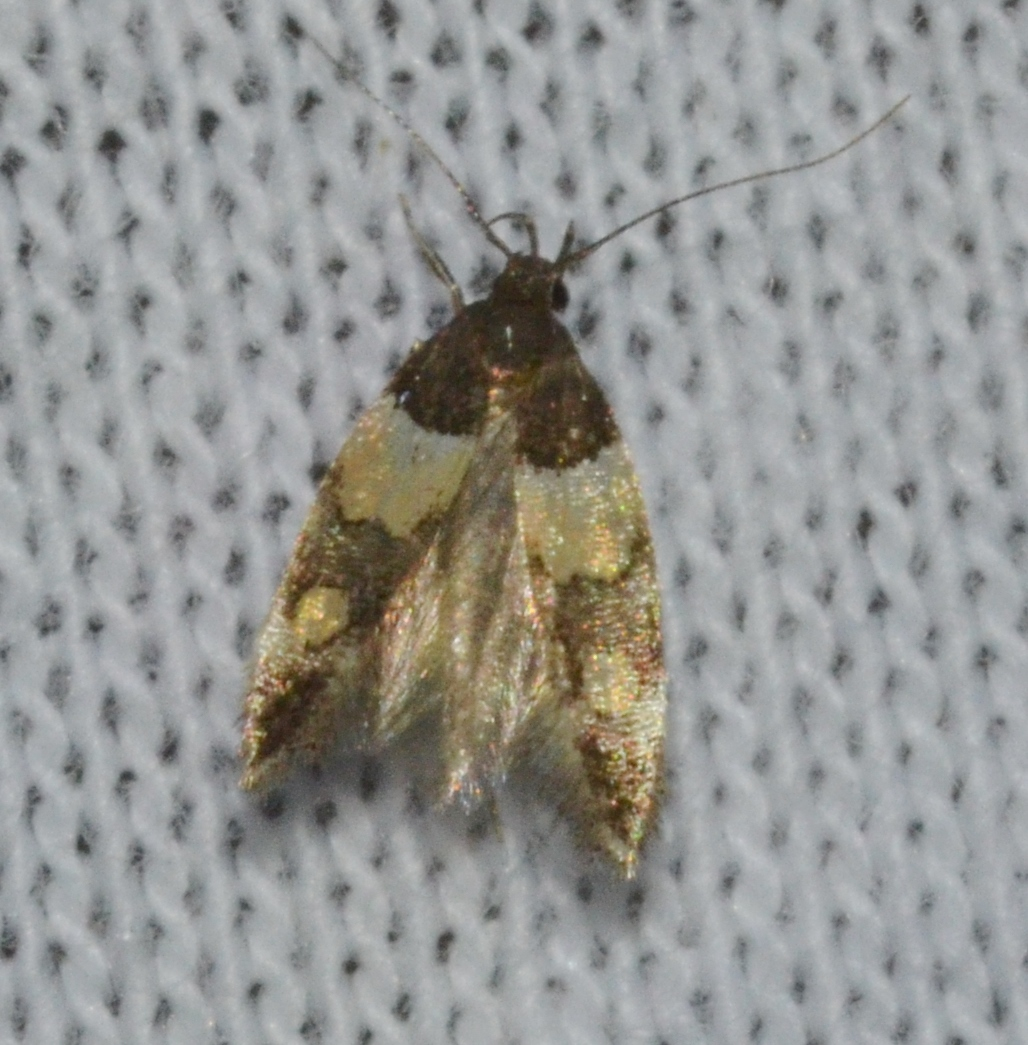

Scientific classification
- Kingdom: Animalia
- Phylum: Arthropoda
- Clade: Pancrustacea
- Class: Insecta
- Order: Lepidoptera
- Family: Cosmopterigidae
- Genus: Triclonella
- Species: T. determinatella

Binomial name
- Triclonella determinatella (Zeller, 1873)

Synonyms
- Oecophora determinatella Zeller, 1873; Oecophora australisella Chambers, 1875

= Triclonella determinatella =

Species of moth

Triclonella determinatella is a moth in the family Cosmopterigidae. It is found in North America, where it has been recorded from Alabama, Arkansas, Florida, Illinois, Kansas, Louisiana, Mississippi, Oklahoma and Texas.

The wingspan is about 10 mm. Adults have been recorded on wing in January and from March to October.
