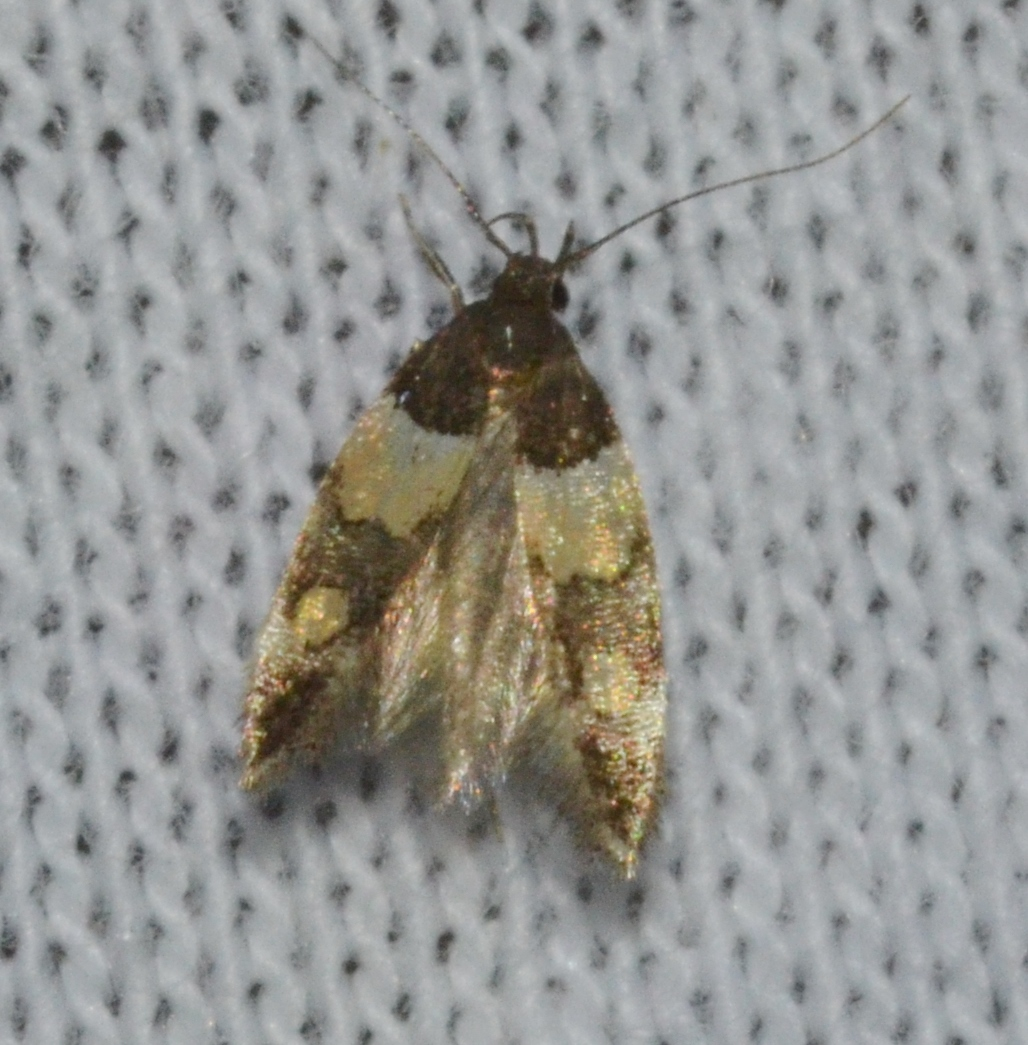
- Triclonella determinatella

Scientific classification
- Domain: Eukaryota
- Kingdom: Animalia
- Phylum: Arthropoda
- Class: Insecta
- Order: Lepidoptera
- Family: Cosmopterigidae
- Subfamily: Cosmopteriginae
- Genus: Triclonella; Walsingham, 1912

Synonyms
- Anorcota Meyrick, 1920; Pharmacoptis Meyrick, 1932

= Triclonella =

Genus of moths

Triclonella is a genus of moths in the family Cosmopterigidae.

== Species ==
- Triclonella albicellata (Meyrick, 1931)
- Triclonella aglaogramma Meyrick, 1931
- Triclonella antidectis (Meyrick, 1914)
- Triclonella bicoloripennis Hodges, 1962
- Triclonella calyptrodes Meyrick, 1922
- Triclonella chionozona Meyrick, 1931
- Triclonella citrocarpa (Meyrick, 1931)
- Triclonella cruciformis Meyrick, 1931
- Triclonella determinatella (Zeller, 1873) (syn: Triclonella australisella (Chambers, 1875))
- Triclonella diglypta Meyrick, 1931
- Triclonella elliptica Meyrick, 1916
- Triclonella etearcha Meyrick, 1920
- Triclonella euzosta Walsingham, 1912
- Triclonella iphicleia Meyrick, 1924
- Triclonella mediocris (Walsingham, 1897)
- Triclonella pergandeella Busck, 1901
- Triclonella philantha Meyrick, 1920
- Triclonella pictoria Meyrick, 1916
- Triclonella platyxantha (Meyrick, 1909)
- Triclonella sequella Busck, 1914
- Triclonella trachyxyla Meyrick, 1920
- Triclonella triargyra Meyrick, 1920
- Triclonella turbinalis Meyrick, 1933
- Triclonella umbrigera Meyrick, 1929
- Triclonella xanthota Walsingham, 1912
- Triclonella xuthocelis Hodges, 1962

== Selected former species ==
- Triclonella anachasta Meyrick, 1928
