= Triclonella mediocris =

Scientific classification
- Domain: Eukaryota
- Kingdom: Animalia
- Phylum: Arthropoda
- Class: Insecta
- Order: Lepidoptera
- Family: Cosmopterigidae
- Genus: Triclonella
- Species: T. mediocris

Binomial name
- Triclonella mediocris (Walsingham, 1897)

Synonyms
- Pigritia mediocris Walsingham, 1897; Pharmacoptis breviramis Meyrick, 1932; Triclonella rhabdophora Forbes, 1930

Species of moth

Triclonella mediocris is a moth in the family Cosmopterigidae. It is found on the Virgin Islands and Puerto Rico.
