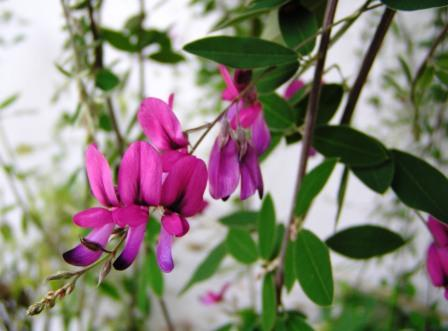
- Inflorescence and foliage of L. thunbergii

Scientific classification
- Kingdom: Plantae
- Clade: Embryophytes
- Clade: Tracheophytes
- Clade: Angiosperms
- Clade: Eudicots
- Clade: Rosids
- Order: Fabales
- Family: Fabaceae
- Subfamily: Faboideae
- Tribe: Desmodieae
- Subtribe: Lespedezinae
- Genus: Lespedeza; Michx. (1803)

Species
- about 45, see text

Synonyms
- Despeleza Nieuwl. (1914)

= Lespedeza =

Genus of flowering plants in the legume family

Lespedeza is a genus of some 45 species (including nothospecies) of flowering plants in the pea family (Fabaceae), commonly known as bush clovers or (particularly East Asian species) Japanese clovers (hagi). The genus is native to warm temperate to subtropical regions of eastern North America, eastern and southern Asia and Australasia.

These shrubby plants or trailing vines belong to the "typical" legumes (Faboideae), with the peas and beans, though they are part of another tribe, the Desmodieae. Therein, they are treated as type genus of the smaller subtribe Lespedezinae, which unites the present genus and its presumed closest relatives, Campylotropis and Kummerowia.

== Name of the plant ==
According to American botanist Asa Gray (1810–1888), the Lespedeza owes its name to governor of East Florida Vicente Manuel de Céspedes (1784–1790; who, through a letter, allowed botanist André Michaux to explore East Florida in search of new species of plants, where Michaux found Lespedeza), but when Céspedes wrote the letter, at the beginning of it, the name of Céspedes was changed to "Zespedez". So, when Michaux's book Flora Boreali-Americana of 1802 was printed, the name "Céspedes" to refer to the plant was written as "Lespedez", the word from which the current name of the plant was derived.

Despeleza is a synonym of Lespedeza, and this name is derived from a taxonomic anagram.

== Cultivation and uses ==
Some species are grown as garden or ornamental plants, and are used as a forage crops, notably in the southern United States, and as a means of soil enrichment and for prevention of erosion. In some areas, certain species are invasive. Lespedeza, like other legumes, have root nodules that harbor bacteria capable of nitrogen fixation from the air into a soil-bound form that can be taken up by other plants. Growers can take advantage of this process by putting the plants in their fields to release nitrogen, so they can use less fertilizer.

L. bicolor leaves and roots contain l-methoxy-N,N-dimethyltryptamine (lespedamine), as well as related N^{ω},N^{ω}-dimethyltryptamines and their oxides, as well as some bufotenin.

== Species ==
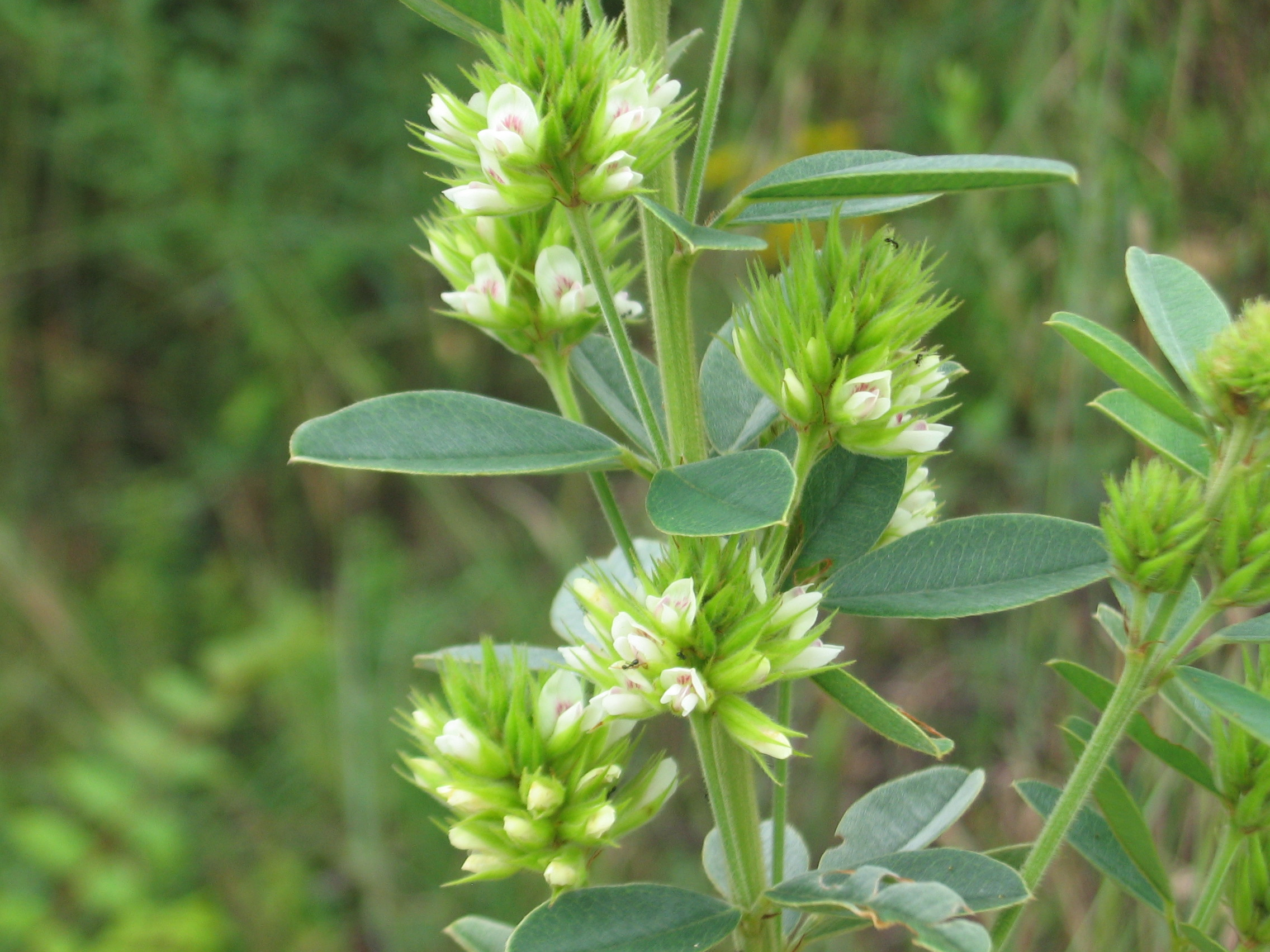
Lespedeza capitata inflorescences and leaves

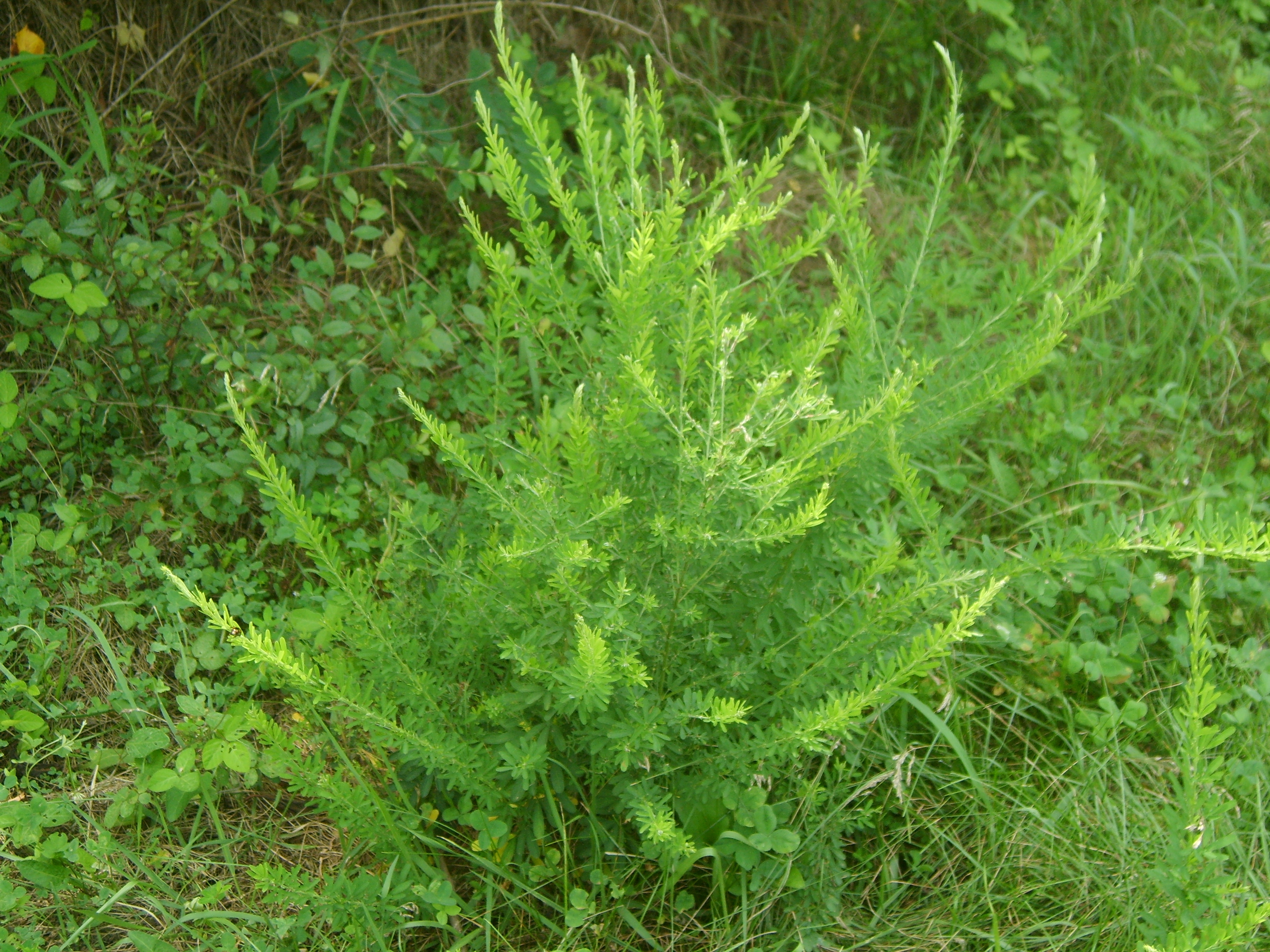
Lespedeza cuneata habitus

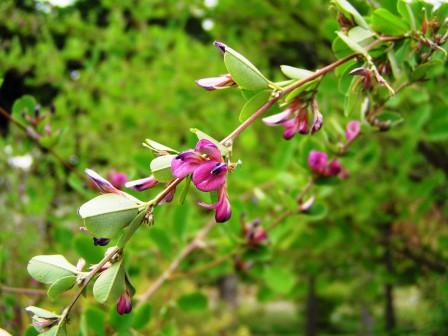
Lespedeza cyrtobotrya flowering branch

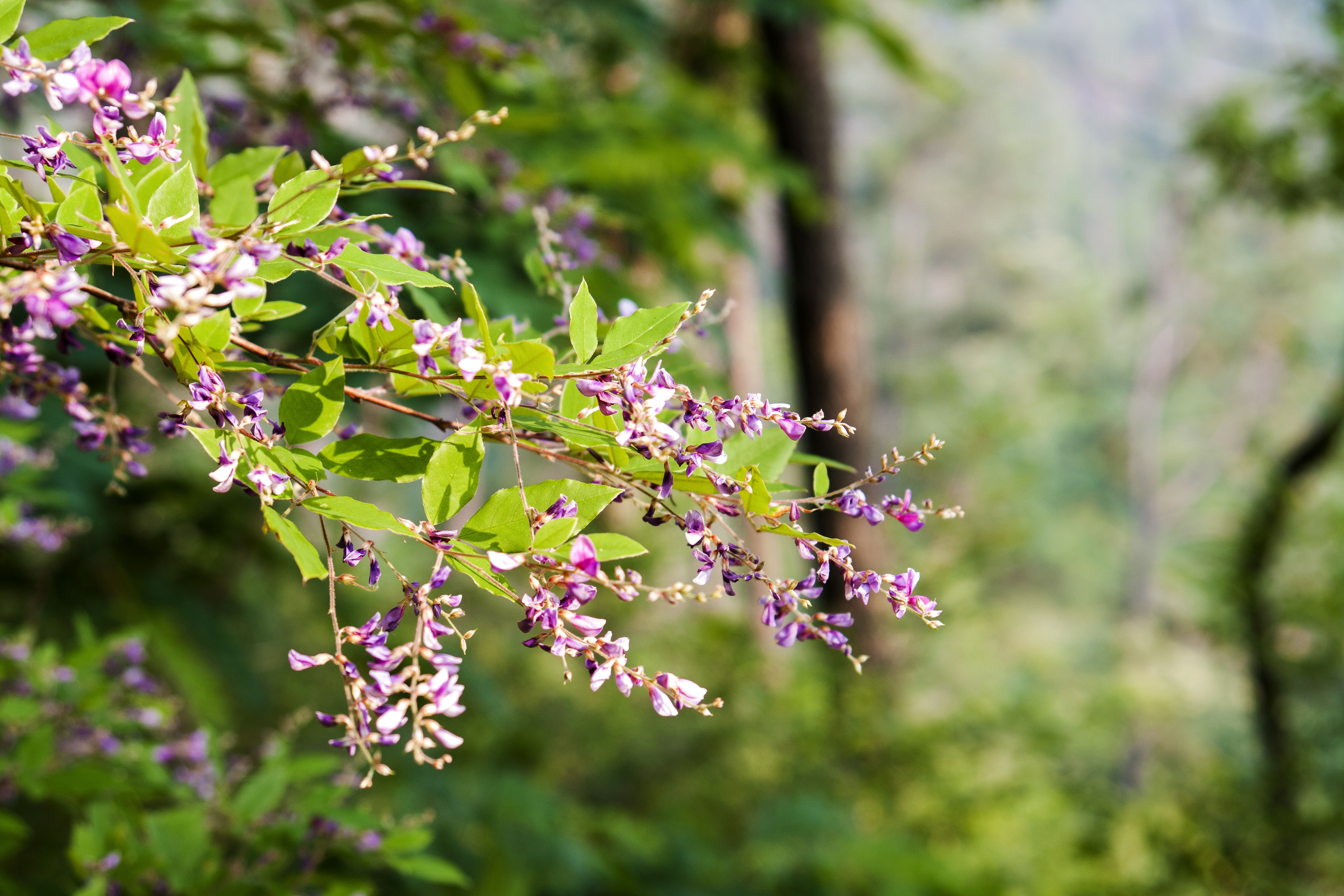
Lespedeza maximowiczii

The species and nothospecies recognized in Lespedeza include:

- Lespedeza × acuticarpa Mack. & Bush
- Lespedeza angustifolia (Pursh) Elliott
- Lespedeza × bicoloba S.Akiyama
- Lespedeza bicolor Turcz. (syn. L. bicolor var. japonica Nakai) – shrub lespedeza
- Lespedeza × brittonii E.P.Bicknell
- Lespedeza buergeri Miq.
- Lespedeza cambodianum V.D.Nguyen
- Lespedeza capitata Michx. (syn. L. frutescens Elliott, L. schindleri H.Lév., and L. stuevei DC.)
- Lespedeza caraganae Bunge
- Lespedeza chinensis G.Don (syn. L. mucronata Ricker)
- Lespedeza cuneata (Dumont-Cours.) G. Don
- Lespedeza cyrtobotrya Miq. – leafy lespedeza
- Lespedeza × cyrtobuergeri S.Akiyama & H.Ohba
- Lespedeza × cyrtoloba S.Akiyama
- Lespedeza danxiaensis Q.Fan, W.Y.Zhao & K.W.Jiang
- Lespedeza daurica (Laxm.) Schindl. (syn. L. potaninii V.N.Vassil.)
- Lespedeza davidi Franch.
- Lespedeza × divaricata (Nakai) T.B.Lee
- Lespedeza dunnii Schindl.
- Lespedeza elegans Cambess.
- Lespedeza fasciculiflora Franch.
- Lespedeza floribunda Bunge (syn. L. bicolor Prain)
- Lespedeza fordii Schindl.
- Lespedeza forrestii Schindl.
- Lespedeza frutescens (L.) Hornem.
- Lespedeza gerardiana Maxim.
- Lespedeza hengduanshanensis (C.J.Chen) Bo Xu, X.F.Gao & Li Bing Zhang
- Lespedeza hirta (L.) Hornem.
- Lespedeza hisauchii T.Nemoto & H.Ohashi
- Lespedeza hispida (Franch.) T.Nemoto & H.Ohashi
- Lespedeza homoloba Nakai
- Lespedeza inschanica (Maxim.) Schindl. – greenish juncea lespedeza
- Lespedeza intermedia (S.Watson) Britton (syn. L. frutescens (L.) Britton, L. frutescens var. acutifructa Farw.)
- Lespedeza × intermixta Makino – neonchul lespedeza
- Lespedeza japonica L.H.Bailey (unplaced)
- Lespedeza jiangxiensis Bo Xu, X.F.Gao & Li Bing Zhang
- Lespedeza juncea (L.f.) Pers. (syn. L. hedysaroides Kitag.) – juncea lespedeza
  - Lespedeza juncea var. juncea (syn. L. aitchisonii Ricker, L. cytisoides (Pall.) Nakai, L. nuristanica Rech.f., and L. pallasii G.Don)
  - Lespedeza juncea var. variegata (Cambess.) Ali (syn. L. kanaoriensis Cambess. and L. variegata Cambess.)
- Lespedeza × kagoshimensis Hatus.
- Lespedeza leptostachya Engelm. ex A.Gray
- Lespedeza lichiyuniae T.Nemoto, H.Ohashi & T.Itoh
- Lespedeza × longifolia DC.
- Lespedeza × macrovirgata Kitag.
- Lespedeza × manniana Mack. & Bush
- Lespedeza maritima Nakai
- Lespedeza maximowiczii R.C.Schneid. – Korean lespedeza
- Lespedeza melanantha Nakai – black-flower lespedeza
- Lespedeza × miquelii S.Akiyama
- Lespedeza mucronata Ricker
- Lespedeza × neglecta (Britton) Mack. & Bush
- Lespedeza × nuttallii Darl.
- Lespedeza × oblongifolia (Britton) W.Stone
- Lespedeza pilosa (Thunb.) Siebold & Zucc. – pilose lespedeza
- Lespedeza procumbens Michx.
- Lespedeza pseudomaximowiczii D.P.Jin, Bo Xu & B.H.Choi
- Lespedeza repens (L.) W.P.C.Barton
- Lespedeza × robusta Nakai
- Lespedeza sessilifolia Gamble
- Lespedeza × simulata Mack. & Bush
- Lespedeza stuevei Nutt.
- Lespedeza texana Britton
- Lespedeza thunbergii (DC.) Nakai
  - Lespedeza thunbergii subsp. elliptica (Benth. ex Maxim.) H.Ohashi (syn. L. elliptica Benth. ex Maxim.)
  - Lespedeza thunbergii subsp. formosa (Vogel) H.Ohashi (syn. L. albiflora Ricker, L. hayatae Hatus., L. inabensis Nakai, L. intermedia (Maxim. ex Matsum.) Nakai, L. pubescens Hayata, L. shiroyamensis Hatus., and L. wilfordii Ricker)
  - Lespedeza thunbergii subsp. patens (Nakai) H.Ohashi (syn. L. patens Nakai)
  - Lespedeza thunbergii subsp. satsumensis (Nakai) H.Ohashi (syn. L. satsumensis Nakai)
  - Lespedeza thunbergii subsp. thunbergii (syn. L. chekiangensis Ricker, L. grandiflora H.Koidz., L. grandis Koidz., L. kiusiana Nakai, L. liukiuensis Hatus., L. nipponica Nakai, L. racemosa Dippel, L. sieboldii Miq., L. tetraloba Nakai, L. viatorum Champ. ex Benth.)
- Lespedeza tomentosa (Thunb.) Siebold ex Maxim. (syn. L. hirta Miq.) – woolly lespedeza
- Lespedeza violacea (L.) Pers.
- Lespedeza virgata (Thunb.) DC. (syn. L. patentibicolor T.B.Lee) – Wando lespedeza
- Lespedeza virginica (L.) Britton (syn. L. angustifolia Darl.)

Some species formerly in this genus that are now placed elsewhere, typically in the Lespedezinae, for example, in genus Campylotropis. These include:

- Lespedeza junghuhniana Bakh.f. = Campylotropis cytisoides (Jungh.) Miq.
- Lespedeza sericea (Graham) Benth. = Campylotropis macrostyla (D.Don) Lindl. ex Miq.
- Lespedeza speciosa Royle ex Schindl. = Campylotropis speciosa (Royle ex Schindl.) Schindl.
- Lespedeza striata (Thunb.) Hook. & Arn. = Kummerowia striata (Thunb.) Schindl.
- Lespedeza tomentosa Maxim. = Campylotropis pinetorum (Kurz) Schindl.
