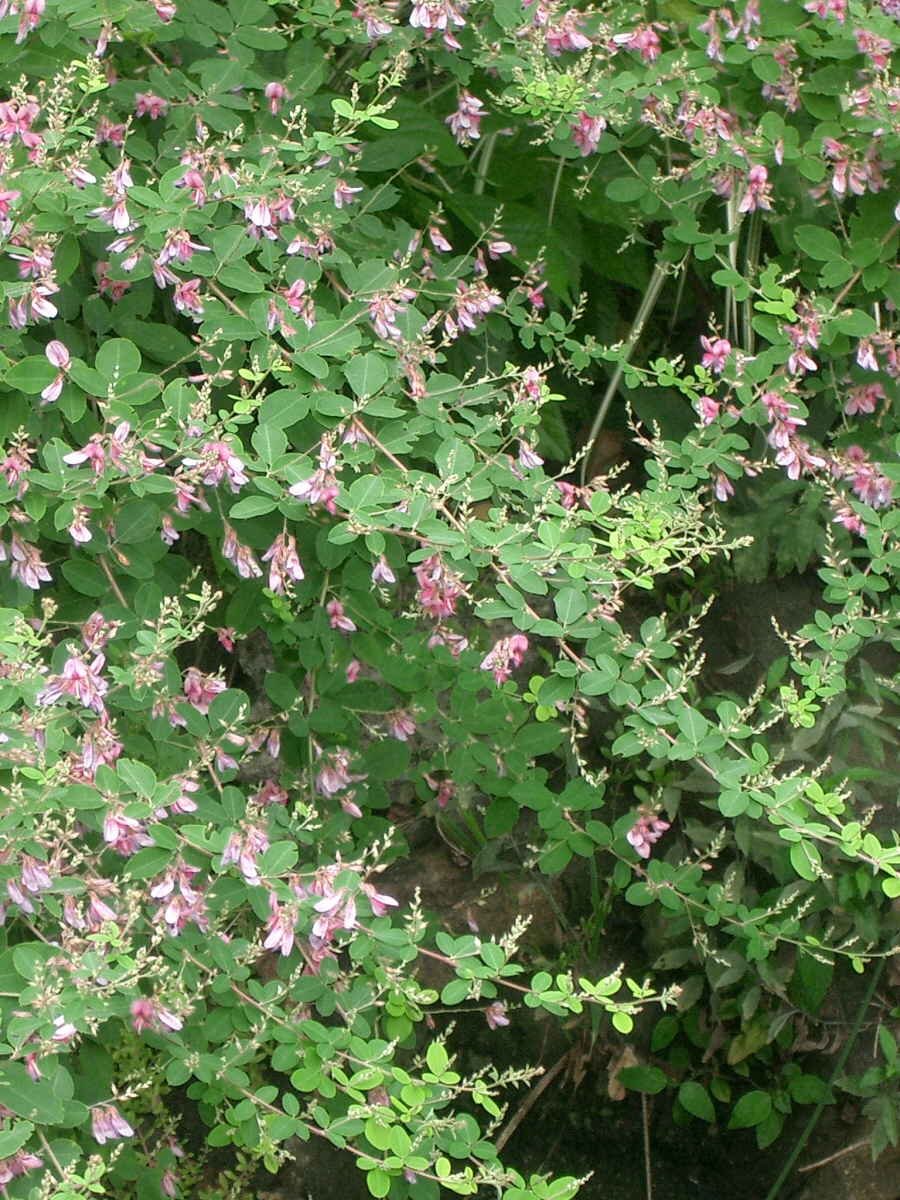

Scientific classification
- Kingdom: Plantae
- Clade: Tracheophytes
- Clade: Angiosperms
- Clade: Eudicots
- Clade: Rosids
- Order: Fabales
- Family: Fabaceae
- Subfamily: Faboideae
- Genus: Lespedeza
- Species: L. bicolor

Binomial name
- Lespedeza bicolor Turcz. (1840)

Synonyms
- Synonymy: Desmodium penduliflorum Oudem. (1866); Lespedeza bicolor f. acutifolia Matsum. (1902); Lespedeza bicolor f. alba (Bean) Ohwi (1953); Lespedeza bicolor var. alba Bean (1914); Lespedeza bicolor f. albiflora Tatew. (1939), nom. illeg.; Lespedeza bicolor f. grandifolia Matsum. (1902); Lespedeza bicolor var. japonica Nakai (1923); Lespedeza bicolor f. nakaiana Murata (1983); Lespedeza bicolor var. nana Nakai (1930); Lespedeza bicolor f. niveoflora S.Akiyama & H.Ohba (1988); Lespedeza bicolor f. parvifolia Matsum. (1902); Lespedeza bicolor f. patens Nakai ex Hatus. (1967); Lespedeza bicolor f. pendula S.L.Tung & Z.Lu (1988); Lespedeza bicolor f. rosea (Nakai) S.Akiyama & H.Ohba (1984); Lespedeza bicolor var. sericea Nakai (1927), nom. illeg.; Lespedeza bicolor f. tomentella Hatus. (1967); Lespedeza homoloba f. rosea Nakai (1939); Lespedeza ionocalyx Nakai (1939); Lespedeza melanantha var. longifolia Uyeki (1934); Lespedeza melanantha f. rosea Nakai (1939); Lespedeza penduliflora (Oudem.) Nakai (1923); Lespedeza penduliflora var. cathayana P.S.Hsu (1966); Lespedeza penduliflora subsp. cathayana P.S.Hsu (1966); Lespedeza setiloba Nakai (1927); Lespedeza spicata Nakai & F.Maek. (1934); Lespedeza tobae H.Koidz. (1937); Lespedeza veitchii Ricker (1942)

= Lespedeza bicolor =

Species of legume

Lespedeza bicolor is a species of flowering plant in the legume family known by the common names shrubby bushclover, shrub lespedeza, and bicolor lespedeza. It is native to eastern Asia, ranging from southeastern Siberia to eastern China, Mongolia, Korea, and Japan. and it is widely grown as an ornamental plant. In some regions, such as the southeastern United States, it grows in the wild as an introduced and invasive species.

== Description ==
This plant is quite variable in appearance, and it has been bred into a number of cultivars. In general, this plant is an erect shrub growing to 3 metres (9.8 feet) in height and width, generally remaining smaller in cold climates. It can grow from ground level to 5 feet (1.5 metres) in one growing season. The cultivars "Little Buddy" and "Yakushima" grow to 3 feet (0.91 metres) and 1.5 feet (0.46 metres), resp. Lespedeza bicolor grows from a thick root system. The stems may be 3 centimetres (1.2 inches) in diameter. The leaves are each made up of three oval leaflets up to 5 centimetres (2.0 inches) long. The inflorescence is a raceme of up to 15 open pealike flowers, which are pink and purple in color. There are also cleistogamous flowers which self-pollinate and do not open. The fruit is a flat legume pod nearly a centimeter long which contains one seed.

== Cultivation ==
This species was first introduced to the United States as an ornamental shrub in 1856, and it was likely introduced several times after that. In the 1930s it was recommended for use as erosion control and in the revegetation of abandoned mine sites. It was used to enhance wildlife habitat, particularly for the northern bobwhite. The United States Department of Agriculture produced and distributed the seed and many millions were planted. A number of strains and cultivars were developed to improve the plant's drought tolerance and seed production.

== Habitat ==
It can grow in many types of habitat, including disturbed areas. By the 1990s the plant had escaped cultivation and taken hold in many regions of the eastern United States, especially those in the Southeast. In the US, it is now present from New York to northern Florida and as far west as Nebraska and Texas. It can be found as far north as Ontario in Canada.

In some areas this plant can form dense stands, becoming an aggressive invader. It has been considered threatening in areas where it has disturbed or prevented the growth of native plants, including grasses and trees. It may spread after fire, interfering in schedules of controlled burns of fire-adapted habitat types.

== Phytochemicals ==
Lespedeza bicolor var. japonica contains lespedamine which is structurally related to DMT and dihydrolespedezol derivatives, as well as the dimeric flavonoid, lespebicolin B
