= Dog violet =

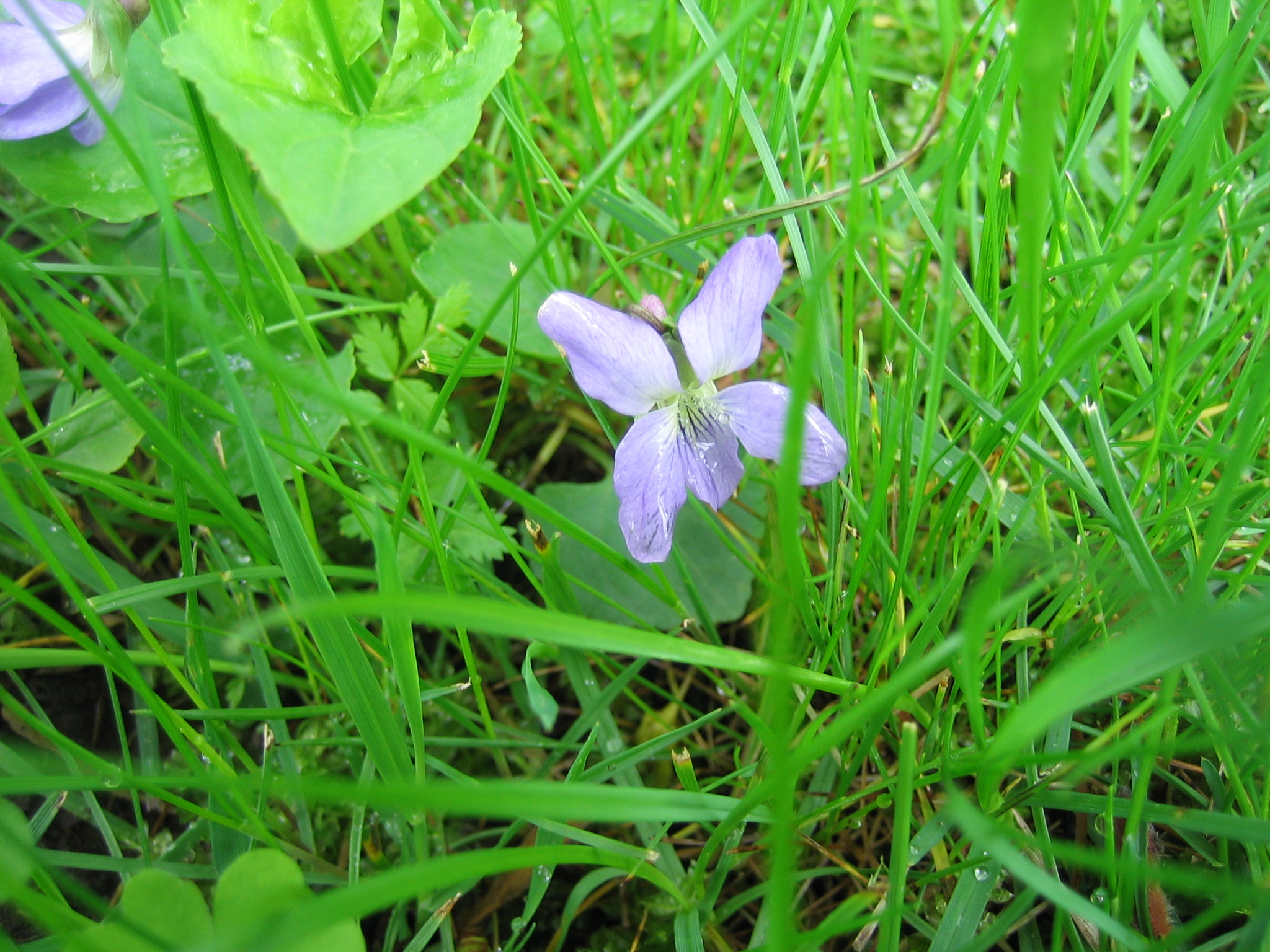
Viola labradorica, a common weed.

Dog violet is the common name for various species of the plant genus Viola with unscented flowers. The term arose to differentiate them from the scented sweet violet. Species so named include:

- Viola canina – heath dog violet
- Viola labradorica (syn. V. conspersa) – American dog or alpine violet
- Viola reichenbachiana – early dog violet
- Viola riviniana – common dog violet

The roots and seeds of this plant are toxic and should not be eaten. A number of species in the genus Erythronium in the family Liliaceae are sometimes referred to as "dog's-tooth violet".
