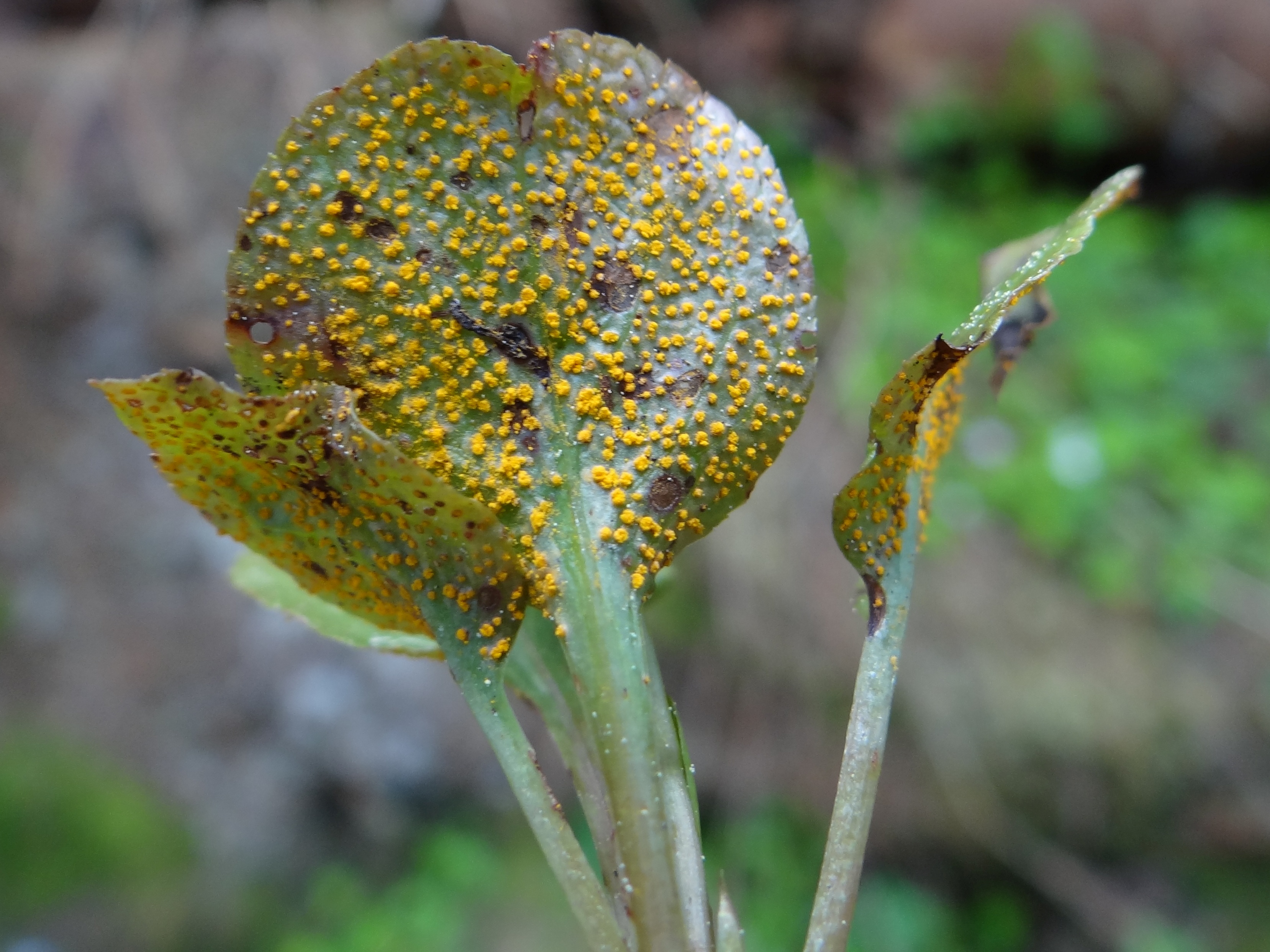
- P. violae on a leaf of a Viola species in the Tatra Mountains.

Scientific classification
- Kingdom: Fungi
- Division: Basidiomycota
- Class: Pucciniomycetes
- Order: Pucciniales
- Family: Pucciniaceae
- Genus: Puccinia
- Species: P. violae

Binomial name
- Puccinia violae (Schumach.) DC. (1815)

Synonyms
- Aecidium depauperans Vize; Aecidium violatum DC.; Aecidium violae Schumach.; Caeoma violatum Link; Dicaeoma depauperans (Vize) Kuntze; Dicaeoma violae (Schumach.) Kuntze; Puccinia aegra Grove; Puccinia depauperans (Vize) P. Syd. & Syd.; Puccinia violarum Link; Trichobasis violarum Lév.; Uredo violae Schumach.

= Puccinia violae =

Species of fungus

Puccinia violae is a plant pathogen that causes rust on Viola species. Reported host species of Puccinia violae include Viola ambigua, Viola canina, Viola cornuta, Viola odorata, Viola riviniana, Viola tricolor and possibly from Viola hirta.

It is common in Iceland.

== See also ==
- List of Puccinia species
