= Horned pansy =

Horned pansy is a name used for some plants in the genus Viola:

- Viola cornuta
- Viola × williamsii
