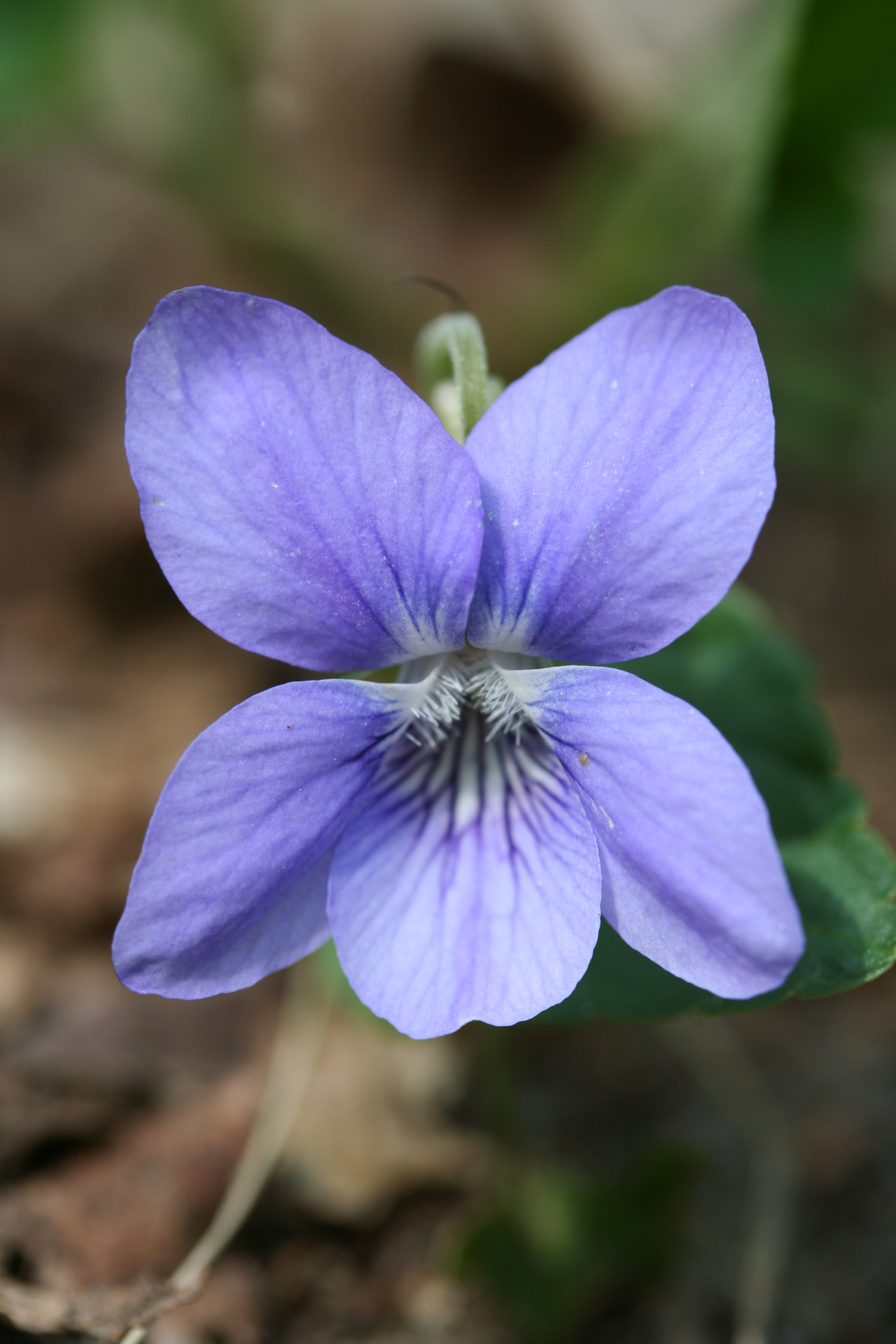

Scientific classification
- Kingdom: Plantae
- Clade: Tracheophytes
- Clade: Angiosperms
- Clade: Eudicots
- Clade: Rosids
- Order: Malpighiales
- Family: Violaceae
- Genus: Viola
- Species: V. riviniana

Binomial name
- Viola riviniana Rchb.

= Viola riviniana =

Species of flowering plant

Viola riviniana, the common dog-violet, is a species of flowering plant in the family Violaceae, native to Eurasia and Africa. It is also called wood violet and dog violet. It inhabits woodland edges, grassland and shady hedge banks. It is found in all soils except those which are acid or very wet.

Growing to 10 cm (3.9 in) tall and 50 cm (20 in) broad, this prostrate perennial has dark green, heart-shaped leaves and produces multiple violet coloured flowers in May and June.

Viola riviniana was voted the county flower of Lincolnshire in 2002, following a poll by the wild plant conservation charity Plantlife.

== Distribution ==
Common in Ireland and all the British Isles.

== Wildlife value ==
It is the food plant of the pearl bordered fritillary, small pearl-bordered fritillary, silver-washed fritillary and high brown fritillary butterflies.

It is a known host of the pathogenic fungus Puccinia violae.

== Similar species ==
- Viola odorata (sweet violet) – fragrant; all the leaves are located at the base of the plant; stipules are gland-tipped
- Viola canina (heath dog violet) – clear blue flowers; narrower leaves; smaller teeth on the stipules
- Viola palustris (marsh violet) – found in wet places; leaves are kidney-shaped; grows from underground creeping stems; dark-veined flowers; stipules without teeth
- Viola labradorica (alpine violet) – V. riviniana is sometimes sold by nurseries as V. labradorica

== Hybrids ==
This species hybridises with early dog-violet (V. reichenbachiana) to produce Viola × bavarica.
