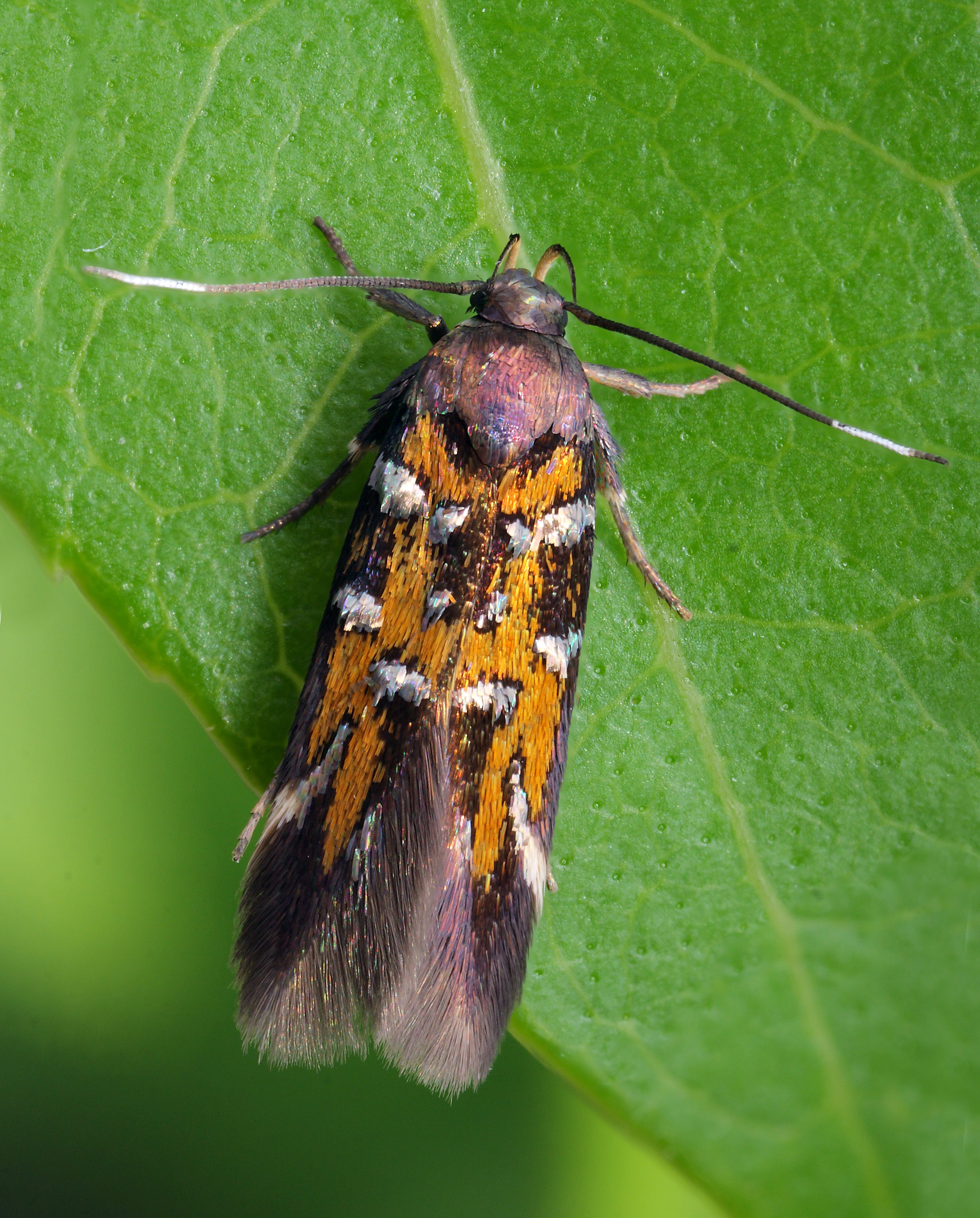

Scientific classification
- Kingdom: Animalia
- Phylum: Arthropoda
- Class: Insecta
- Order: Lepidoptera
- Family: Cosmopterigidae
- Genus: Pancalia
- Species: P. leuwenhoekella

Binomial name
- Pancalia leuwenhoekella (Linnaeus, 1761)

Synonyms
- Phalaena leuwenhoekella Linnaeus, 1761; Phalaena leuvenhoekella Linnaeus, 1767; Tinea leuwenhockella Denis & Schiffermuller, 1775; Oecophora schmidtella Treitschke, 1833; Pancalia leeuwenhoeckella

= Pancalia leuwenhoekella =

Species of moth

Pancalia leuwenhoekella is a moth in the family Cosmopterigidae.

== Subspecies ==
Subspecies include:

- Pancalia leuwenhoekella leuwenhoekella
- Pancalia leuwenhoekella japonica Riedl, 1973 (Japan: Honshu)
- Pancalia leuwenhoekella mandshuricella Sinev, 1985 (Russian Far East)

== Distribution and habitat ==
This species is present in nearly all of Europe. In the east, the range extends to Asia Minor, the Caucasus, south-western Siberia and the Russian Far East. Pancalia leuwenhoekella prefers chalk and limestone habitats.

== Description ==
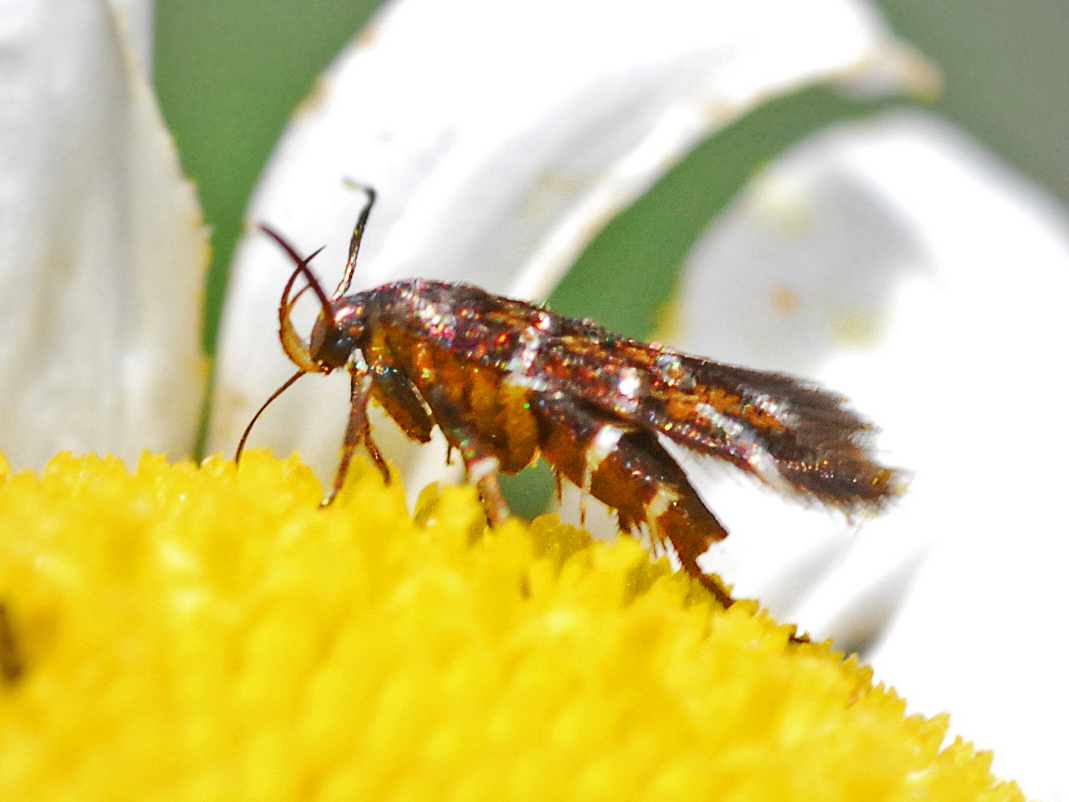
Side view

Pancalia leuwenhoekella has a wingspan of 10–12 mm. The head and thorax are dark bronzy-metallic. Antennae usually with white subapical band. Forewings are deep orange, margins more or less blackish; a narrow interrupted fascia at 1/4, a costal spot before middle and another inwardly oblique at 3/4, a dorsal median spot and an erect tornal mark pale golden-metallic, blackish-edged; a whitish spot in cilia on posterior costal spot. Hindwings are rather dark bronzy-fuscous. This species is very similar to Pancalia schwarzella .

== Biology ==
The larva is dull purple - reddish, segmental incisions and wrinkles pale brownish-ochreous; head pale yellowish-brown, darker-marked; plate of 2 transparent. Adults are on wing from April to June.

The larvae feed on Viola species, including Viola tricolor, Viola hirta and Viola canina.

== Bibliography ==
- Bradley, J.D.Checklist of Lepidoptera Recorded from The British Isles, Second Edition (Revised) (2000)
- C. Koster, S. Yu. Sinev: Momphidae, Batrachedridae, Stathmopodidae, Agonoxenidae, Cosmopterigidae, Chrysopeleiidae. In: P. Huemer, O. Karsholt, L. Lyneborg (Hrsg.): Microlepidoptera of Europe. 1. Auflage. Band 5. Apollo Books, Stenstrup 2003, ISBN 87-88757-66-8, S. 93
- Emmet, A.M., Langmaid, J.R. (Eds.)The Moths and Butterflies of Great Britain and Ireland, Volume 4 (Part 1) (2002)
