= Pancalia baldizzonella =

Scientific classification
- Kingdom: Animalia
- Phylum: Arthropoda
- Clade: Pancrustacea
- Class: Insecta
- Order: Lepidoptera
- Family: Cosmopterigidae
- Genus: Pancalia
- Species: P. baldizzonella

Binomial name
- Pancalia baldizzonella Riedl, 1994

Species of moth

Pancalia baldizzonella is a moth in the family Cosmopterigidae. It is found in Italy.

The wingspan is about 15 mm. Adults have been recorded in July.

== Taxonomy ==
Pancalia baldizzonella might be just a form of Pancalia schwarzella.
