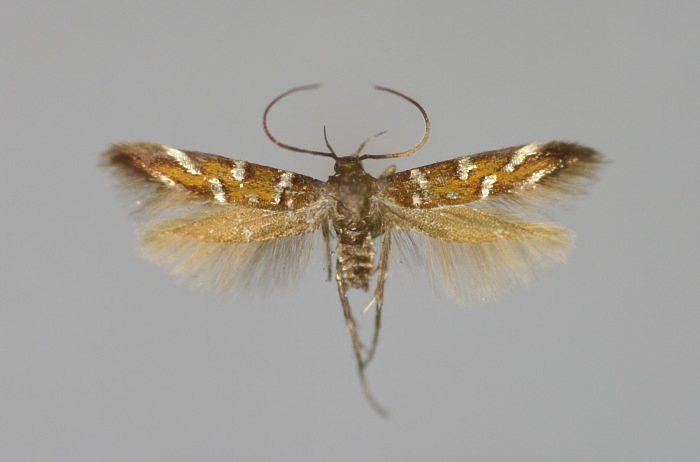

Scientific classification
- Domain: Eukaryota
- Kingdom: Animalia
- Phylum: Arthropoda
- Class: Insecta
- Order: Lepidoptera
- Family: Cosmopterigidae
- Genus: Pancalia
- Species: P. schwarzella

Binomial name
- Pancalia schwarzella (Fabricius, 1798)

Synonyms
- Tinea schwarzella Fabricius, 1798; Pancalia latreillella Curtis, 1830

= Pancalia schwarzella =

Species of moth

Pancalia schwarzella is a moth in the family Cosmopterigidae. It is found in almost all of Europe, except the south-east. In southern Europe, it is mainly found in mountainous areas up to altitudes of about 2,600 meters. In the east, the range extends to the mountains of Central Asia, Siberia and from Zabaykalsky Krai to the Kamchatka Peninsula.

The wingspan is 11–16 mm.The forewings are bronze-brown with five white spots. The hindwings are spotless. Very similar to Pancalia leuwenhoekella The differences are - tornal silver spot oblique, no white section towards the apex of the antennae.

Adults are on wing from late April to early July. Adults visit the flowers of various plants, including Taraxacum, Hieracium, Bellis perennis and Lotus corniculatus.

The larvae feed on Viola canina and Viola hirta.
