= Bangrove Wood, Ixworth =

Protected area in Suffolk, England

Coordinates: 52.313°N 0.83°E

- Site of Special Scientific Interest
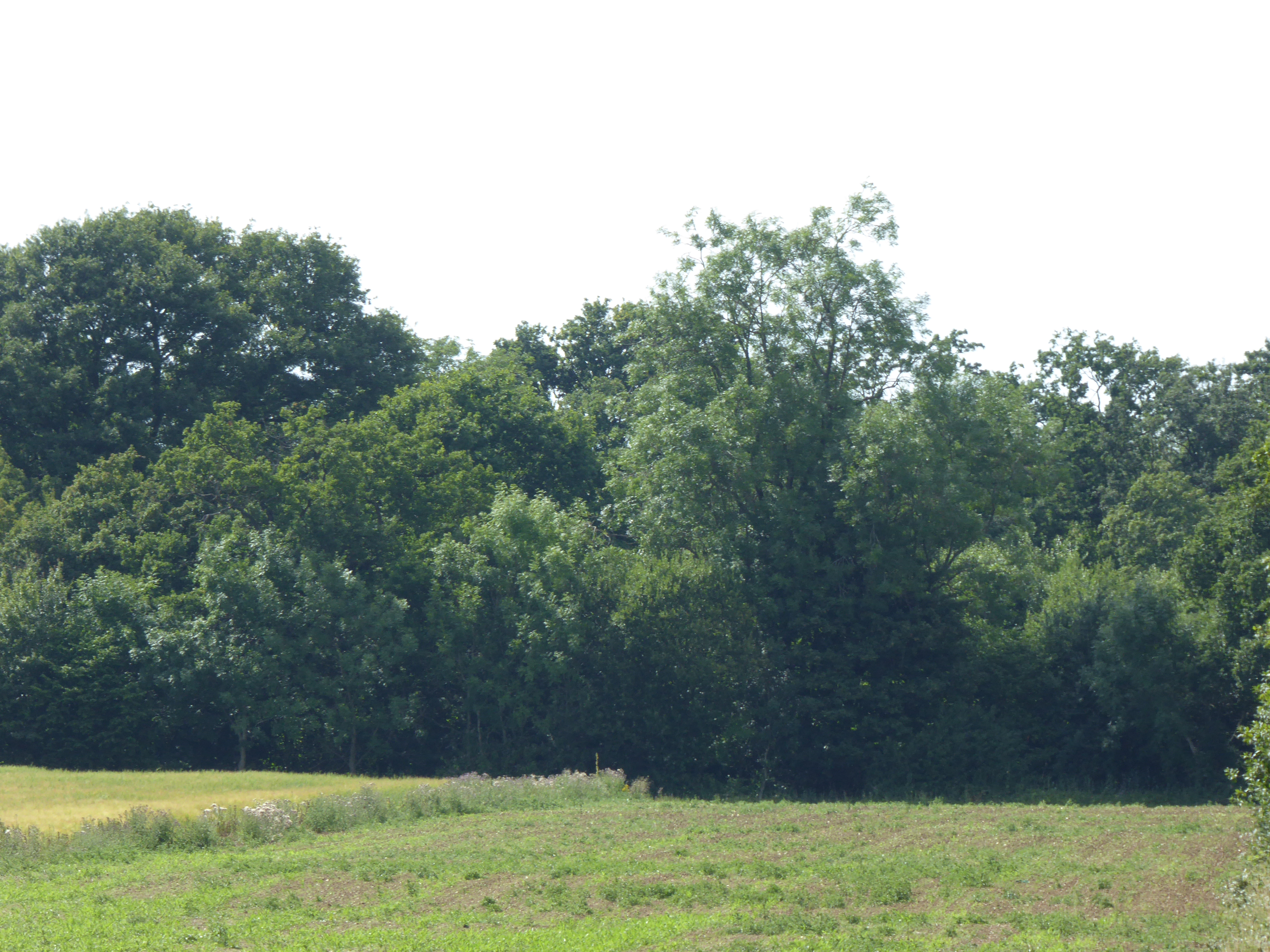
- Location of Bangrove Wood, Ixworth.
- Area of search: Suffolk
- Grid reference: TL 930 721
- Interest: Biological
- Area: 18.6 hectares
- Notification date: 1983
- Location map: Magic Map

Bangrove Wood is an 18.6-hectare (46-acre) biological Site of Special Scientific Interest north of Ixworth in Suffolk, England.

This is ancient coppice with standards on clay soil with diverse herb flora. The most common trees are ash, field maple and hazel, with many oak standards. Flora include early purple orchid, wood anemone and pale wood violet.

The site is private land with no public access.
