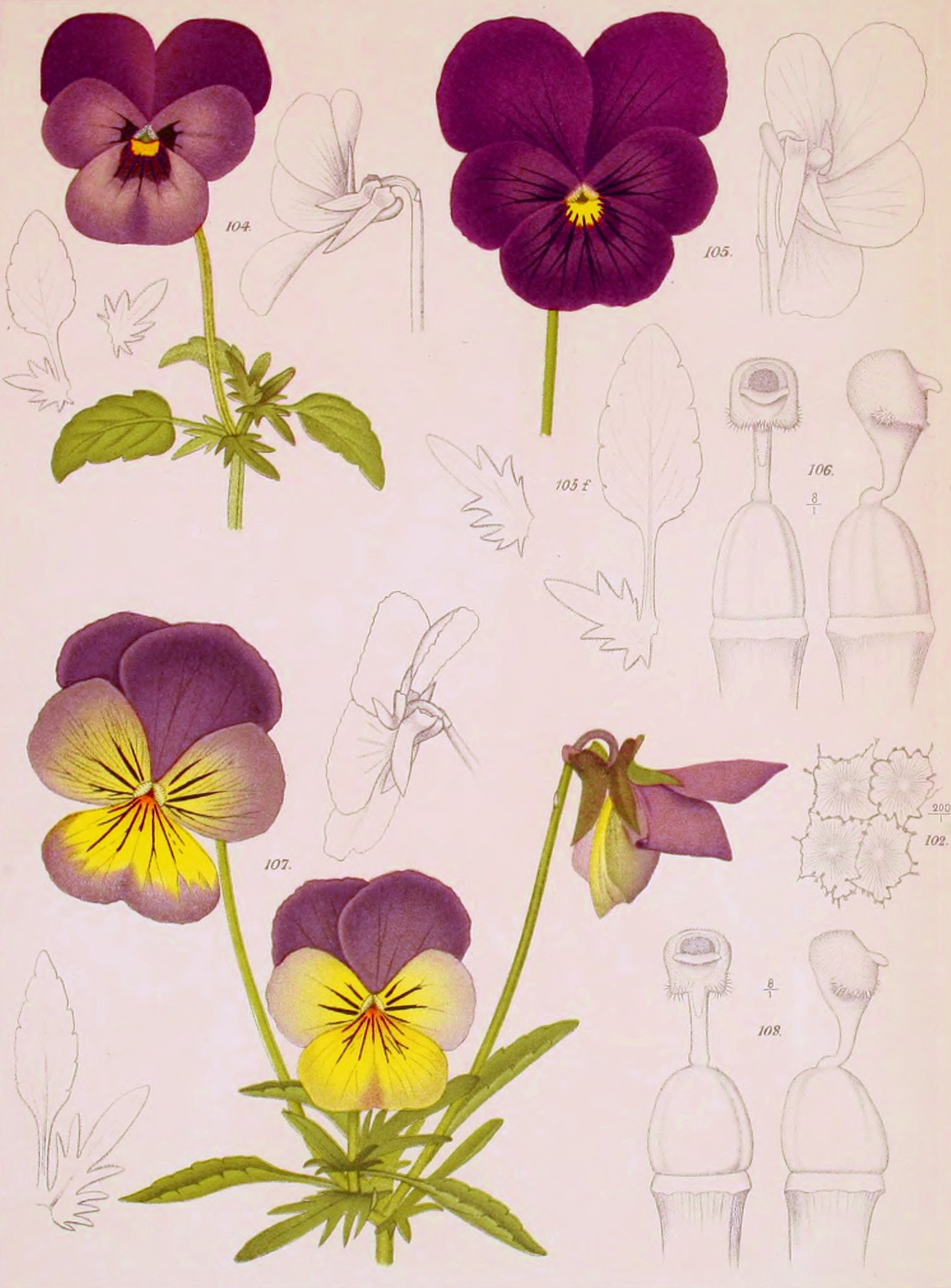

Scientific classification
- Kingdom: Plantae
- Clade: Tracheophytes
- Clade: Angiosperms
- Clade: Eudicots
- Clade: Rosids
- Order: Malpighiales
- Family: Violaceae
- Genus: Viola
- Species: V. × williamsii

Binomial name
- Viola × williamsii Wittr.

Synonyms
- Viola × suecana Wittr.

= Viola × williamsii =

Hybrid species of flowering plant

Viola × williamsii, known as hybrid horned pansy, tufted pansy, or just horned pansy, is a hybrid between Viola cornuta and V. × wittrockiana (which itself is a hybrid of V. tricolor, V. lutea and V. altaica). The epithet is named for Benjamin Samuel Williams.

It differs from V. cornuta in having wider, slightly overlapping petals, the lateral ones directed outwards or upwards, and more deeply dentate to laciniate stipules with the apical lobe clearly narrowed towards the base. It differs from V. × wittrockiana in at least one of the following characters: perennial habit, scented flowers and a longer spur.

== Gallery ==
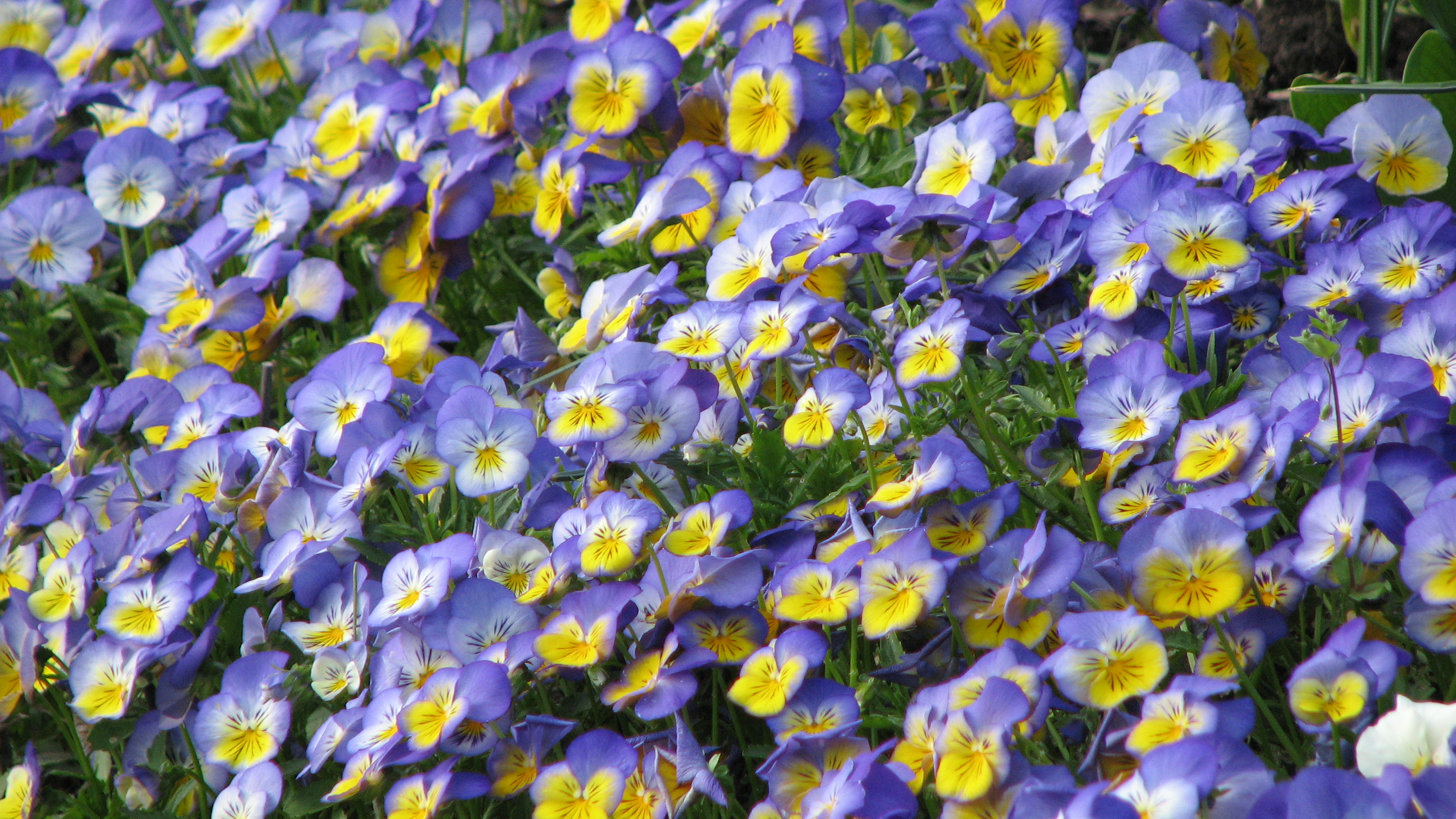

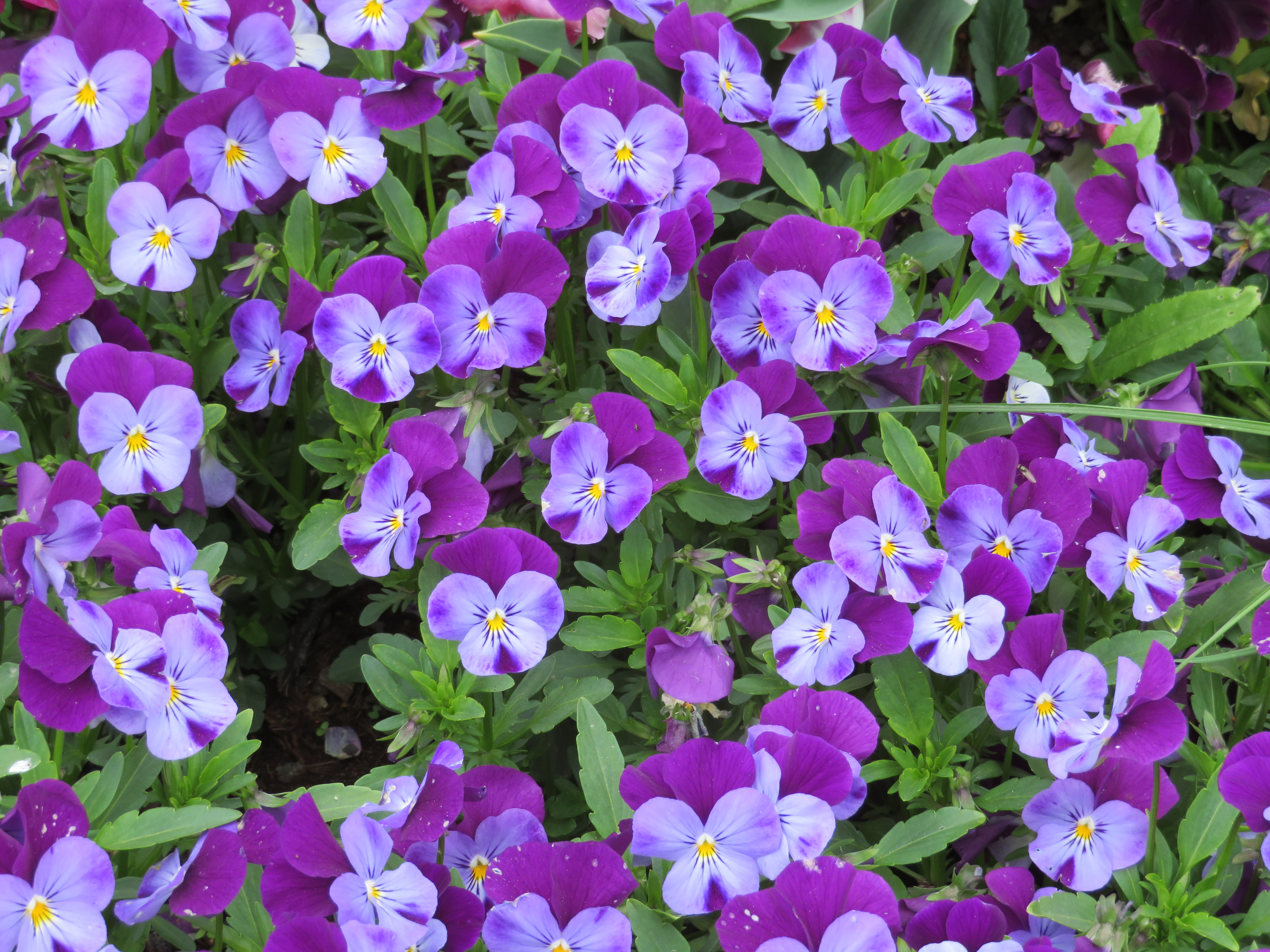

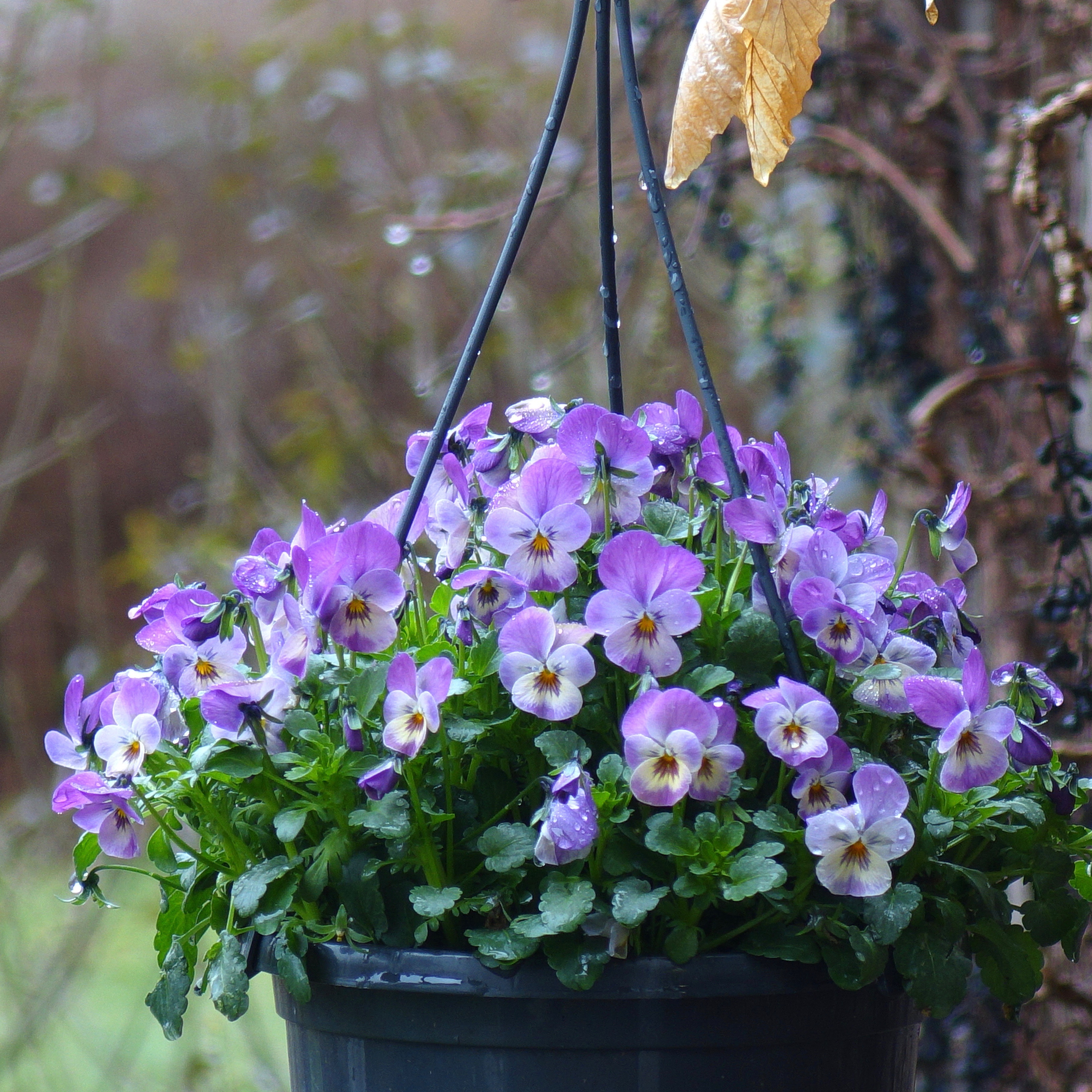

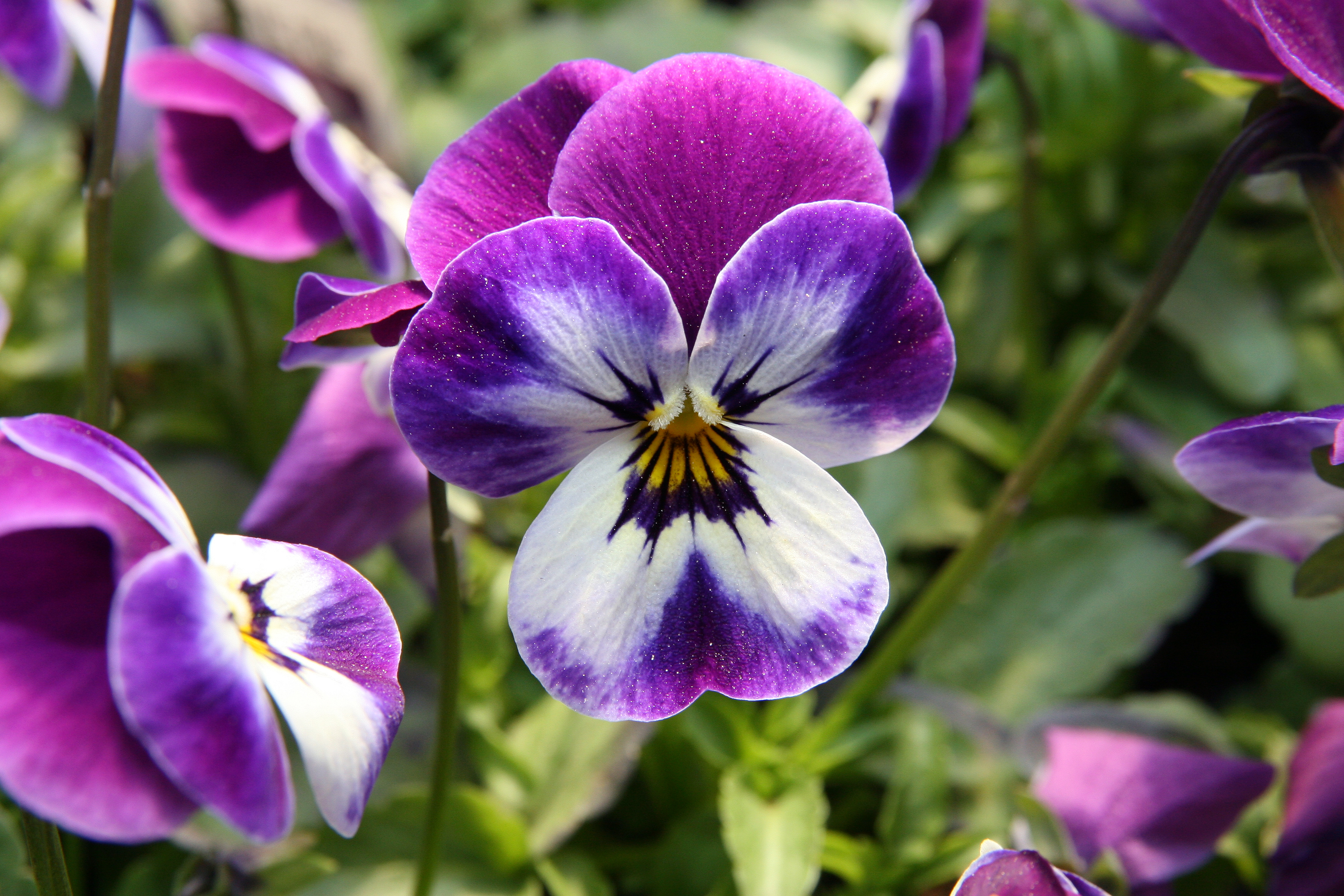

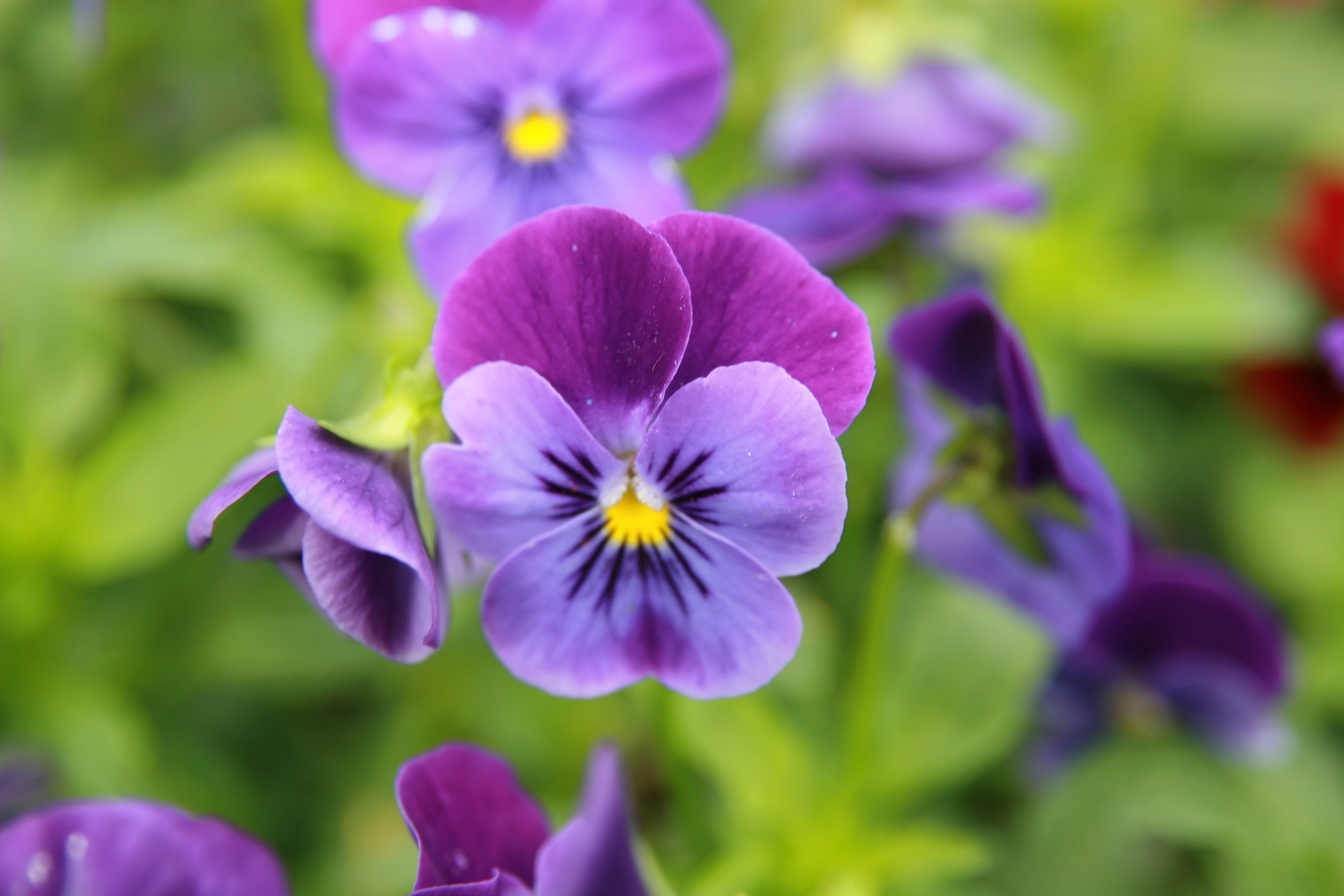

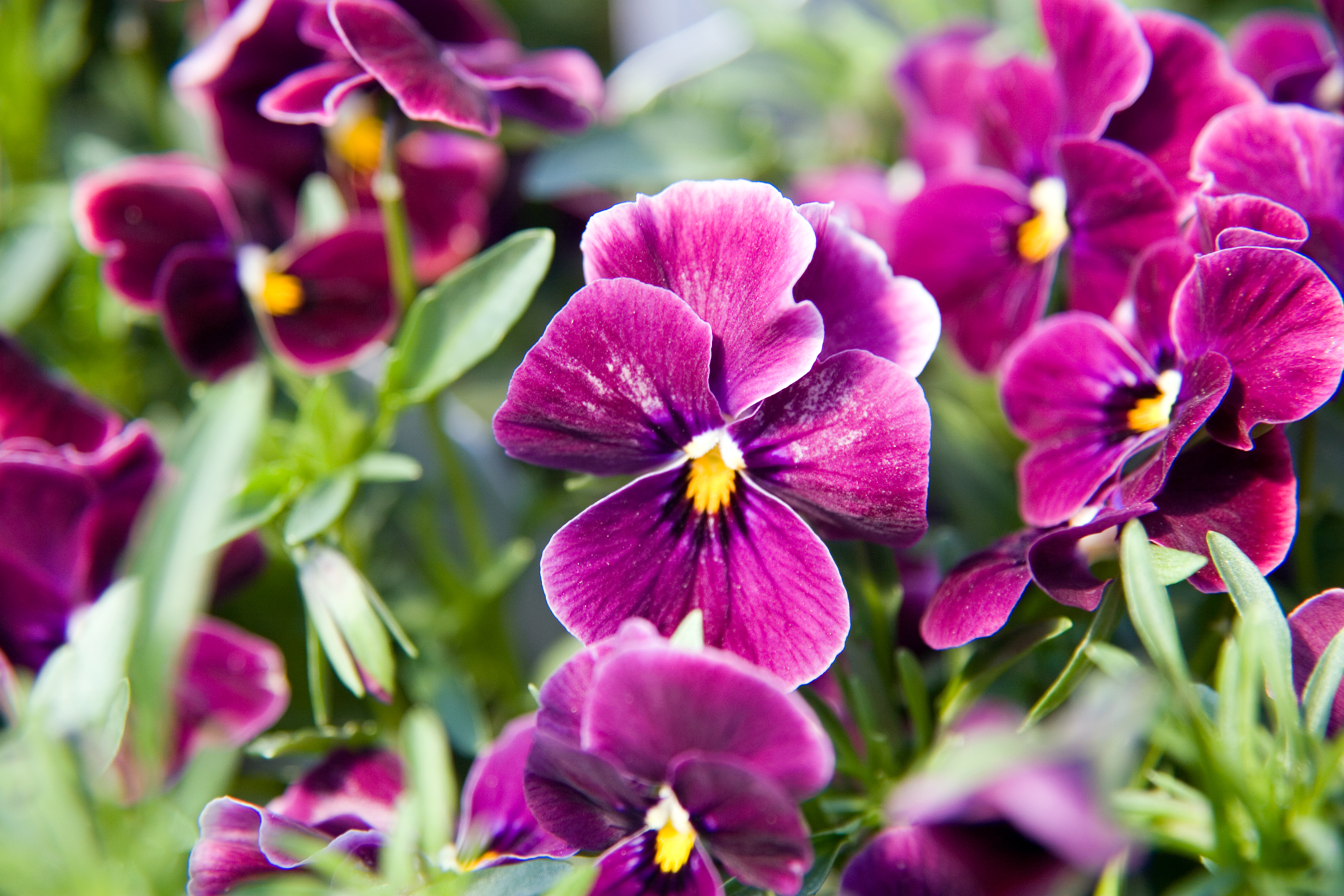

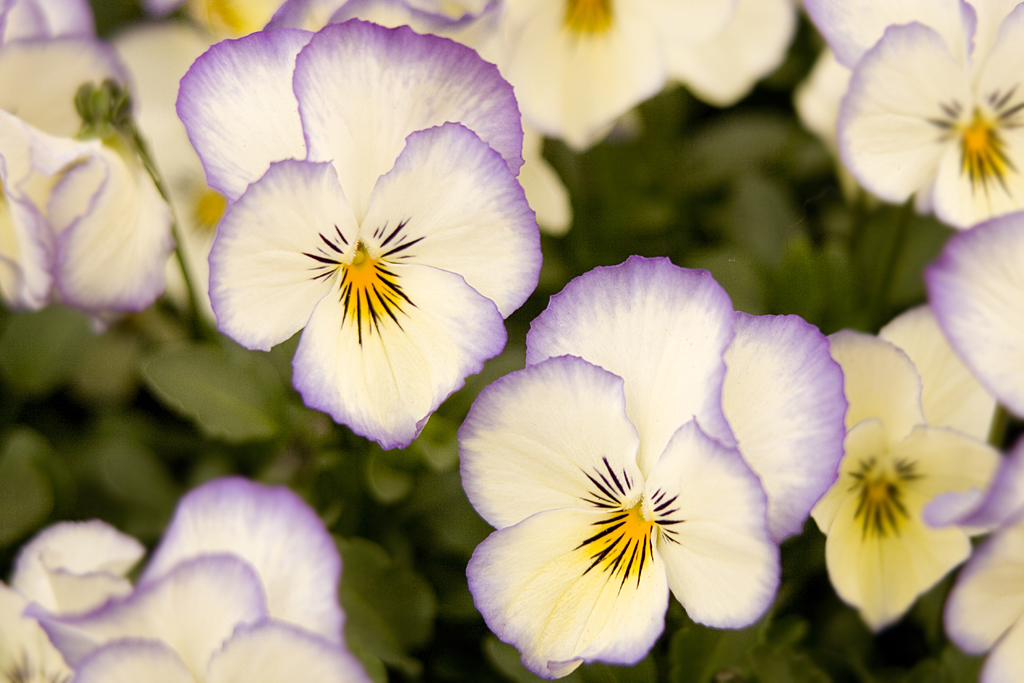

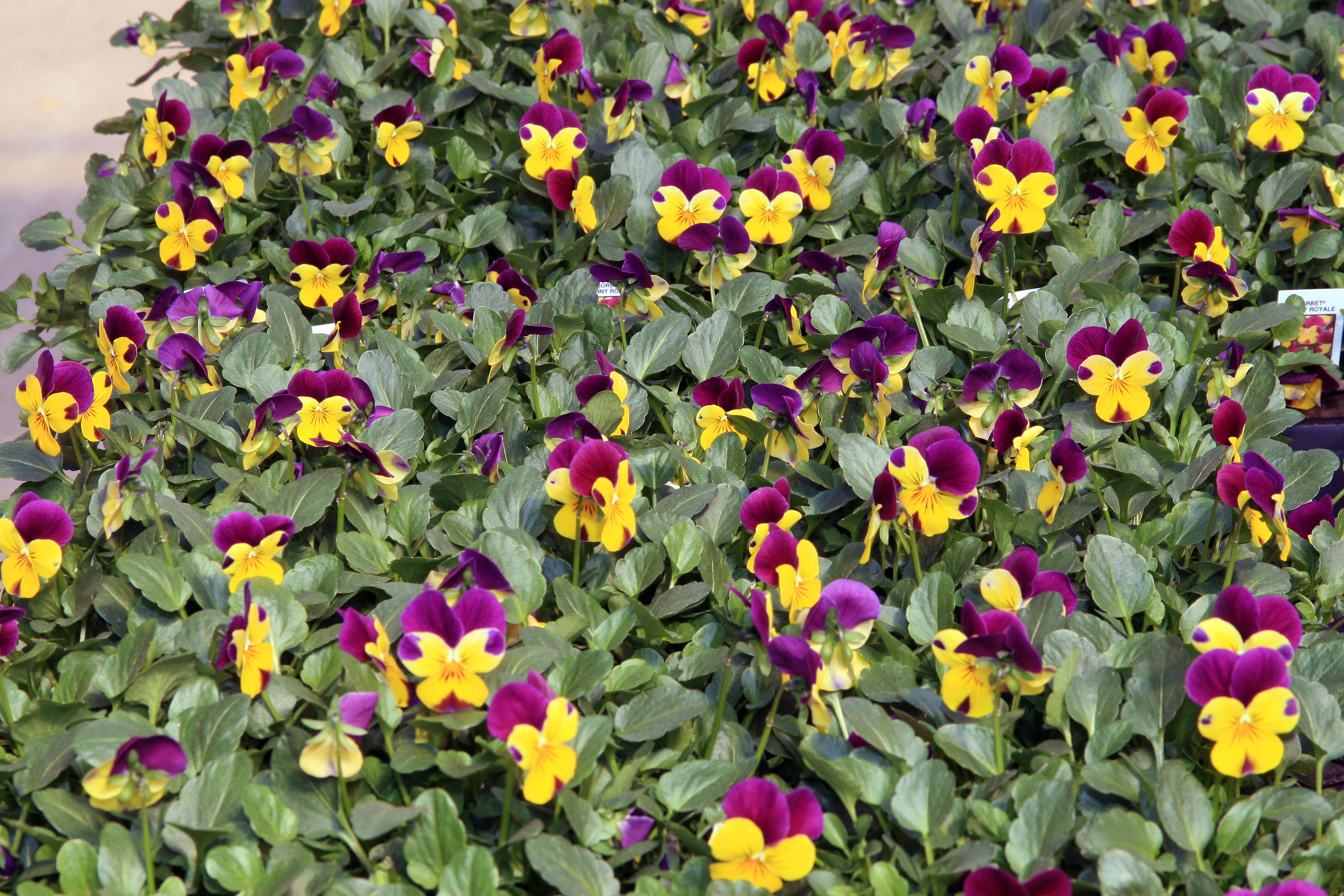

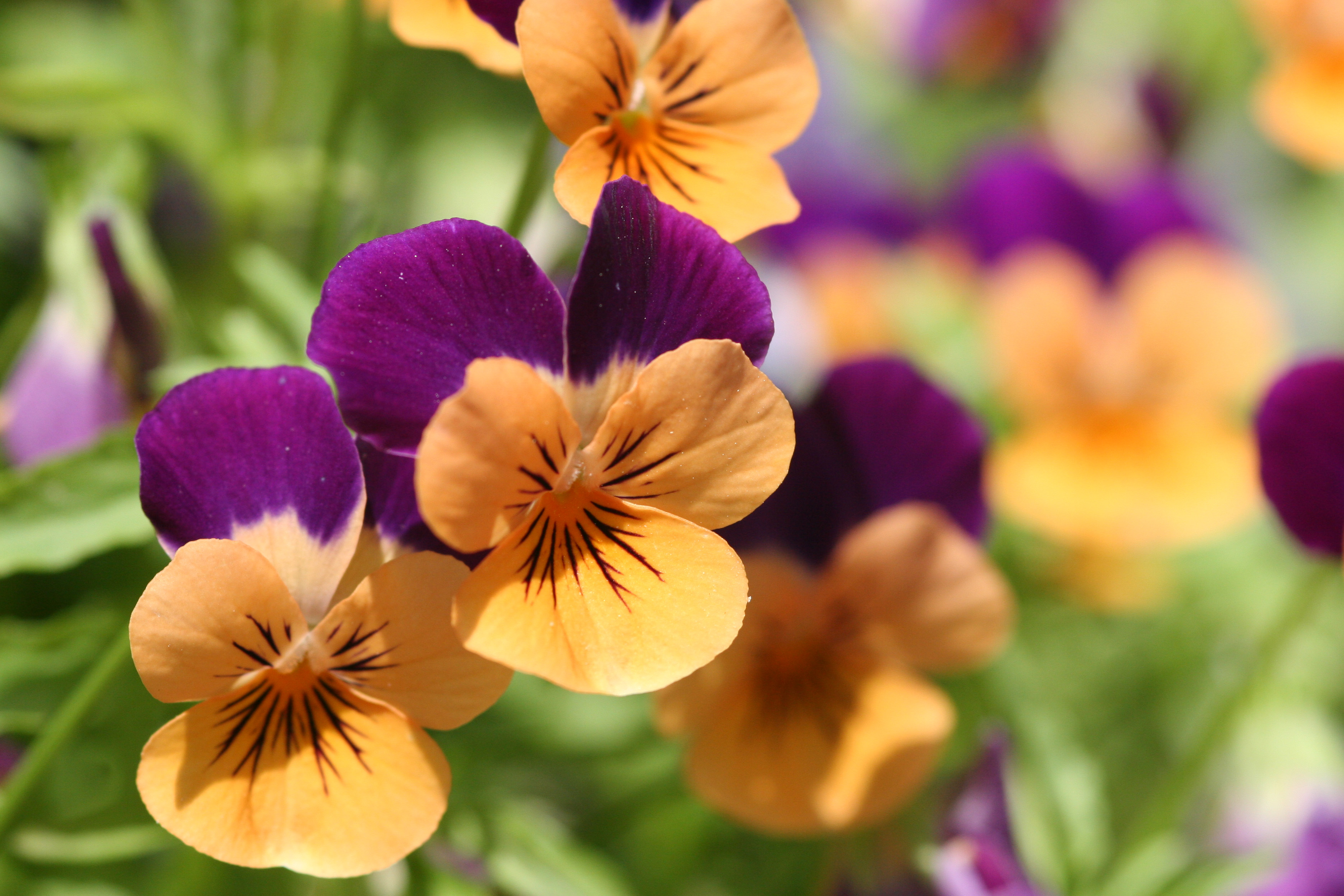

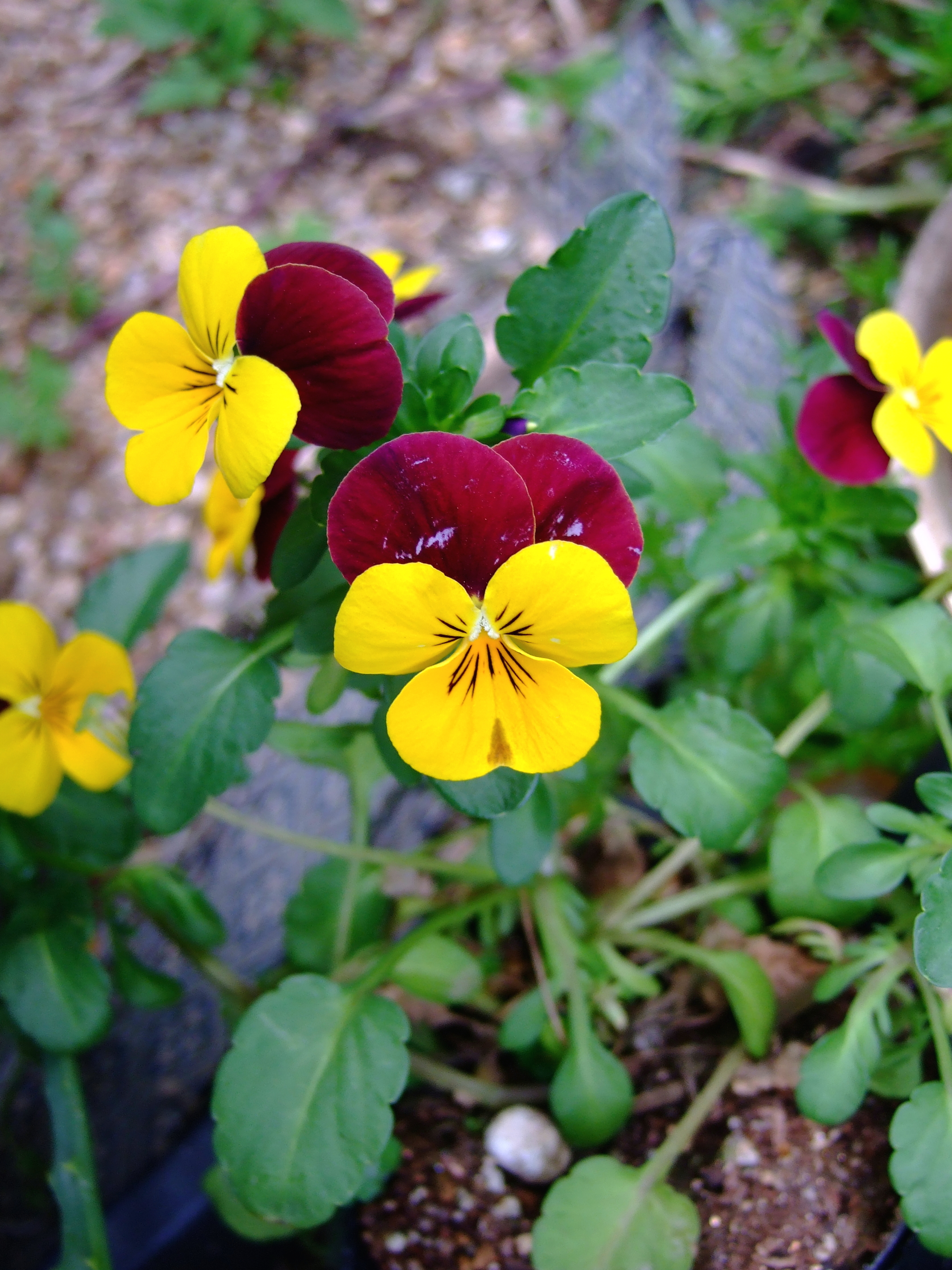

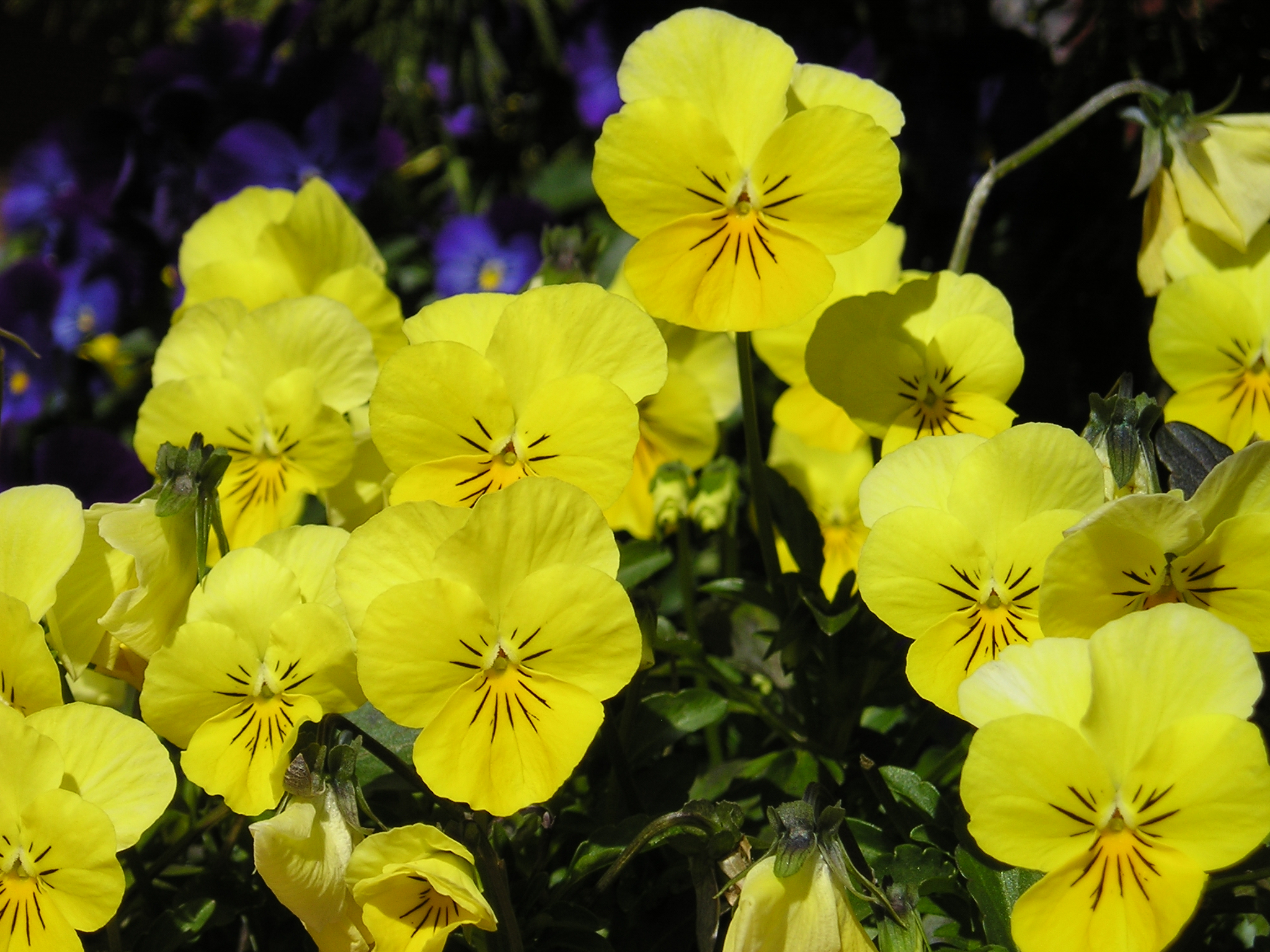

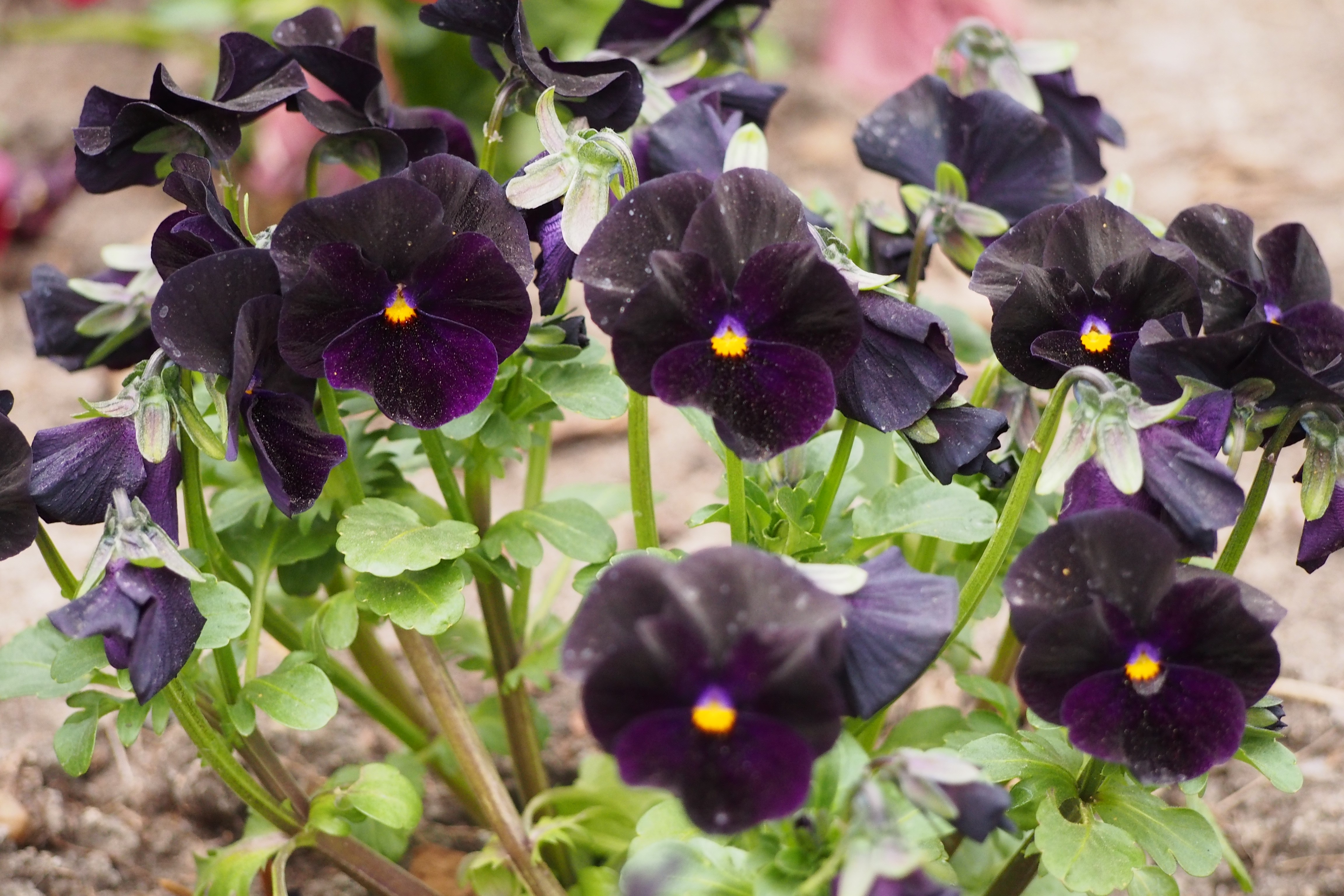

== Bibliography ==
- MBG (2020). "Viola cornuta". Plant finder.
- "Viola ×williamsii". Plant Encyclopaedia. Alpine Garden Society. 2018.
- "Viola, Horned Violet, Tufted Pansy 'King Henry'". Dave's Garden. 2020.
