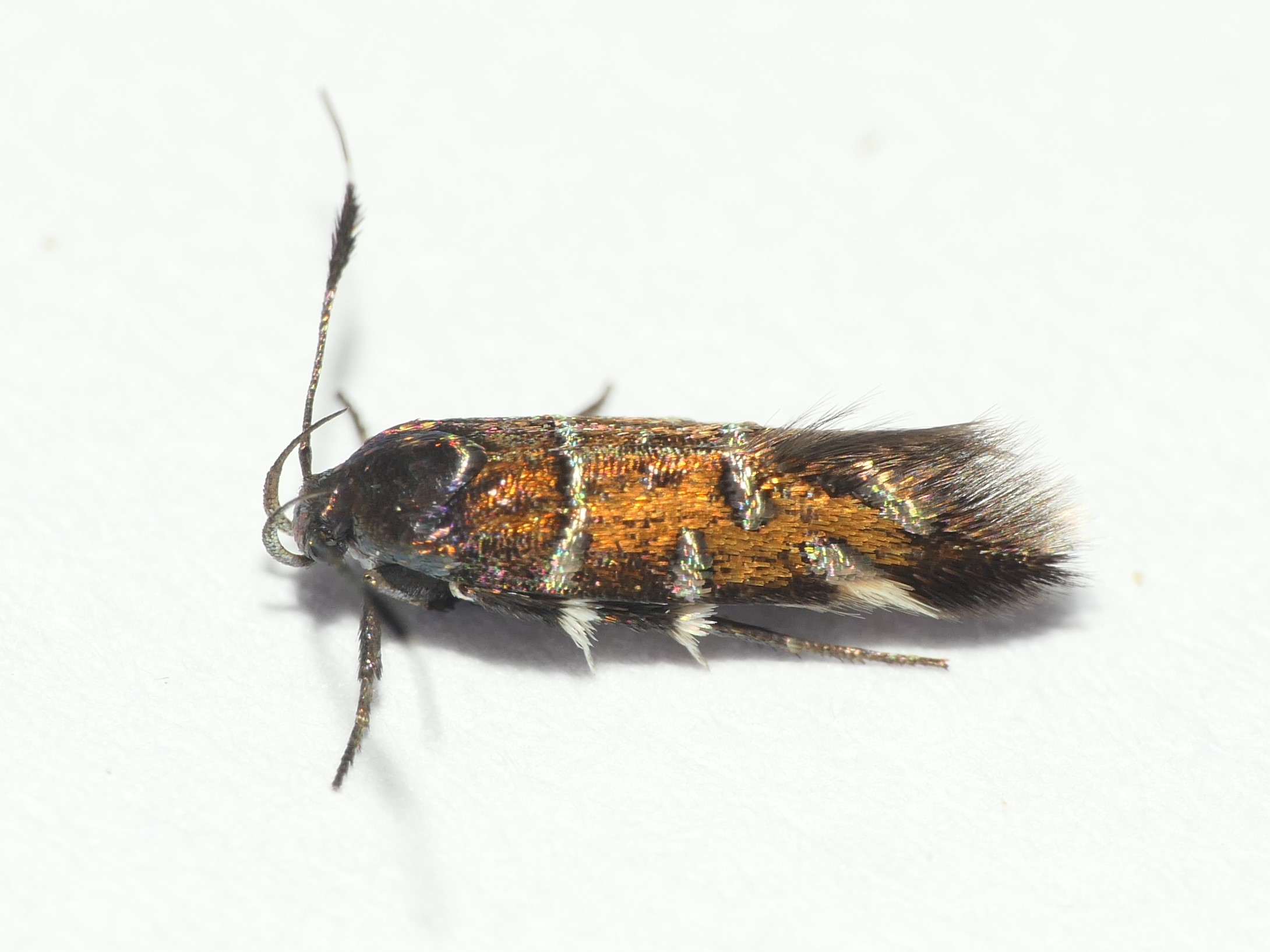

Scientific classification
- Kingdom: Animalia
- Phylum: Arthropoda
- Class: Insecta
- Order: Lepidoptera
- Family: Cosmopterigidae
- Genus: Pancalia
- Species: P. nodosella

Binomial name
- Pancalia nodosella (Bruand, 1851)

Synonyms
- Oecophora nodosella Bruand, 1851; Oecophora nodosella Mann, 1854

= Pancalia nodosella =

Species of moth

Pancalia nodosella is a moth in the family Cosmopterigidae. It is found in Portugal, Spain, France, the Netherlands, Germany, Austria, Italy, Slovenia, Slovakia, most of the Balkan Peninsula, Ukraine, Latvia and Russia. In the east, the range extends through the Caucasus and Central Asia to Kyrgyzstan.

The wingspan is 12–16 mm. Adults are on wing in May.

The larvae feed on Viola curtisii. Larvae can be found from June to July.
