= Pancalia gaedikei =

Scientific classification
- Kingdom: Animalia
- Phylum: Arthropoda
- Clade: Pancrustacea
- Class: Insecta
- Order: Lepidoptera
- Family: Cosmopterigidae
- Genus: Pancalia
- Species: P. gaedikei

Binomial name
- Pancalia gaedikei Sinev, 1985

Species of moth

Pancalia gaedikei is a moth in the family Cosmopterigidae. It is found in Khabarovsk Krai, Russia.
