= Pancalia isshikii =

Scientific classification
- Domain: Eukaryota
- Kingdom: Animalia
- Phylum: Arthropoda
- Class: Insecta
- Order: Lepidoptera
- Family: Cosmopterigidae
- Genus: Pancalia
- Species: P. isshikii

Binomial name
- Pancalia isshikii Matsamura, 1931

Species of moth

Pancalia isshikii is a moth in the family Cosmopterigidae. It is found on the islands of Hokkaido and Honshu of Japan and Russia.
