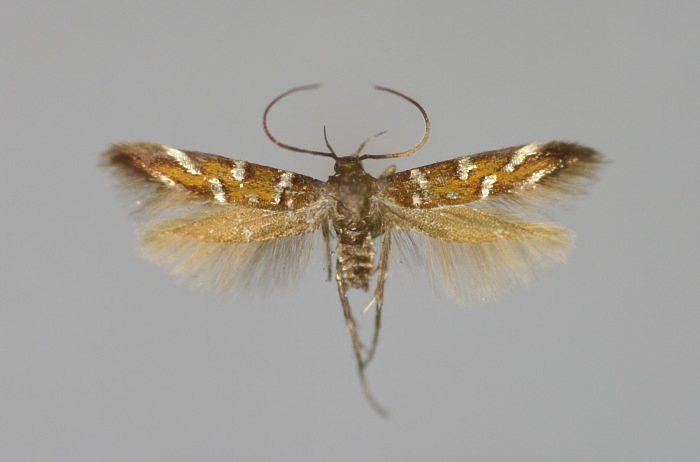
- Pancalia schwarzella

Scientific classification
- Domain: Eukaryota
- Kingdom: Animalia
- Phylum: Arthropoda
- Class: Insecta
- Order: Lepidoptera
- Family: Cosmopterigidae
- Subfamily: Antequerinae
- Genus: Pancalia; Stephens, 1829

= Pancalia =

Genus of moths

Pancalia is a genus of moths in the family Cosmopterigidae.

== Species ==
- Pancalia amurella Gaedike, 1967
- Pancalia aureatus C.K. Yang, 1977
- Pancalia baldizzonella Riedl 1994
- Pancalia gaedikei Sinev, 1985
- Pancalia hexachrysa (Meyrick, 1935)
- Pancalia isshikii Matsamura, 1931
- Pancalia leuwenhoekella (Linnaeus, 1761)
- Pancalia nodosella (Bruand, 1851)
- Pancalia pyrophracta (Meyrick, 1924)
- Pancalia sichotella Christoph, 1882
- Pancalia sinense Gaedike, 1967
- Pancalia schwarzella (Fabricius, 1798)
- Pancalia swetlanae Sinev, 1985
- Pancalia wuyiensis Z.W. Zhang & H.H. Li, 2009

== Selected former species ==
- Pancalia didesmococcusphaga Yang, 1977
