= Pancalia hexachrysa =

Scientific classification
- Kingdom: Animalia
- Phylum: Arthropoda
- Class: Insecta
- Order: Lepidoptera
- Family: Cosmopterigidae
- Genus: Pancalia
- Species: P. hexachrysa

Binomial name
- Pancalia hexachrysa (Meyrick, 1935)

Synonyms
- Chrysoclista hexachrysa Meyrick, 1935

Species of moth

Pancalia hexachrysa is a moth of the family Cosmopterigidae. It was described by Edward Meyrick in 1935. It is found in Japan and Russia.

The wingspan is 12–14 mm.
