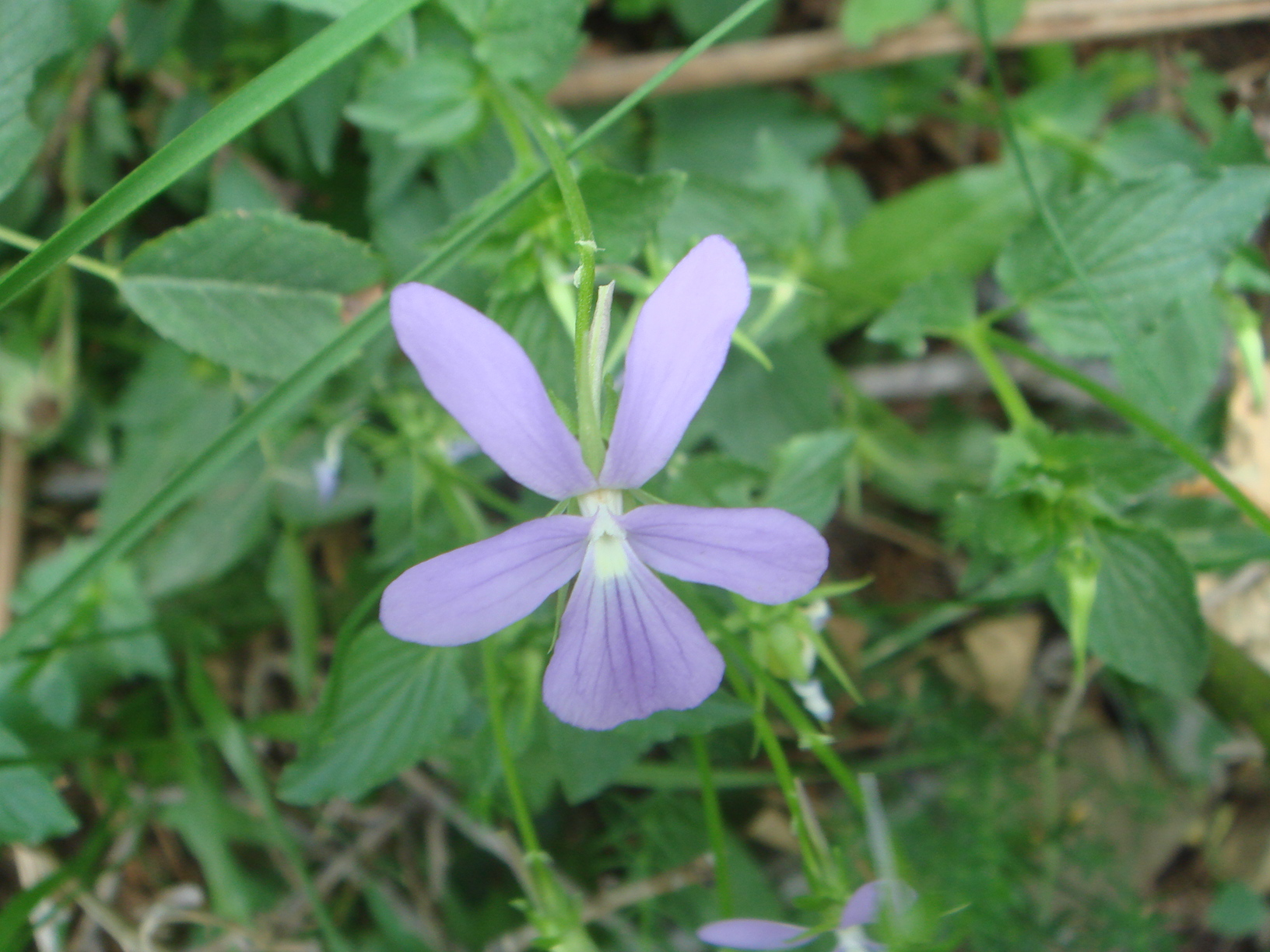

Scientific classification
- Kingdom: Plantae
- Clade: Embryophytes
- Clade: Tracheophytes
- Clade: Spermatophytes
- Clade: Angiosperms
- Clade: Eudicots
- Clade: Rosids
- Order: Malpighiales
- Family: Violaceae
- Genus: Viola
- Species: V. cornuta

Binomial name
- Viola cornuta L.

= Viola cornuta =

Species of flowering plant

Viola cornuta, known as horned pansy or horned violet, is a species of flowering plant in the violet family Violaceae, native to the Pyrenees and the Cordillera Cantábrica of northern Spain at an altitude of 1,000–2,300 metres (3,300–7,500 ft). It is a low-growing, clump-forming temperate evergreen perennial, reaching 50 cm (20 in) in height and spread. It has mid-green ovate leaves with rounded teeth, and masses of delicate pale violet flowers in early summer. The flower consists of five strap-shaped petals with a slender spur.

This plant, and the white-flowered Alba Group, have gained the Royal Horticultural Society's Award of Garden Merit.

It is a known host of the pathogenic fungus Puccinia violae.

== Cultivation ==
Viola cornuta is hardy to USDA zones 6–11 (hardy in the UK to −15 °C (5 °F)). Many cultivars are hybrids with Viola × wittrockiana, designated as Viola × williamsii. Some of these, such as 'King Henry', may be hardy to zone 4.

== Bibliography ==
- MBG (2020). "Viola cornuta". Plant finder.
- "Viola ×williamsii". Plant Encyclopaedia. Alpine Garden Society. 2018.
- "Viola, Horned Violet, Tufted Pansy 'King Henry'". Dave's Garden. 2020.
