= Pancalia wuyiensis =

Scientific classification
- Kingdom: Animalia
- Phylum: Arthropoda
- Class: Insecta
- Order: Lepidoptera
- Family: Cosmopterigidae
- Genus: Pancalia
- Species: P. wuyiensis

Binomial name
- Pancalia wuyiensis Z.W. Zhang & H.H. Li, 2009

Species of moth

Pancalia wuyiensis is a moth in the family Cosmopterigidae. It was described by Z.W. Zhang and H.H. Li in 2009. It is found in China (Fujian).
