= Pancalia swetlanae =

Scientific classification
- Kingdom: Animalia
- Phylum: Arthropoda
- Clade: Pancrustacea
- Class: Insecta
- Order: Lepidoptera
- Family: Cosmopterigidae
- Genus: Pancalia
- Species: P. swetlanae

Binomial name
- Pancalia swetlanae Sinev, 1985

Species of moth

Pancalia swetlanae is a Russian moth in the family Cosmopterigidae. It was first described by Sinev in 1985.

== Bibliography ==
- Natural History Museum Lepidoptera generic names catalog
