= Pancalia amurella =

Scientific classification
- Kingdom: Animalia
- Phylum: Arthropoda
- Clade: Pancrustacea
- Class: Insecta
- Order: Lepidoptera
- Family: Cosmopterigidae
- Genus: Pancalia
- Species: P. amurella

Binomial name
- Pancalia amurella Gaedike, 1967

Synonyms
- Pancalia isshikii amurella

Species of moth

Pancalia amurella is a moth in the family Cosmopterigidae. It was described by Reinhard Gaedike in 1967. It is found in the Russian Far East and China.
