= Pancalia pyrophracta =

Scientific classification
- Kingdom: Animalia
- Phylum: Arthropoda
- Class: Insecta
- Order: Lepidoptera
- Family: Cosmopterigidae
- Genus: Pancalia
- Species: P. pyrophracta

Binomial name
- Pancalia pyrophracta (Meyrick, 1923)

Synonyms
- Athlostola pyrophracta Meyrick, 1923

Species of moth

Pancalia pyrophracta is a moth in the family Cosmopterigidae. It was described by Edward Meyrick in 1923. It is found in the Assam, India.
