= Pancalia aureatus =

Scientific classification
- Kingdom: Animalia
- Phylum: Arthropoda
- Class: Insecta
- Order: Lepidoptera
- Family: Cosmopterigidae
- Genus: Pancalia
- Species: P. aureatus

Binomial name
- Pancalia aureatus C.K. Yang, 1977

Species of moth

Pancalia aureatus is a moth in the family Cosmopterigidae. It was described by C.K. Yang in 1977. It is found in Beijing, China.
