= Pancalia sichotella =

Scientific classification
- Domain: Eukaryota
- Kingdom: Animalia
- Phylum: Arthropoda
- Class: Insecta
- Order: Lepidoptera
- Family: Cosmopterigidae
- Genus: Pancalia
- Species: P. sichotella

Binomial name
- Pancalia sichotella Christoph, 1882

Species of moth

Pancalia sichotella is a moth in the family Cosmopterigidae. It was described by Hugo Theodor Christoph in 1882. It is found in the Russian Far East.
