= Pancalia sinense =

Scientific classification
- Kingdom: Animalia
- Phylum: Arthropoda
- Clade: Pancrustacea
- Class: Insecta
- Order: Lepidoptera
- Family: Cosmopterigidae
- Genus: Pancalia
- Species: P. sinense

Binomial name
- Pancalia sinense Gaedike, 1967

Species of moth

Pancalia sinense is a moth in the family Cosmopterigidae. It was described by Reinhard Gaedike in 1967. It is found in China.
