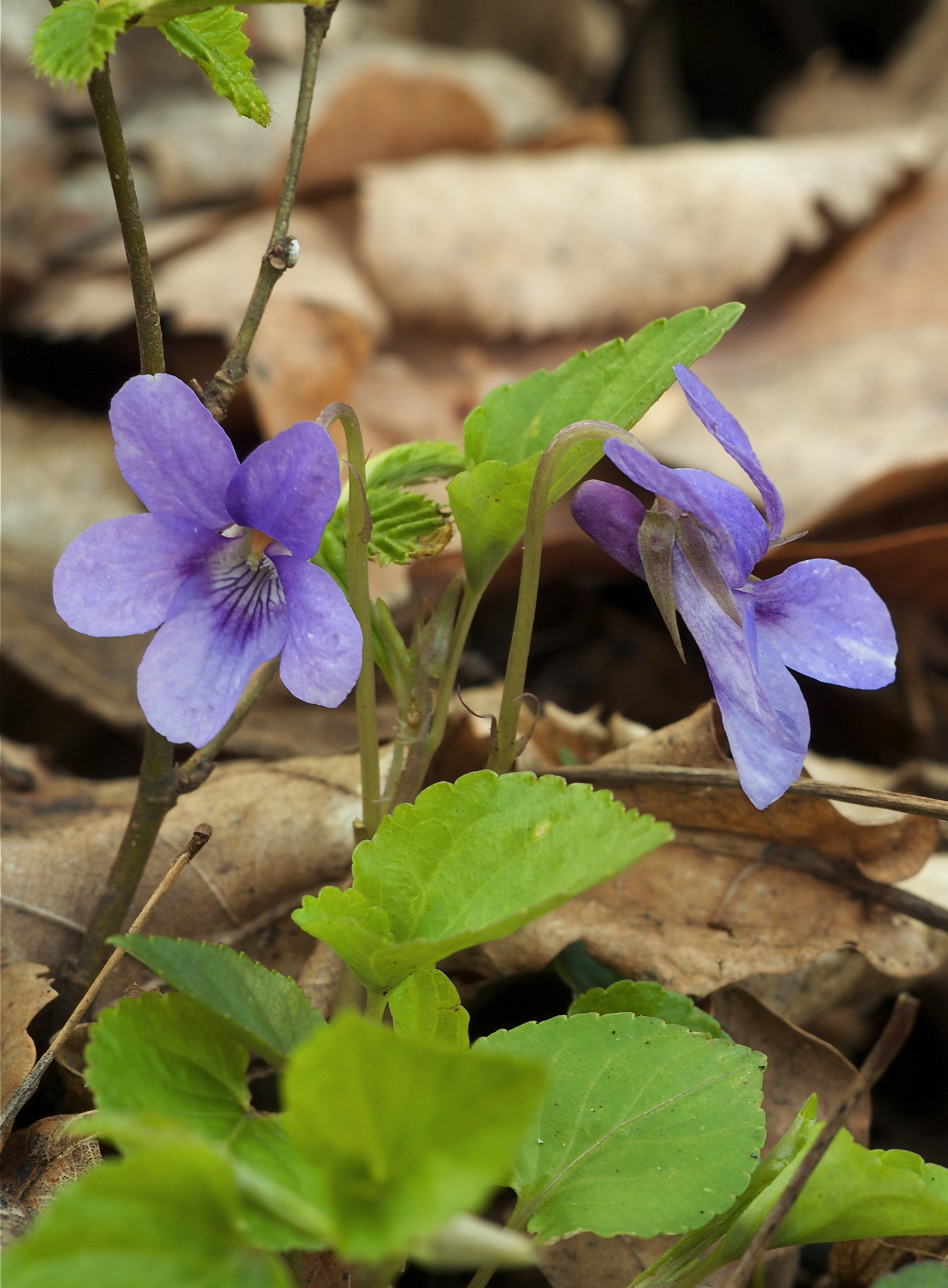

Scientific classification
- Kingdom: Plantae
- Clade: Tracheophytes
- Clade: Angiosperms
- Clade: Eudicots
- Clade: Rosids
- Order: Malpighiales
- Family: Violaceae
- Genus: Viola
- Species: V. reichenbachiana

Binomial name
- Viola reichenbachiana Jord. ex Boreau 1857

= Viola reichenbachiana =

Species of plant

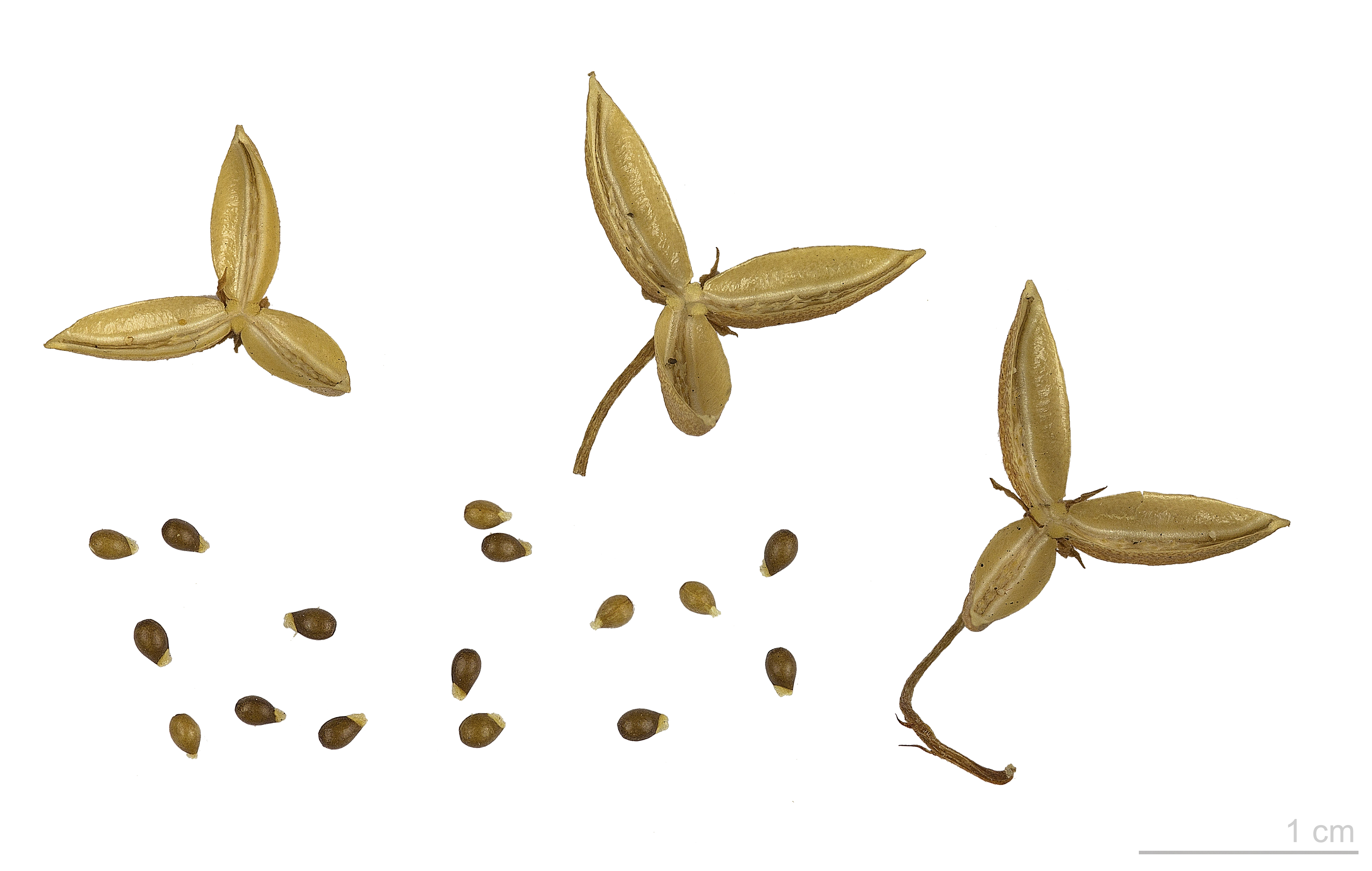
Viola reichenbachiana - MHNT

Viola reichenbachiana, also known as the early dog-violet, pale wood violet, slender wood violet, hedge violet, or wood dog violet, is a species of flowering plant in the Viola genus. This species hybridises with Viola riviniana, the common dog-violet, to produce Viola × bavarica. The plant is named after the 19th-century botanist Ludwig Reichenbach. It is a rhizomatous herbaceous perennial that is widely known for its purple petals, and it typically resides along road banks or among other rich vegetation, as other wild pansies do. The name dog violet refers to its lack of scent, making it supposedly only fit for dogs.

== Description ==
Viola reichenbachiana grows to 5–15 cm (2.0–5.9 in) in height and 10–50 cm (3.9–19.7 in) in spread. The leaf orientation is simple and grows alternately. The plant has wide, heart-shaped blades with rounded, tooth-like ridges. The leaves may be hairless or very slightly textured, and their tips may be pointed or hooked. Its upper leaves tend to be smaller and darker in color. Its leaf typically has 4 or 5 veins on either side of a main vein called the midrib.

The flower of Viola reichenbachiana is bisexual, containing both male and female reproductive structures. It has 3 or 5 narrow, non-overlapping petals that are a signature dull purple. The flower typically has 5 small, pointed sepals, 5 stamens, and 1 carpel. These flowers can range from 1.5 to 2 cm across. They can be recognized by their star-like appearance due to the separated petals or their deep violet-blue spurs. Pollination can occur via insects, self-pollination, or cross-pollination.

Its seeds have rather thick cotyledons to nourish the embryo, and the fruits that develop around them usually have 3 lobes. The roots have many root hairs for absorption and grow rhizomatously, meaning they propagate through above-ground runners known as stolons.

== Cultivation ==
Viola reichenbachiana is found throughout central Europe spanning all the way to parts of Asia around the Himalayan Mountains. It resides in regions such as England, Scotland, Wales, North Africa, China, India, and Pakistan. Its natural habitats include hardwood forests or other wooded areas with broad leaves. It grows most successfully under maximum or partial sunlight and moderate watering, and the minimum temperature at which it can survive is -20 degrees Celsius. It thrives in acidic to neutral fertile soil that is damp but well-drained. They normally take approximately 3 years to reach maturity, and are grown mainly for the aesthetic of their distinct flowers. Its flowers typically bloom between late February and May, and its fruits are produced from May to August.

The plant faces predation by slugs, snails, red spider mites, gall midges, and aphids, and it is also the food source for fritillary butterfly larvae. Common diseases include the browning of petals and leaves due to anthracnose fungus, powdery mildew, stem rot, rust on leaf undersides, and smut pustules on leaf stalks that discharge spores.

=== RHS Hardiness ===
The Royal Horticultural Society recognizes V. reichenbachiana as an H6 on the Hardiness Scale, meaning that it is "hardy in all of UK and northern Europe", and its minimum temperature ranges are -20 to -15 degrees Celsius.
