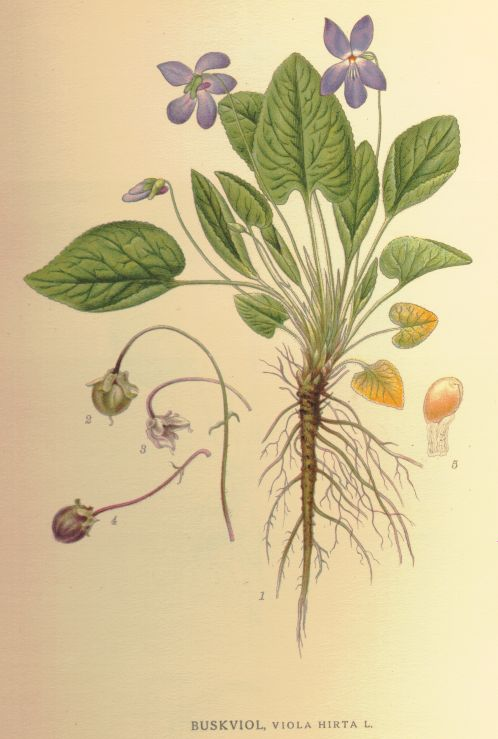

Scientific classification
- Kingdom: Plantae
- Clade: Tracheophytes
- Clade: Angiosperms
- Clade: Eudicots
- Clade: Rosids
- Order: Malpighiales
- Family: Violaceae
- Genus: Viola
- Species: V. hirta

Binomial name
- Viola hirta L.

= Viola hirta =

Hairy violet

Species of flowering plant

Viola hirta is a species of the plant genus Viola. It is also called the hairy violet. As with the sweet violet, no fossil seeds of this species have been found. It is confined to the cold temperate zone, in Europe, north and west Asia, extending as far as northwest India. It is absent in Wales from Brecon and Radnor, Pembroke, Cardigan, Merioneth, and from Mid Lancs, and the Isle of Man, but elsewhere it is universal. In Scotland it does not occur in Roxburgh, Berwick, Haddington, Edinburgh, Fife, Forfar, Kincardine. From Forfar it ranges to the south of England, and is found at a height of 1000 ft. in Yorks. It occurs also in Ireland.

== Location ==
The hairy violet is found on dry banks, and in woods, preferring drier conditions. It may be found in damper areas in woods in low-lying situations. This species has a less wide range than sweet violet (Viola odorata). Note it is considered by some sources to be the same species as Viola odorata.

== Habit ==
The habit is prostrate like that of the sweet violet, which also has no erect stem, the leaves arising from the rootstock directly. The leaves are likewise heart-shaped, but in this case the stoles or trailing stems with buds are absent or very short, and the bracts are below the middle of the flower-stalk. Moreover, the whole plant is hairy, or roughly hairy, giving it a greyer, less green, appearance when dry.
