= Dave's Garden =

- Owner: Internet Brands
- Creator: Dave Whitinger
- Website: davesgarden.com
- Commercial: Yes
- Registration: Optional
- Launched: 22 September 2000; 26 years ago
- Current status: Online

Dave's Garden is an informational website for gardening enthusiasts founded by Dave Whitinger. The website is owned by Internet Brands. Whitinger left the website in 2010 and is now the executive director of the National Gardening Association.
