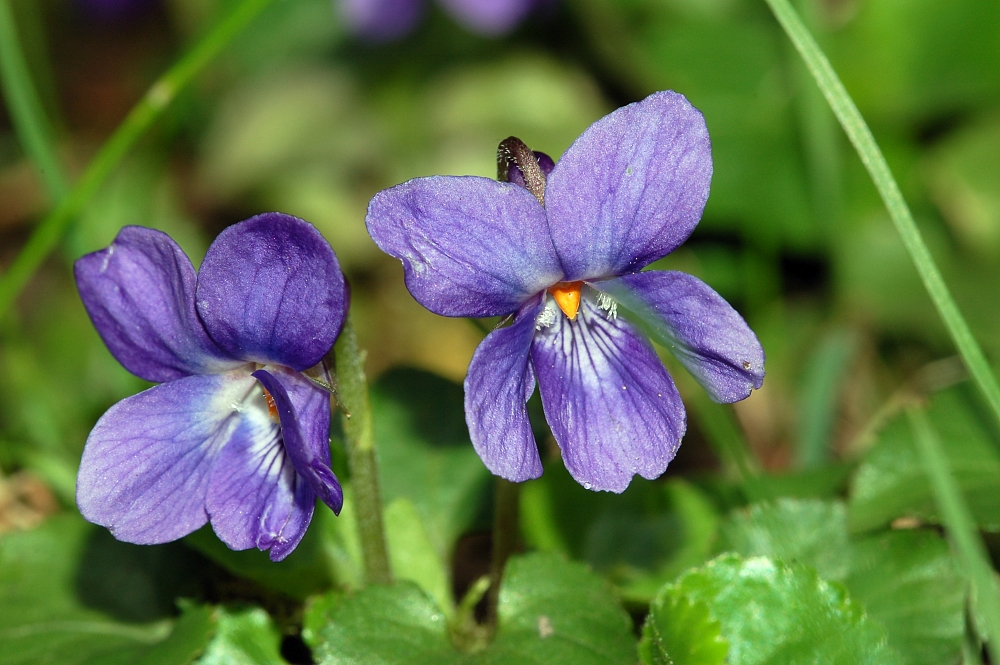

Conservation status
- Least Concern (IUCN 3.1)

Scientific classification
- Kingdom: Plantae
- Clade: Tracheophytes
- Clade: Angiosperms
- Clade: Eudicots
- Clade: Rosids
- Order: Malpighiales
- Family: Violaceae
- Genus: Viola
- Species: V. odorata

Binomial name
- Viola odorata L.

Subspecies
- Viola odorata subsp. odorata; Viola odorata subsp. stolonifera (J.J.Rodr.) J.J.Orell & Romo

Synonyms
- Viola hirta var. odorata (L.) Fiori; Viola hirta subsp. odorata (L.) Fiori; Viola martii subsp. odorata (L.) Schimp. & Spenn.

= Viola odorata =

Species of flowering plant

Viola odorata is a species of flowering plant in the family Violaceae. The small hardy herbaceous perennial is commonly known as wood violet, sweet violet, English violet, common violet, florist's violet, or garden violet.

The plant is native to Eurasia. The leaves and flowers are edible and have been used to make fragrances.

== Description ==
Viola odorata spreads with stolons (above-ground shoots). The plant reaches 15 centimetres (6 in) in height. The leaves and stems are all in a basal rosette. The leaf stalks have downward-pointing hairs. The leaves are kidney-shaped and reach 6 cm (2 1/2 in) long.

The flowers are normally either dark violet or white and are scented. The style is hooked (and does not end with a rounded appendage). The perennial flowers mature when the plant is at a height of 10–15 cm (4–6 in) and a spread of 20–61 cm (8–24 in).

=== Chemistry ===
The plant contains the alkaloid violin, about 30 cyclotides, and triterpenoids, mostly as constituents of the essential oil.

== Subspecies ==
Two subspecies are accepted:

- Viola odorata subsp. odorata – entire range ;
- Viola odorata subsp. stolonifera (J.J.Rodr.) J.J.Orell & Romo – Balearic Islands.

== Distribution and habitat ==
Viola odorata is native to Europe south of Scandinavia, northwest Africa (Morocco, Algeria, and Tunisia), Macaronesia, the Caucasus, Western Asia, and Kazakhstan. It has been introduced to the Americas, Scandinavia, southern and eastern Asia, Australia, and New Zealand. The species can be found near the edges of forests or in clearings; it is also a common "uninvited guest" in shaded lawns or elsewhere in gardens.

== Uses ==
The leaves and flowers are edible. Real violet flower extract is available for culinary uses, especially in European countries. The French are known for their violet syrup, most commonly made from an extract of violets. In the United States, this French violet syrup is used to make violet scones and marshmallows.

Several cultivars have been selected for garden use, of which V. odorata 'Wellsiana' has gained the Royal Horticultural Society's Award of Garden Merit.

The sweet scent of this flower has proved popular, particularly in the late Victorian period, and has consequently been used in the production of many cosmetic fragrances and perfumes. There is some doubt as to whether the true extract of the violet flower is still used commercially in perfumes. It was still used in the early 20th century, but by the time Steffen Arctander was writing in the late 1950s and early 1960s, production had "almost disappeared". Violet leaf absolute, however, remains widely used in modern perfumery.

The scent of violet flowers is distinctive with only a few other flowers having a remotely similar odor. References to violets and the desirable nature of the fragrance go back to classical sources such as Pliny and Horace when the name "Ion" was in use to describe this flower from which the name of the distinctive chemical constituents of the flower, the ionones, is derived. In 1923, W. A. Poucher wrote that the flowers were widely cultivated both in Europe and the East for their fragrance, with both the flowers and leaves being separately collected and extracted for fragrance, and flowers also collected for use in confectionery galenical syrup and in the production of medicine.

The plant contains a cannabinoid peptide called "vodo-C1" that acts in vitro as a selective CB2 receptor agonist without CB1 activity.

== In culture ==
The violet flower was a favorite in ancient Greece and became the symbol of Athens. Aphrodite is called "violet-crowned Cytherea". The scent suggested sex, so the violet was also an emblematic flower of her son, Priapus, the deity of gardens and generation.

Iamus was a son of Apollo and the nymph Evadne. He was abandoned by his mother at birth. She left him lying in the Arkadian wilds on a bed of violets where he was fed honey by serpents. Eventually, he was discovered by passing shepherds who named him Iamus after the violet (ion) bed.

The goddess Persephone and her companion Nymphs were gathering rose, crocus, violet, iris, lily, and larkspur blooms in a springtime meadow when she was abducted by the god Hades.

The blood of Attis and his bride, Ia, turned into violets: violets sprang from Attis’s blood and encircled the pine beneath which he died, while Ia’s blood became purple violets. Arnobius connects the flowers with the ritual adornment of the sacred pine.

== Gallery ==
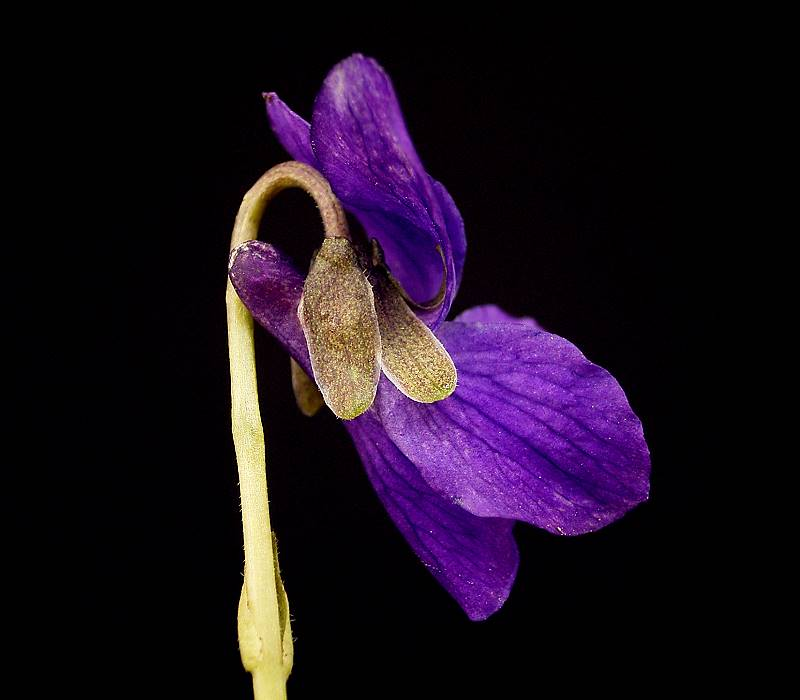

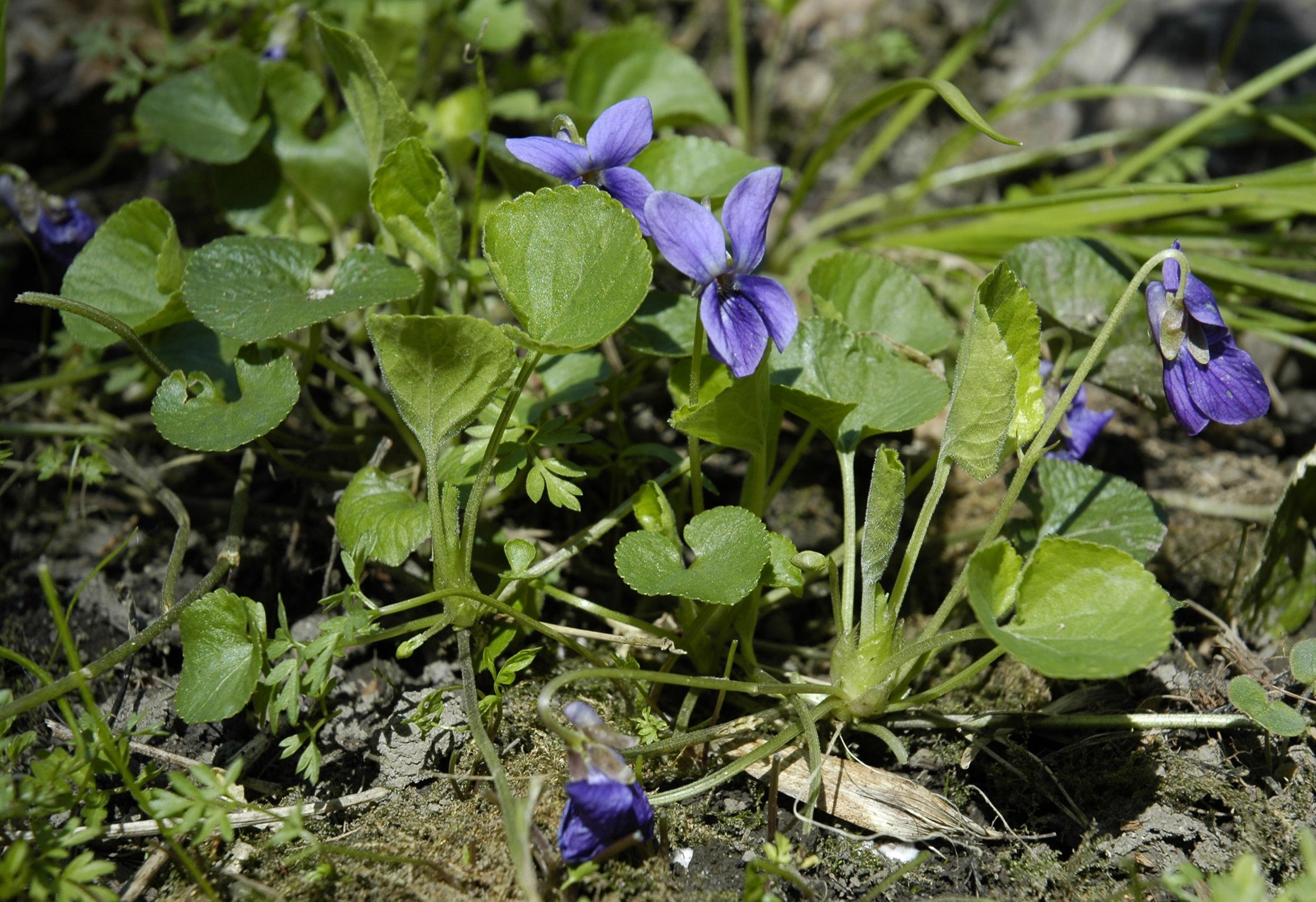
Form, with stolons visible

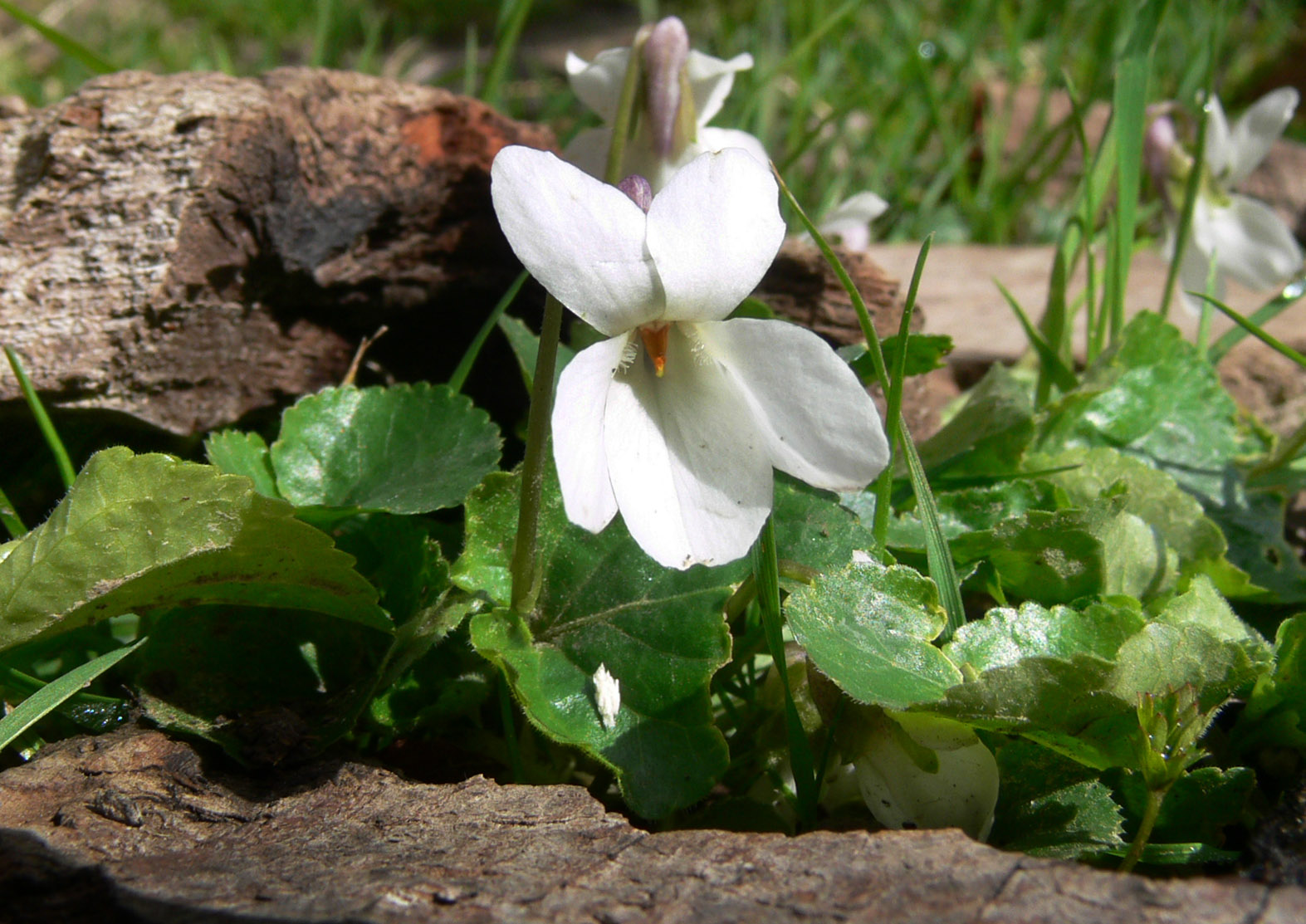
White V. odorata

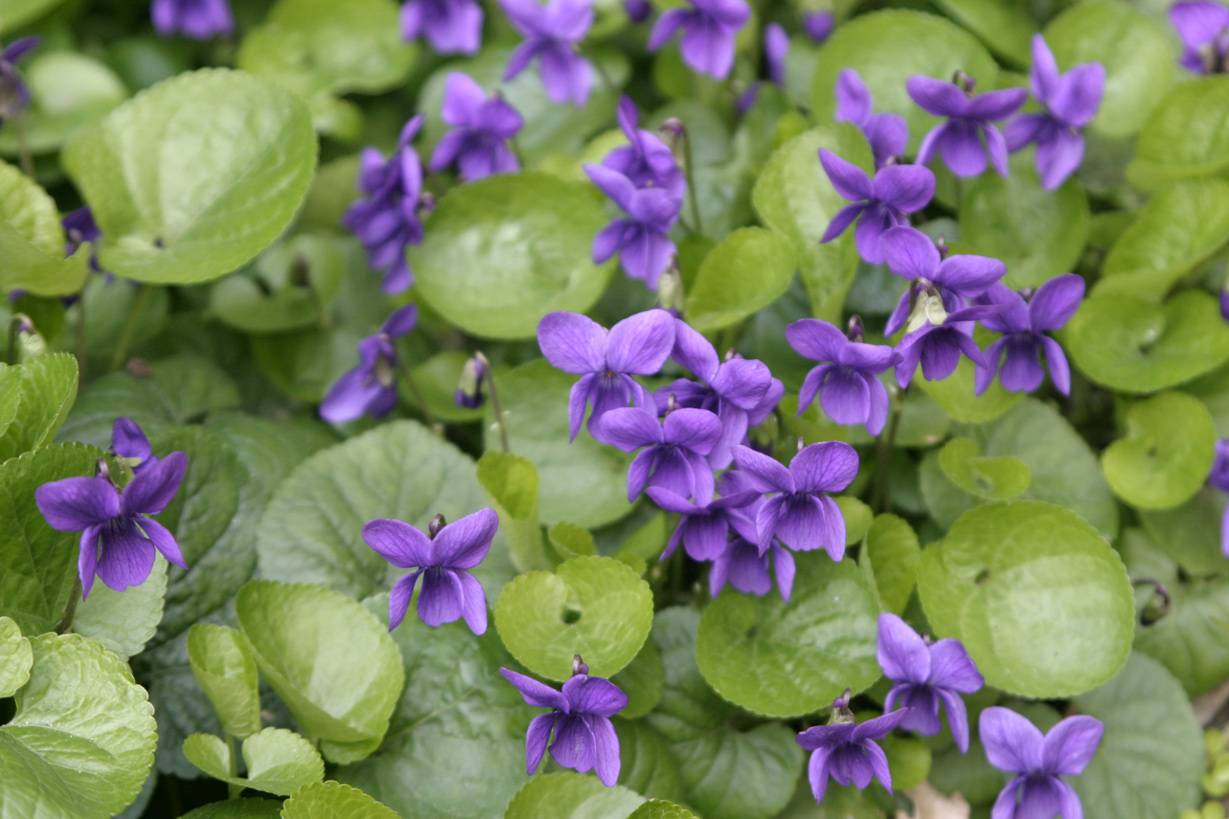
