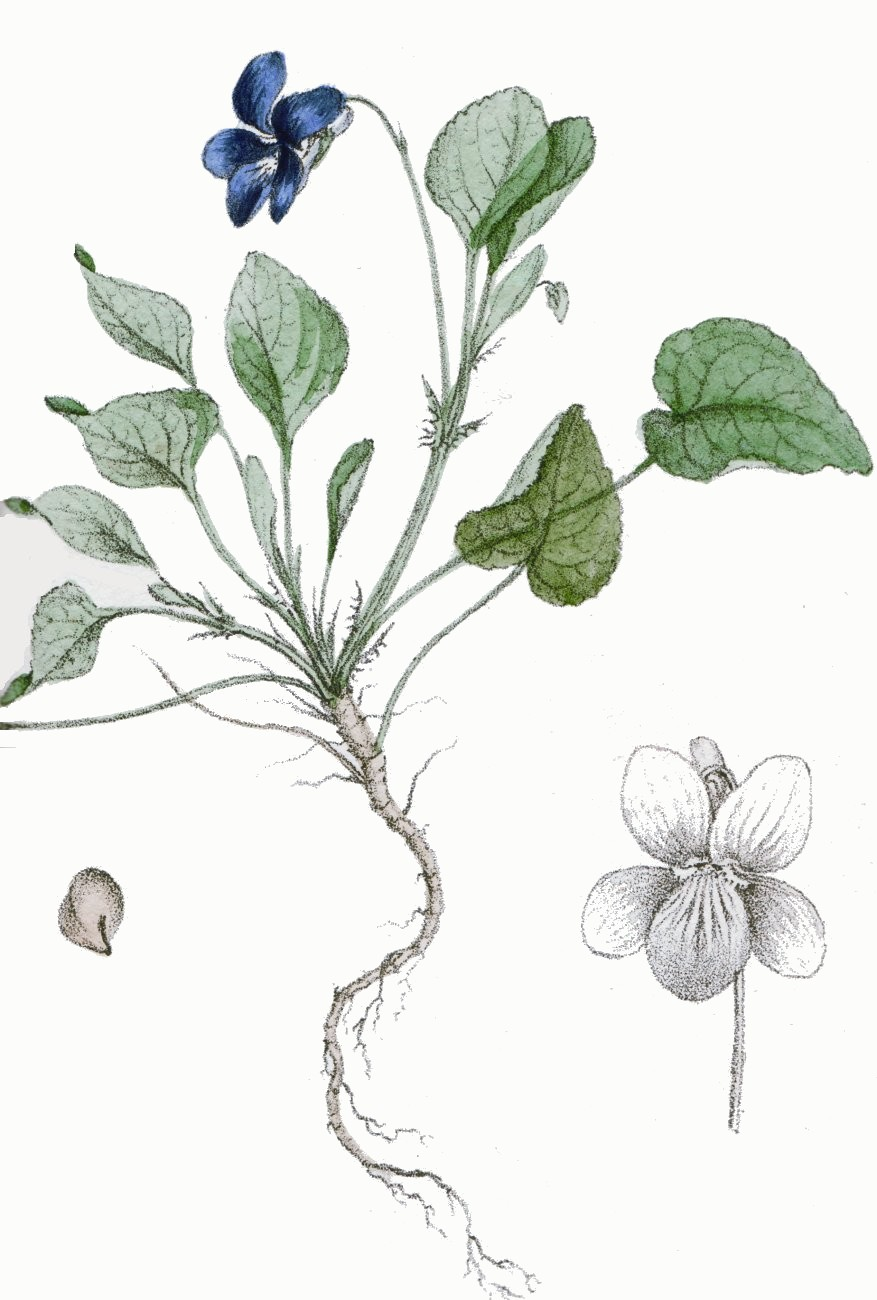

Scientific classification
- Kingdom: Plantae
- Clade: Tracheophytes
- Clade: Angiosperms
- Clade: Eudicots
- Clade: Rosids
- Order: Malpighiales
- Family: Violaceae
- Genus: Viola
- Species: V. canina

Binomial name
- Viola canina L.

= Viola canina =

Species of flowering plant

Viola canina, commonly known as heath dog-violet and heath violet, is a species of the flowering plant in the violet family Violaceae. It is native to Europe, where it is found in heaths, fens, and moist woodlands, especially on acidic soils.

It is a herbaceous perennial plant growing to 5–15 cm (2.0–5.9 in) tall. The flowers are pale blue, produced from April to July. Colonies of plants may be extensive.

It is host to the pathogenic fungi Puccinia violae and Ramularia lactea.
