= Chrysopeleiinae =

Scientific classification
- Kingdom: Animalia
- Phylum: Arthropoda
- Class: Insecta
- Order: Lepidoptera
- Family: Cosmopterigidae
- Subfamily: Chrysopeleiinae; Mosher, 1916

Synonyms
- Chrysopeleiidae; Walshiidae Hodges, 1962

Subfamily of moths

The Chrysopeleiinae are a subfamily of the Cosmopterigidae, although some authors treat it as a full family, the Chrysopeleiidae.

== Distribution ==
The subfamily is distributed mostly in Central Asia, southern Asia, Africa and in America. In the Palearctic realm, over 50 species are found, with 16 species in six genera found in Europe.

== Genera ==
- Afeda (Nearctic)
- Ascalenia (Palearctic, African, Australia)
- Bifascioides
- Cholotis
- Chrysopeleia (Nearctic)
- Eumenodora
- Gisilia (Palearctic & African)
- Ithome (Nearctic & Neotropical)
- Melanozestis
- Melnea
- Nepotula (Nearctic)
- Obithome (Nearctic)
- Perimede (Nearctic & Neotropical)
- Periploca (Nearctic & Palearctic)
- Pristen (Nearctic)
- Prochola
- Siskiwitia (Nearctic)
- Sorhagenia (Palearctic & Nearctic)
- Stilbosis (most species but 2 from the Americas)
- Walshia (Nearctic & Neotropical)

== Placement uncertain ==
The following genera are alternatively placed in the subfamily Cosmopteriginae:

- Leptozestis
- Orthromicta
- Synploca (Nearctic)
- Trachydora

== Formerly placed here ==
- Eumenodora (India/Australia)
