= Stilbosis rhynchosiae =

Scientific classification
- Kingdom: Animalia
- Phylum: Arthropoda
- Clade: Pancrustacea
- Class: Insecta
- Order: Lepidoptera
- Family: Cosmopterigidae
- Genus: Stilbosis
- Species: S. rhynchosiae

Binomial name
- Stilbosis rhynchosiae (Hodges, 1964)

Synonyms
- Aeaea rhynchosiae Hodges, 1964

Species of moth

Stilbosis rhynchosiae is a moth in the family Cosmopterigidae. It was described by Ronald W. Hodges in 1964. It is found in North America, where it has been recorded from Tennessee.

The larvae feed on Rhynchosia tomentosa.
