= Glycine mollis =

Glycine mollis can refer to:

- Glycine mollis Hook., a synonym of Rhynchosia malacophylla (Spreng.) Bojer
- Glycine mollis Wight & Arn., a synonym of Teramnus labialis subsp. labialis (L.f.) Spreng.
- Glycine mollis Willd., a synonym of Cajanus scarabaeoides (L.) Thouars
