= Ithome (moth) =

Scientific classification
- Kingdom: Animalia
- Phylum: Arthropoda
- Clade: Pancrustacea
- Class: Insecta
- Order: Lepidoptera
- Family: Cosmopterigidae
- Subfamily: Chrysopeleiinae
- Genus: Ithome; Chambers, 1875

Synonyms
- Eriphia V.T. Chambers, 1875 (junior homonym)

Genus of moths

Ithome is a genus of moths in the family Cosmopterigidae.

== Species ==
- Ithome anthraceuta (Meyrick, 1915)
- Ithome aquila Hodges, 1978
- Ithome cathidrota (Meyrick, 1915)
- Ithome chersota (Meyrick, 1915)
- Ithome concolorella (Chambers, 1875) (syn: Ithome unimaculella Chambers, 1875, Ithome unomaculella)
- Ithome curvipunctella (Walsingham, 1892) (syn: Eriphia quinquepunctata Forbes, 1931
- Ithome edax Hodges, 1962
- Ithome ferax Hodges, 1962
- Ithome fuscula Forbes, 1931
- Ithome iresiarcha (Meyrick, 1915)
- Ithome lassula Hodges, 1962
- Ithome pelasta (Meyrick, 1915)
- Ithome pernigrella (Forbes, 1931)
- Ithome pignerata (Meyrick, 1922)
- Ithome simulatrix Hodges, 1978
- Ithome tiaynai H.A. Vargas, 2004
- Ithome volcanica Landry, 2001

== Former species ==
- Ithome erransella is now Perimede erransella Chambers, 1874
