= Metriotes =

Scientific classification
- Kingdom: Animalia
- Phylum: Arthropoda
- Clade: Pancrustacea
- Class: Insecta
- Order: Lepidoptera
- Family: Coleophoridae
- Genus: Metriotes; Herrich-Schäffer, 1853

Synonyms
- Aplotes Herrich-Schäffer, 1853 (junior homonym); Asychna Stainton, 1854 (junior objective synonym)

Genus of moths

Metriotes is a genus of moth, belonging to the family Coleophoridae.

== Species ==
- Metriotes jaeckhi Baldizzone, 1985
- Metriotes lutarea (Haworth, 1828)
- Metriotes polygoni (Zeller, 1877)
- Metriotes serratella (Stephens, 1834)
