= Glycine viscosa =

Glycine viscosa may refer to two different species of plants:

- Glycine viscosa Moench, a synonym for Bolusafra bituminosa
- Glycine viscosa Roth., a synonym for Rhynchosia viscosa
