= Nepotula =

Scientific classification
- Kingdom: Animalia
- Phylum: Arthropoda
- Clade: Pancrustacea
- Class: Insecta
- Order: Lepidoptera
- Family: Cosmopterigidae
- Subfamily: Chrysopeleiinae
- Genus: Nepotula; Hodges, 1964
- Species: N. secura

Binomial name
- Nepotula secura Hodges, 1964

Genus of moths

Nepotula is a genus of moth in the family Cosmopterigidae. It contains only one species, Nepotula secura, which is found in North America, where it has been recorded from Florida and South Carolina.
