= Ithome tiaynai =

Scientific classification
- Kingdom: Animalia
- Phylum: Arthropoda
- Class: Insecta
- Order: Lepidoptera
- Family: Cosmopterigidae
- Genus: Ithome
- Species: I. tiaynai

Binomial name
- Ithome tiaynai H.A. Vargas, 2004

Species of moth

Ithome tiaynai is a moth in the family Cosmopterigidae. It is found in northern Chile.

The wingspan is about 9 mm.

The larvae feed on Acacia macracantha.
