= Ithome curvipunctella =

Scientific classification
- Domain: Eukaryota
- Kingdom: Animalia
- Phylum: Arthropoda
- Class: Insecta
- Order: Lepidoptera
- Family: Cosmopterigidae
- Genus: Ithome
- Species: I. curvipunctella

Binomial name
- Ithome curvipunctella (Walsingham, 1892)

Synonyms
- Anybia curvipunctella Walsingham, [1892]; Eriphia quinquepunctata Forbes, 1931

Species of moth

Ithome curvipunctella is a moth in the family Cosmopterigidae. It was described by Thomas de Grey in 1892. It is found in the West Indies (Puerto Rico) and Florida.

The wingspan is about 7 mm for males and 8 mm for females. In Florida, adults have been recorded year round.

The larvae feed on Coccoloba uvifera.
