= Stilbosis =

Scientific classification
- Kingdom: Animalia
- Phylum: Arthropoda
- Clade: Pancrustacea
- Class: Insecta
- Order: Lepidoptera
- Family: Cosmopterigidae
- Subfamily: Chrysopeleiinae
- Genus: Stilbosis; Clemens, 1860

Synonyms
- Aeaea Chambers, 1874; Amaurogramma Braun, 1919

Genus of moths

Stilbosis is a genus of moths in the family Cosmopterigidae.

== Species ==
- Stilbosis alcyonis Meyrick, 1917
- Stilbosis alsocoma Meyrick, 1917
- Stilbosis amphibola Walsingham, 1909
- Stilbosis antibathra (Meyrick, 1914)
- Stilbosis argyritis Meyrick, 1922
- Stilbosis chrysorrhabda Meyrick, 1922
- Stilbosis condylota Meyrick, 1917
- Stilbosis cyclocosma (Meyrick, 1921)
- Stilbosis devoluta Meyrick, 1917
- Stilbosis dulcedo (Hodges, 1964)
- Stilbosis extensa (Braun, 1919)
- Stilbosis gnomonica Meyrick, 1917
- Stilbosis hypanthes Meyrick, 1917
- Stilbosis incincta Walsingham, 1909
- Stilbosis juvantis (Hodges, 1964)
- Stilbosis juvenis Walsingham, 1909
- Stilbosis lonchocarpella Busck, 1934
- Stilbosis nubila Hodges, 1964
- Stilbosis ornatrix Hodges, 1978
- Stilbosis ostryaeella (Chambers, 1874)
- Stilbosis pagina Hodges, 1978
- Stilbosis phaeoptera Forbes, 1931
- Stilbosis placatrix (Hodges, 1969)
- Stilbosis polygoni Zeller, 1877
- Stilbosis quadricustatella (Chambers, 1880) (syn: Stilbosis quadricristatella)
- Stilbosis rhynchosiae (Hodges, 1964)
- Stilbosis risor (Hodges, 1964)
- Stilbosis rotunda Hodges, 1978
- Stilbosis sagana (Hodges, 1964)
- Stilbosis schmitzi B. Landry, 2008
- Stilbosis scleroma Hodges, 1978
- Stilbosis sexgutella (Walker, 1864)
- Stilbosis stipator (Hodges, 1964)
- Stilbosis symphracta Meyrick, 1917
- Stilbosis synclista Meyrick, 1917
- Stilbosis tesquella Clemens, 1860 (syn: Stilbosis tesquatella Chambers, 1878, Laverna quinquicristatella Chambers, 1881)
- Stilbosis turrifera Meyrick, 1921
- Stilbosis venatrix (Hodges, 1964)
- Stilbosis venifica (Hodges, 1964)
- Stilbosis victor (Hodges, 1964)
