= Stilbosis alcyonis =

Scientific classification
- Domain: Eukaryota
- Kingdom: Animalia
- Phylum: Arthropoda
- Class: Insecta
- Order: Lepidoptera
- Family: Cosmopterigidae
- Genus: Stilbosis
- Species: S. alcyonis

Binomial name
- Stilbosis alcyonis Meyrick, 1917

Species of moth

Stilbosis alcyonis is a moth in the family Cosmopterigidae. It was described by Edward Meyrick in 1917. It is found in French Guiana.
