= Ithome ferax =

Scientific classification
- Kingdom: Animalia
- Phylum: Arthropoda
- Clade: Pancrustacea
- Class: Insecta
- Order: Lepidoptera
- Family: Cosmopterigidae
- Genus: Ithome
- Species: I. ferax

Binomial name
- Ithome ferax Hodges, 1962

Species of moth

Ithome ferax is a moth in the family Cosmopterigidae. It was described by Ronald W. Hodges in 1962. I feraz is found in North America, where it has been recorded from Florida.

== Description ==
The wingspan is 7–10 mm.
