= Perimede falcata =

Scientific classification
- Kingdom: Animalia
- Phylum: Arthropoda
- Class: Insecta
- Order: Lepidoptera
- Family: Cosmopterigidae
- Genus: Perimede
- Species: P. falcata

Binomial name
- Perimede falcata Braun, 1919

Species of moth

Perimede falcata is a moth in the family Cosmopterigidae. It was described by Annette Frances Braun in 1919. It is found in North America, where it has been recorded from Ohio, Massachusetts, New York and Illinois to Florida and Louisiana.

The wingspan is 11.5–14 mm. The forewings are shining grayish white, overlaid with purplish dusting. The hindwings are dusted grayish fuscous. Adults have been recorded on wing year round.
