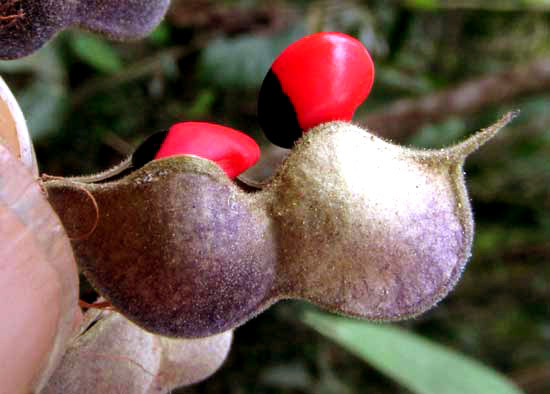
- Rhynchosia precatoria seeds emerging from pod with snout

Scientific classification
- Kingdom: Plantae
- Clade: Embryophytes
- Clade: Tracheophytes
- Clade: Spermatophytes
- Clade: Angiosperms
- Clade: Eudicots
- Clade: Rosids
- Order: Fabales
- Family: Fabaceae
- Subfamily: Faboideae
- Genus: Rhynchosia
- Species: R. precatoria

Binomial name
- Rhynchosia precatoria (Humb. & Bonpl. ex Willd.) DC.

Synonyms
- Dolicholus precatorius (Humb. & Bonpl. ex Willd.) Rose (1906); Glycine precatoria Humb. & Bonpl. ex Willd. (1809); Dolicholus vailiae Rose (1906); Indigofera volubilis Milne (1773); Rhynchosia bicolor Micheli (1903)

= Rhynchosia precatoria =

Species of tree

Rhynchosia precatoria, known variously as rosary snoutbean, 'crab-eyes', or ojo de perico, among other names, is a viny member of the family Fabaceae.

== Description ==
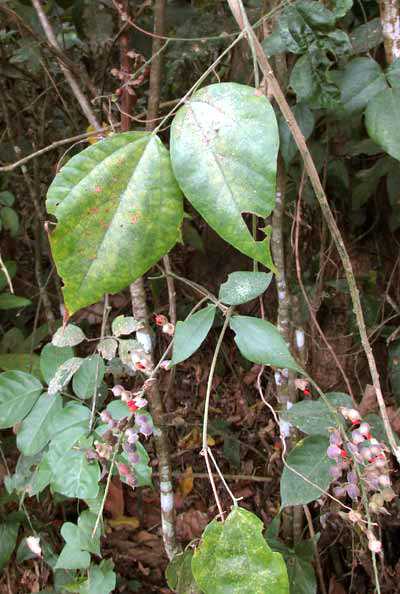
leaves (the larger, yellow-green ones) and clusters of mature pods

Rhynchosia precatoria is an herbaceous, twining or sometimes sprawling vine able to climb several meters (yards) high, at least under ideal conditions. Its stems are hairy, the hairs varying from long and soft to stiff and lying on the stem's surface, sometimes with yellow, dot-like glands mixed among them. Atop petioles which are up to 7cm long (2¾ inches), three hairy leaves are divided into leaflets as long as 12.5cm (~5 inches).

Raceme-type inflorescences are up to 30cm long (~1ft), with individual flowers on pedicels up to 2mm long (5/64 inch). Flowers are dark or brownish purple with yellow stripes, with petals as long as 9mm (23/64 inch). Legume-type fruits split open to release one or two roundish seeds, which are up to 8mm long (5/16 inch), and red with a black spot.

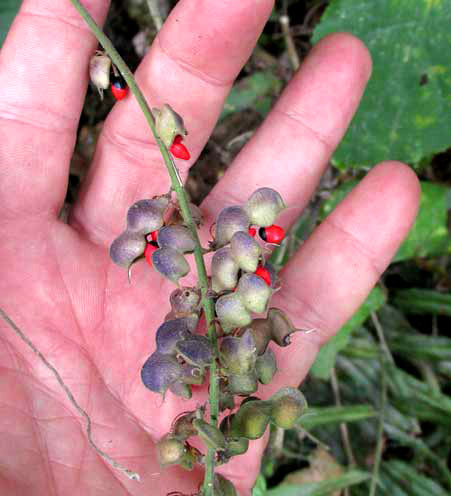
raceme of splitting , legume-type fruits

== Distribution ==
Rhynchosia precatoria occurs from the southern parts of the US states of Arizona and Florida, south through the moister parts of Mexico and possibly through Central America into Colombia in South America. The usual authorities are somewhat at odds as to how far south it occurs. Currently the iNaturalist page for the species shows documented observations stopping at about the Guatemalan border.

== Habitat ==
In the US, Rhynchosia precatoria is described as inhabiting sandy soils or limestone in open areas, thickets and forests at elevations of up to 1200m (~3900 feet). In Nicaragua, it's said to commonly occur in gallery forests and disturbed areas.

The pictures on this page are of an individual encountered at the weedy edge of a forest in very hot, humid conditions, at the end of the dry season, at about 200m in elevation (~650 feet), on Mexico's southern border with Guatemala.

== Taxonomy ==
Rhynchosia precatoria was first scientifically collected by Humboldt & Bonpland, in 1803, on the shores of the Pacific Ocean near Acapulco, Mexico --"ad littora maris Pacifici propè Acapulco," as stated in the 1824 book by Alphonse de Candolle in which the taxon was first published.

Its basionym was Glycine precatoria.

== Etymology ==
The genus name Rhynchosia is derived from the Greek rhynchos, which means "beak, or snout," alluding to the shape of the "keel" of the genus's papilionaceous flowers, like a boat's keel.

With one of this species' common names being Rosary Snoutbean, one wonders whether the species name precatoria could be based on the Latin verb precari, meaning "to pray, beg, beseech," etc., which might come to mind of someone who has seen Rhynchosia preatoria beans used as prayer beads.

== Human uses ==
Mainly the attractive red and black beans are used artisanally, as for making bracelets and necklaces.

In Mexican traditional medicine the Mayo people in northwestern Mexico have used aqueous infusions of the plant for respiratory illness and inflammations; the infusions have shown anti-inflammatory clinical results.
