= Prochola holomorpha =

Scientific classification
- Kingdom: Animalia
- Phylum: Arthropoda
- Class: Insecta
- Order: Lepidoptera
- Family: Cosmopterigidae
- Genus: Prochola
- Species: P. holomorpha

Binomial name
- Prochola holomorpha Meyrick, 1931

Species of moth

Prochola holomorpha is a moth of the family Cosmopterigidae. It is found in Paraguay.
