= Perimede erema =

Scientific classification
- Kingdom: Animalia
- Phylum: Arthropoda
- Clade: Pancrustacea
- Class: Insecta
- Order: Lepidoptera
- Family: Cosmopterigidae
- Genus: Perimede
- Species: P. erema

Binomial name
- Perimede erema Hodges, 1969

Synonyms
- Perimede eremos

Species of moth

Perimede erema is a moth in the family Cosmopterigidae. It was described by Ronald W. Hodges in 1969. It is found in North America, where it has been recorded from Arkansas and Illinois.

The wingspan is 7–8 mm. The forewings are mottled dark gray, with four black spots. The hindwings are slightly paler than the forewings. Adults have been recorded on wing in June and July.
