= Ithome lassula =

Scientific classification
- Kingdom: Animalia
- Phylum: Arthropoda
- Clade: Pancrustacea
- Class: Insecta
- Order: Lepidoptera
- Family: Cosmopterigidae
- Genus: Ithome
- Species: I. lassula

Binomial name
- Ithome lassula Hodges, 1962

Synonyms
- Eriphia lassula

Species of moth

Ithome lassula is a moth in the family Cosmopterigidae. It was described by Ronald W. Hodges in 1962. It is found in North America, where it has been recorded from Florida. It was introduced into Australia by accident, where it is now found in Queensland.

The wingspan is 6–8 mm. Adults have been recorded on wing from March to April.

The larvae feed on the flowers and buds of Leucaena glauca and Leucaena leucocephala.
