= Stilbosis chrysorrhabda =

Scientific classification
- Kingdom: Animalia
- Phylum: Arthropoda
- Class: Insecta
- Order: Lepidoptera
- Family: Cosmopterigidae
- Genus: Stilbosis
- Species: S. chrysorrhabda

Binomial name
- Stilbosis chrysorrhabda Meyrick, 1922

Species of moth

Stilbosis chrysorrhabda is a moth in the family Cosmopterigidae. It was described by Edward Meyrick in 1922. It is found in Peru.
