= Stilbosis ostryaeella =

Scientific classification
- Kingdom: Animalia
- Phylum: Arthropoda
- Clade: Pancrustacea
- Class: Insecta
- Order: Lepidoptera
- Family: Cosmopterigidae
- Genus: Stilbosis
- Species: S. ostryaeella

Binomial name
- Stilbosis ostryaeella (Chambers, 1874)

Synonyms
- Aeaea ostryaeella Chambers, 1874

Species of moth

Stilbosis ostryaeella, the ironwood leafminer moth, is a moth in the family Cosmopterigidae. It was described by Vactor Tousey Chambers in 1874. It is found in North America, where it has been recorded from Quebec, Ontario, Illinois, Maryland, Maine, Massachusetts, Kentucky, Ohio, Arkansas and Florida.

Adults have been recorded on wing from May to August.

The larvae feed on Ostrya virginiana. They mine the leaves of their host plant. The mine is created between two lateral veins. It has the form of a blotch-like mine. Full-grown larvae leave the mine and drop to the ground where pupation takes place in a silken cocoon, spun amongst litter. The species overwinters in the pupal stage.
