= Chrysopeleia purpuriella =

Scientific classification
- Kingdom: Animalia
- Phylum: Arthropoda
- Class: Insecta
- Order: Lepidoptera
- Family: Cosmopterigidae
- Genus: Chrysopeleia
- Species: C. purpuriella

Binomial name
- Chrysopeleia purpuriella Chambers, 1874

Species of moth

Chrysopeleia purpuriella is a moth that belongs to family Cosmopterigidae and to the superfamily Gelechioidea. It was described by Vactor Tousey Chambers in 1874. It is found in North America, where it has been recorded from Arkansas, Illinois, Kentucky, New York and Ohio.
