= Perimede parilis =

Scientific classification
- Kingdom: Animalia
- Phylum: Arthropoda
- Clade: Pancrustacea
- Class: Insecta
- Order: Lepidoptera
- Family: Cosmopterigidae
- Genus: Perimede
- Species: P. parilis

Binomial name
- Perimede parilis Hodges, 1969

Species of moth

Perimede parilis is a moth in the family Cosmopterigidae. It was described by Ronald W. Hodges in 1969. It is found in North America, where it has been recorded from Arkansas and Illinois.

The wingspan is 8–12 mm. Adults are dark gray black. The forewings have a yellowish-white patch in the costal scales just before the apex. There are a few whitish scales on the apical one-fifth of wing and an incomplete V shape of whitish scales connecting white spots at three-fourths the length of the wing. Adults have been recorded on wing from June to August.
