= Stilbosis victor =

Scientific classification
- Kingdom: Animalia
- Phylum: Arthropoda
- Clade: Pancrustacea
- Class: Insecta
- Order: Lepidoptera
- Family: Cosmopterigidae
- Genus: Stilbosis
- Species: S. victor

Binomial name
- Stilbosis victor (Hodges, 1964)

Synonyms
- Aeaea victor Hodges, 1964

Species of moth

Stilbosis victor is a moth in the family Cosmopterigidae. It was described by Ronald W. Hodges in 1964. It is found in North America, where it has been recorded from Illinois, Indiana, Ohio, New Jersey, Virginia and Arkansas.

The wingspan is about 8 mm. Adults have been recorded on wing from May to June.
