= Perimede purpurescens =

Scientific classification
- Kingdom: Animalia
- Phylum: Arthropoda
- Clade: Pancrustacea
- Class: Insecta
- Order: Lepidoptera
- Family: Cosmopterigidae
- Genus: Perimede
- Species: P. purpurescens

Binomial name
- Perimede purpurescens Forbes, 1931

Synonyms
- Mompha purpurescens

Species of moth

Perimede purpurescens is a moth in the family Cosmopterigidae. It was described by William Trowbridge Merrifield Forbes in 1931. It is found in Puerto Rico and Cuba.
