= Perimede annulata =

Scientific classification
- Domain: Eukaryota
- Kingdom: Animalia
- Phylum: Arthropoda
- Class: Insecta
- Order: Lepidoptera
- Family: Cosmopterigidae
- Genus: Perimede
- Species: P. annulata

Binomial name
- Perimede annulata Busck, 1914

Synonyms
- Mompha annulata Busck, 1914

Species of moth

Perimede annulata is a moth in the family Cosmopterigidae. It was described by August Busck in 1914. It is found in Panama.
