= Stilbosis venifica =

Scientific classification
- Kingdom: Animalia
- Phylum: Arthropoda
- Clade: Pancrustacea
- Class: Insecta
- Order: Lepidoptera
- Family: Cosmopterigidae
- Genus: Stilbosis
- Species: S. venifica

Binomial name
- Stilbosis venifica (Hodges, 1964)

Synonyms
- Aeaea venifica Hodges, 1964

Species of moth

Stilbosis venifica is a moth in the family Cosmopterigidae. It was described by Ronald W. Hodges in 1964. It is found in North America, where it has been recorded from Maryland, Arkansas, West Virginia and Illinois.
