= Stilbosis lonchocarpella =

Scientific classification
- Domain: Eukaryota
- Kingdom: Animalia
- Phylum: Arthropoda
- Class: Insecta
- Order: Lepidoptera
- Family: Cosmopterigidae
- Genus: Stilbosis
- Species: S. lonchocarpella

Binomial name
- Stilbosis lonchocarpella Busck, 1934

Species of moth

Stilbosis lonchocarpella is a moth in the family Cosmopterigidae. It was described by August Busck in 1934. It is found in Cuba and mainland North America, where it has been recorded from Florida.

The wingspan is about 8 mm. Adults have been recorded on wing from December to April.

Larvae have been recorded feeding on Lonchocarpus sericeus.
