= Chrysopeleia (moth) =

Scientific classification
- Domain: Eukaryota
- Kingdom: Animalia
- Phylum: Arthropoda
- Class: Insecta
- Order: Lepidoptera
- Family: Cosmopterigidae
- Subfamily: Chrysopeleiinae
- Genus: Chrysopeleia; Chambers, 1874

Synonyms
- Clemmatista Meyrick, 1921

Genus of moths

Chrysopeleia is a genus of moths in the family Cosmopterigidae. The genus was erected by Vactor Tousey Chambers in 1874.

== Species ==
- Chrysopeleia purpuriella Chambers, 1874
- Chrysopeleia quadricristatela Chambers, 1880
