= Stilbosis tesquella =

Scientific classification
- Kingdom: Animalia
- Phylum: Arthropoda
- Clade: Pancrustacea
- Class: Insecta
- Order: Lepidoptera
- Family: Cosmopterigidae
- Genus: Stilbosis
- Species: S. tesquella

Binomial name
- Stilbosis tesquella Clemens, 1860

Synonyms
- Laverna quinquicristatella Chambers, 1881

Species of moth

Stilbosis tesquella is a moth in the family Cosmopterigidae. It was described by James Brackenridge Clemens in 1860. It is found in North America, where it has been recorded from Arkansas, Colorado, Illinois, Indiana, Iowa, Kansas, Kentucky, Maine, Maryland, Michigan, Minnesota, New Jersey, New York, North Carolina, Ohio, Quebec, Tennessee and West Virginia.

The wingspan is 4–6 mm. Adults have been recorded on wing from May to September.

The larvae feed on Amphicarpa bracteata and Lespedeza species.
