= Stilbosis dulcedo =

Scientific classification
- Kingdom: Animalia
- Phylum: Arthropoda
- Clade: Pancrustacea
- Class: Insecta
- Order: Lepidoptera
- Family: Cosmopterigidae
- Genus: Stilbosis
- Species: S. dulcedo

Binomial name
- Stilbosis dulcedo (Hodges, 1964)

Synonyms
- Aeaea dulcedo Hodges, 1964

Species of moth

Stilbosis dulcedo is a moth in the family Cosmopterigidae. It was described by Ronald W. Hodges in 1964. It is found in North America, where it has been recorded from California and Arizona.

Adults have been recorded on wing from February to June.

The larvae feed on Quercus agrifolia, Quercus chrysolepis and Quercus wislizenii.
