= Eumenodora tetrachorda =

Scientific classification
- Kingdom: Animalia
- Phylum: Arthropoda
- Class: Insecta
- Order: Lepidoptera
- Family: Xyloryctidae
- Genus: Eumenodora
- Species: E. tetrachorda

Binomial name
- Eumenodora tetrachorda Meyrick, 1924

Species of moth

Eumenodora encrypta is a moth in the family Xyloryctidae. It was described by Edward Meyrick in 1906. It is found in India.

The wingspan is about 7 mm. The forewings are ochreous brownish with four narrow obscure suffused whitish longitudinal streaks (subcostal, discal, plical, and dorsal) from the base to about three-fourths, irrorated (sprinkled) with grey more strongly posteriorly. Beyond these is a similar acutely angulated transverse line at five-sixths marked with an extremely fine dash or group of blackish-grey scales in the disc, and streaks on the apical part of the costa and termen. There are some blackish-grey scales on the fold towards the tornus. The hindwings are grey whitish in males, with a thin expansible pencil of very fine whitish hairs from the base of the costa. The female hindwings are light grey.

The larvae feed on the needles of Casuarina species.
