= Prochola oppidana =

Scientific classification
- Kingdom: Animalia
- Phylum: Arthropoda
- Class: Insecta
- Order: Lepidoptera
- Family: Cosmopterigidae
- Genus: Prochola
- Species: P. oppidana

Binomial name
- Prochola oppidana Meyrick, 1915

Species of moth

Prochola oppidana is a moth of the family Cosmopterigidae. It is found in Guyana.
