= Stilbosis schmitzi =

Scientific classification
- Kingdom: Animalia
- Phylum: Arthropoda
- Clade: Pancrustacea
- Class: Insecta
- Order: Lepidoptera
- Family: Cosmopterigidae
- Genus: Stilbosis
- Species: S. schmitzi

Binomial name
- Stilbosis schmitzi B. Landry, 2008

Species of moth

Stilbosis schmitzi is a moth in the family Cosmopterigidae. It was described by Bernard Landry in 2008. It is found on the Galápagos Islands.
