= Stilbosis venatrix =

Scientific classification
- Domain: Eukaryota
- Kingdom: Animalia
- Phylum: Arthropoda
- Class: Insecta
- Order: Lepidoptera
- Family: Cosmopterigidae
- Genus: Stilbosis
- Species: S. venatrix

Binomial name
- Stilbosis venatrix (Hodges, 1964)

Synonyms
- Aeaea venatrix Hodges, 1964

Species of moth

Stilbosis venatrix is a moth in the family Cosmopterigidae. It was described by Ronald W. Hodges in 1964. It is found in North America, where it has been recorded from Arizona.
