= Ithome volcanica =

Scientific classification
- Kingdom: Animalia
- Phylum: Arthropoda
- Clade: Pancrustacea
- Class: Insecta
- Order: Lepidoptera
- Family: Cosmopterigidae
- Genus: Ithome
- Species: I. volcanica

Binomial name
- Ithome volcanica Landry, 2001

Species of moth

Ithome volcanica is a moth in the family Cosmopterigidae. It was described by Bernard Landry in 2001. It is found on the Galápagos Islands.
