= Stilbosis juvenis =

Scientific classification
- Domain: Eukaryota
- Kingdom: Animalia
- Phylum: Arthropoda
- Class: Insecta
- Order: Lepidoptera
- Family: Cosmopterigidae
- Genus: Stilbosis
- Species: S. juvenis

Binomial name
- Stilbosis juvenis Walsingham, 1909

Species of moth

Stilbosis juvenis is a moth in the family Cosmopterigidae. It was described by Thomas de Grey, 6th Baron Walsingham, in 1909. It is found in Mexico.
