= Perimede ricina =

Scientific classification
- Kingdom: Animalia
- Phylum: Arthropoda
- Clade: Pancrustacea
- Class: Insecta
- Order: Lepidoptera
- Family: Cosmopterigidae
- Genus: Perimede
- Species: P. ricina

Binomial name
- Perimede ricina Hodges, 1962

Species of moth

Perimede ricina is a moth in the family Cosmopterigidae. It was described by Ronald W. Hodges in 1962. It is found in North America, where it has been recorded from Illinois, Indiana, Kentucky, Louisiana, Maryland, Massachusetts, New Jersey, New York, Pennsylvania, Tennessee, West Virginia and Wisconsin.

The wingspan is 12–15 mm. Adults have been recorded on wing from April to September and in November.
