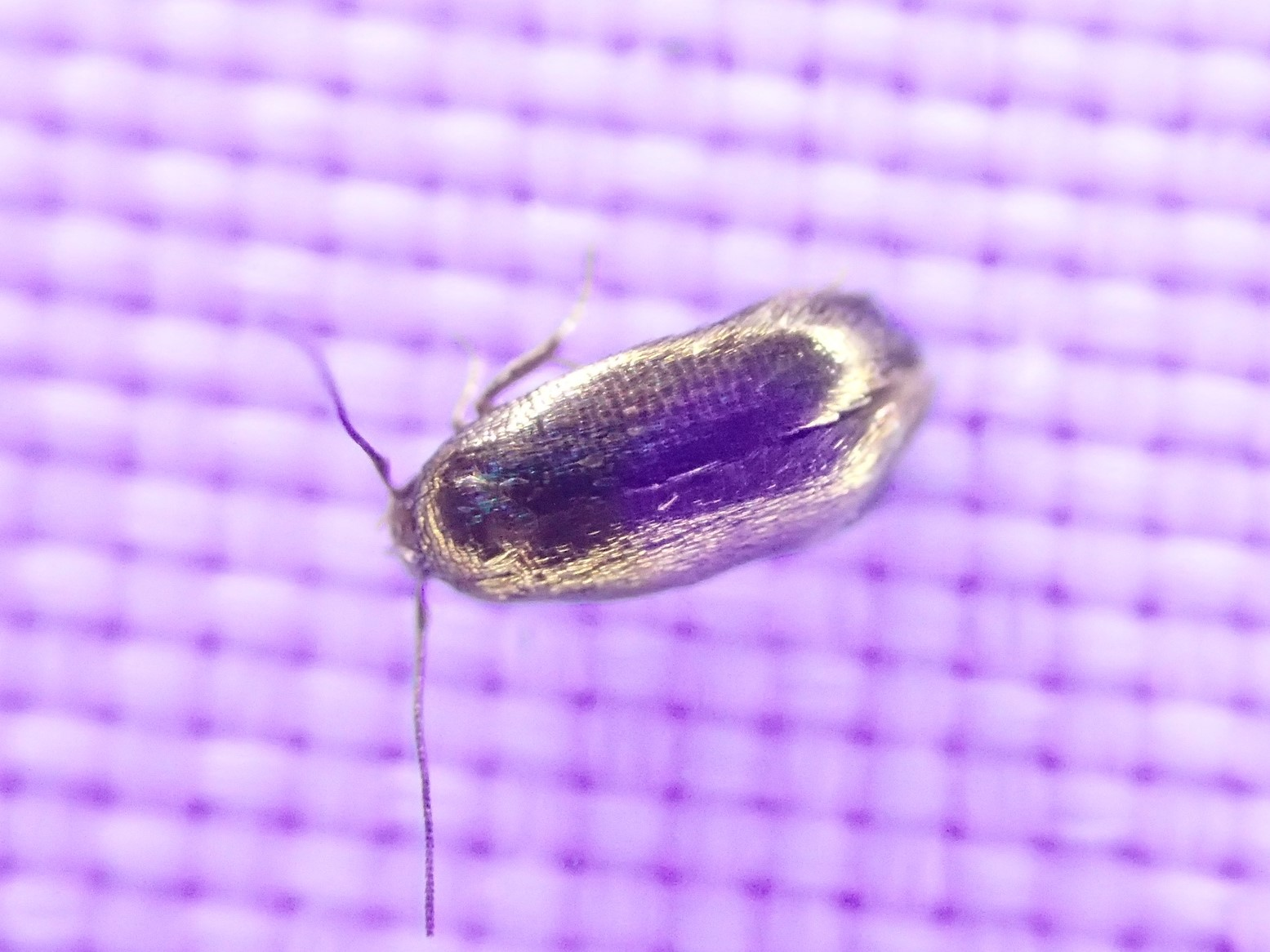

Scientific classification
- Kingdom: Animalia
- Phylum: Arthropoda
- Clade: Pancrustacea
- Class: Insecta
- Order: Lepidoptera
- Family: Cosmopterigidae
- Subfamily: Chrysopeleiinae
- Genus: Siskiwitia; Hodges, 1969

= Siskiwitia =

Genus of moths

Siskiwitia is a genus of moths in the family Cosmopterigidae.

== Species ==
- Siskiwitia alticolans Hodges, 1969
- Siskiwitia falcata Hodges, 1978
- Siskiwitia latebra Hodges, 1978
