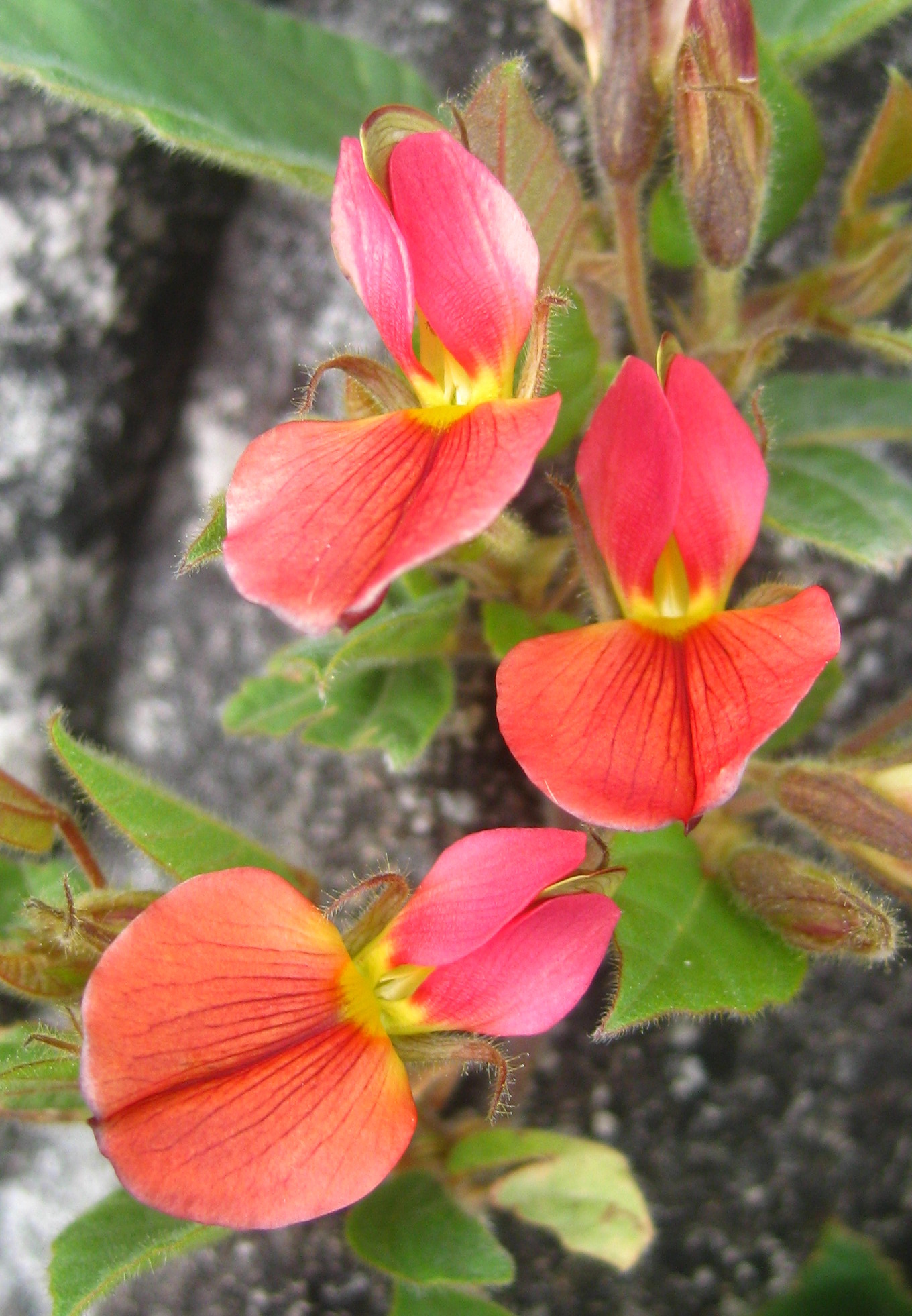
- Rhynchosia monophylla

Scientific classification
- Kingdom: Plantae
- Clade: Tracheophytes
- Clade: Angiosperms
- Clade: Eudicots
- Clade: Rosids
- Order: Fabales
- Family: Fabaceae
- Subfamily: Faboideae
- Clade: Millettioids
- Tribe: Phaseoleae
- Subtribe: Cajaninae
- Genus: Rhynchosia; Lour.

Species
- 260; see text

Synonyms
- Arcyphyllum Elliott (1818); Austerium Poit. ex DC. (1825); Baukea Vatke (1881); Chrysoscias E.Mey. (1836); Copisma E.Mey. (1836); Cyanospermum Wight & Arn. (1834); Cylista Aiton (1789); Dolicholus Medik. (1787); Hidrosia E.Mey. (1836); Leucopterum Small (1933); Leycephyllum Piper (1924); Nomismia Wight & Arn. (1834); Orthodanum E.Mey. (1836); Pitcheria Nutt.(1834); Polytropia C.Presl (1831); Sigmodostyles Meisn. (1843)

= Rhynchosia =

Genus of legumes

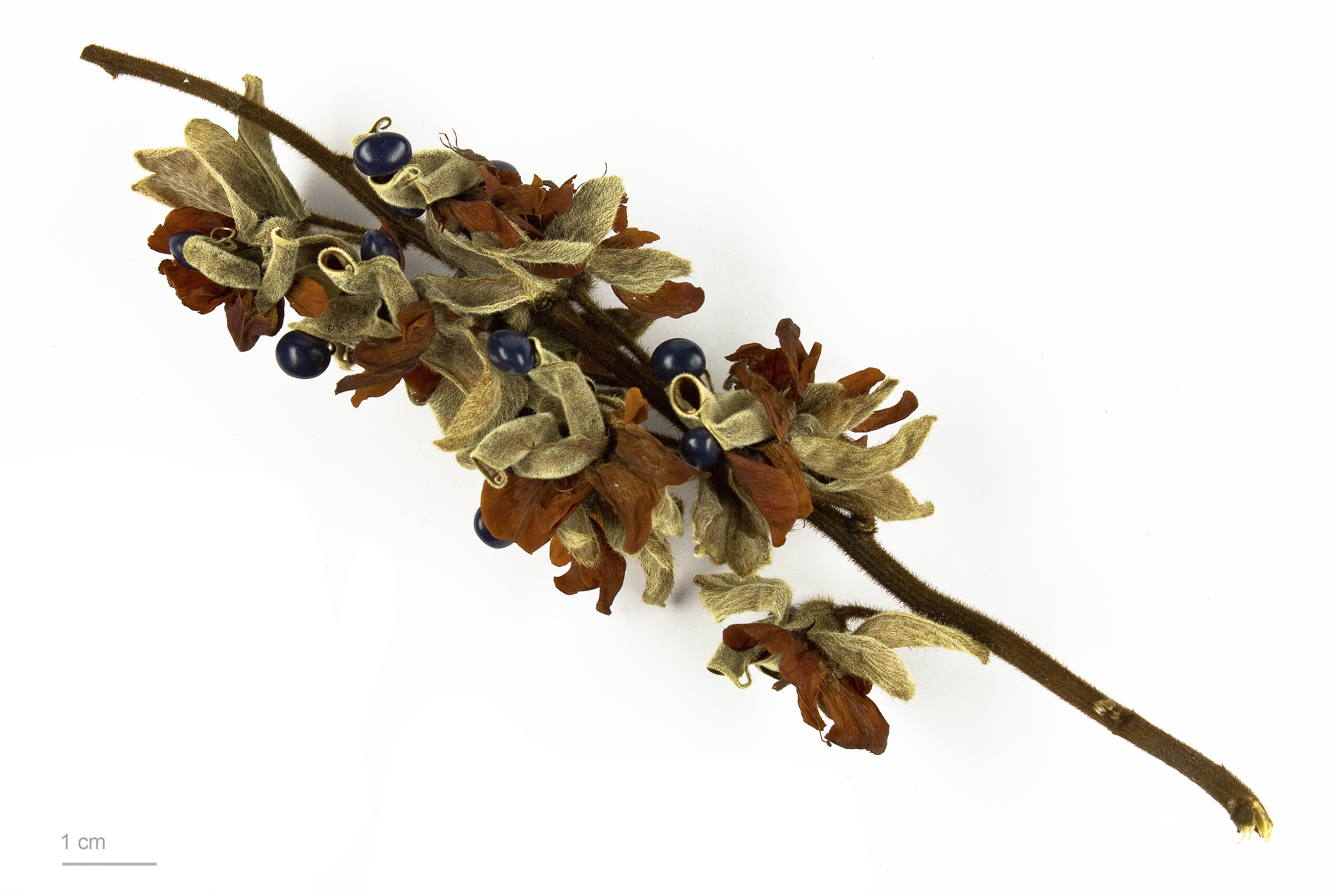
Rhynchosia hirta - MHNT

Rhynchosia, also known as snoutbean, is a genus of plants in the family Fabaceae. It includes 260 species of herbs, vines, and subshrubs native to tropical, subtropical, and warm temperate regions around the world, ranging from the southern United States to northern Argentina in the Americas, and through Africa, the Arabian Peninsula, southern Asia from Iran to Korea and Japan, New Guinea, and Australia. Typical habitats include seasonally-dry forest, forest margins, woodland, thicket, wooded grassland, shrubland, and grassland, often in open rocky areas, disturbed areas, or along streams. Many species are pyrophytes. There are several different complexes within the genus, including the Senna complex.

== Species ==
260 species are accepted. Species include:

- Rhynchosia americana
- Rhynchosia calosperma
- Rhynchosia caribaea
- Rhynchosia chapmanii
- Rhynchosia chimanimaniensis
- Rhynchosia cinerea
- Rhynchosia cytisoides
- Rhynchosia densiflora
- Rhynchosia difformis
- Rhynchosia edulis
- Rhynchosia latifolia
- Rhynchosia lewtonii
- Rhynchosia malacophylla
- Rhynchosia michauxii
- Rhynchosia minima
- Rhynchosia parvifolia
- Rhynchosia phaseoloides
- Rhynchosia precatoria
- Rhynchosia reniformis
- Rhynchosia reticulata
- Rhynchosia senna - Texas snoutbean
- Rhynchosia stipitata
- Rhynchosia sublobata
- Rhynchosia swartzii
- Rhynchosia tomentosa
- Rhynchosia totta
- Rhynchosia viscosa (Roth) DC.
- Rhynchosia volubilis
- Rhynchosia wildii

== Legal status ==
=== United States ===
==== Louisiana ====
Except for ornamental purposes, growing, selling or possessing Rhynchosia spp. is prohibited by Louisiana State Act 159.
