= Perimede catapasta =

Scientific classification
- Domain: Eukaryota
- Kingdom: Animalia
- Phylum: Arthropoda
- Class: Insecta
- Order: Lepidoptera
- Family: Cosmopterigidae
- Genus: Perimede
- Species: P. catapasta

Binomial name
- Perimede catapasta Walsingham, 1909

Synonyms
- Mompha catapasta Walsingham, 1909

Species of moth

Perimede catapasta is a moth in the family Cosmopterigidae. It was described by Thomas de Grey, 6th Baron Walsingham, in 1909. It is found in Mexico.
