= Prochola sancticola =

Scientific classification
- Kingdom: Animalia
- Phylum: Arthropoda
- Class: Insecta
- Order: Lepidoptera
- Family: Cosmopterigidae
- Genus: Prochola
- Species: P. sancticola

Binomial name
- Prochola sancticola Meyrick, 1932

Species of moth

Prochola sancticola is a moth of the family Cosmopterigidae. It is found on the Virgin Islands.
