= Ithome edax =

Scientific classification
- Kingdom: Animalia
- Phylum: Arthropoda
- Clade: Pancrustacea
- Class: Insecta
- Order: Lepidoptera
- Family: Cosmopterigidae
- Genus: Ithome
- Species: I. edax

Binomial name
- Ithome edax Hodges, 1962

Species of moth

Ithome edax is a moth in the family Cosmopterigidae. It was described by Ronald W. Hodges in 1962. It is found in North America, where it has been recorded from Texas.

The wingspan is 6–7 mm.

The larvae feed on the blossoms of Pithecellobium flexicaule.
