= Stilbosis extensa =

Scientific classification
- Domain: Eukaryota
- Kingdom: Animalia
- Phylum: Arthropoda
- Class: Insecta
- Order: Lepidoptera
- Family: Cosmopterigidae
- Genus: Stilbosis
- Species: S. extensa

Binomial name
- Stilbosis extensa (Braun, 1919)

Synonyms
- Amaurogramma extensa Braun, 1919; Aeaea extensa

Species of moth

Stilbosis extensa is a moth in the family Cosmopterigidae. It was described by Annette Frances Braun in 1919. It is found in North America where it has been recorded from California.

The wingspan is 7.5–9 mm. The head, thorax and forewings are clothed with whitish-tipped gray scales. There are four patches of blackish raised scales on the forewings, each margined inwardly with dull whitish. The hindwings are gray.
