= Afeda =

Scientific classification
- Kingdom: Animalia
- Phylum: Arthropoda
- Clade: Pancrustacea
- Class: Insecta
- Order: Lepidoptera
- Family: Cosmopterigidae
- Subfamily: Chrysopeleiinae
- Genus: Afeda; Hodges, 1978
- Species: A. biloba

Binomial name
- Afeda biloba Hodges, 1978

Genus of moths

Afeda is a genus of moth in the family Cosmopterigidae. It consists of only one species, Afeda biloba, which is found in Florida.
