= Eumenodora encrypta =

Scientific classification
- Kingdom: Animalia
- Phylum: Arthropoda
- Class: Insecta
- Order: Lepidoptera
- Family: Xyloryctidae
- Genus: Eumenodora
- Species: E. encrypta

Binomial name
- Eumenodora encrypta Meyrick, 1906

Species of moth

Eumenodora encrypta is a moth in the family Xyloryctidae. It was described by Edward Meyrick in 1906. It is found in Australia, where it has been recorded from the Australian Capital Territory, Queensland and South Australia.

Its wingspan is 6.5-7.5 mm and its forewings are pale dark grey with a faint bronzy sheen and an indistinct, dark spot in the middle of wing at fold.
