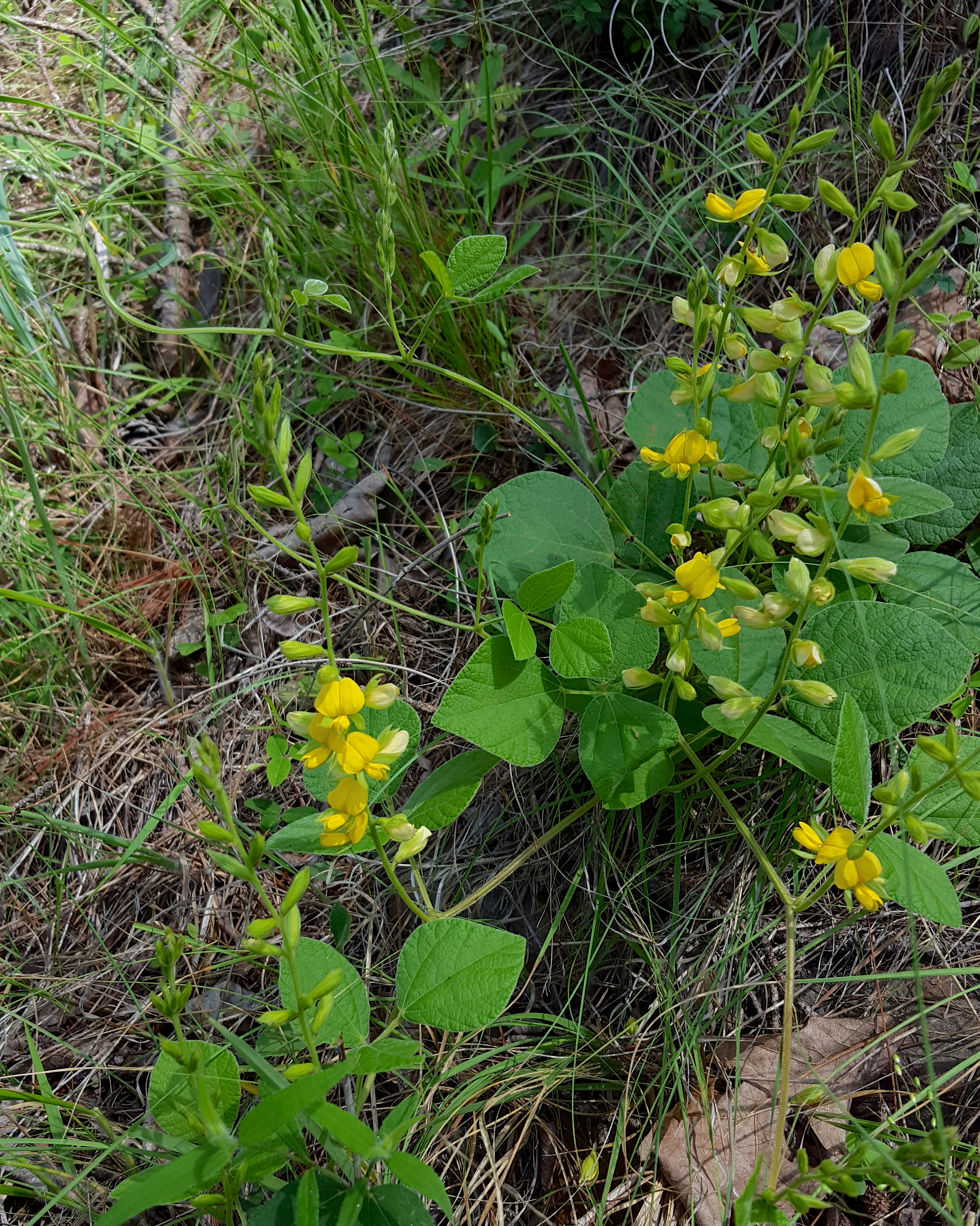

Scientific classification
- Kingdom: Plantae
- Clade: Tracheophytes
- Clade: Angiosperms
- Clade: Eudicots
- Clade: Rosids
- Order: Fabales
- Family: Fabaceae
- Subfamily: Faboideae
- Genus: Rhynchosia
- Species: R. latifolia

Binomial name
- Rhynchosia latifolia (Michx.) Britton, Sterns & Poggenb.

= Rhynchosia latifolia =

Species of legume

Rhynchosia latifolia, commonly called prairie snoutbean, is a species of plant in the legume family that is native to south-central United States.

It is a perennial that produces yellow flowers in the summer.
