= Ithome pelasta =

Scientific classification
- Kingdom: Animalia
- Phylum: Arthropoda
- Class: Insecta
- Order: Lepidoptera
- Family: Cosmopterigidae
- Genus: Ithome
- Species: I. pelasta

Binomial name
- Ithome pelasta (Meyrick, 1915)

Synonyms
- Cholotis pelasta Meyrick, 1915

Species of moth

Ithome pelasta is a moth in the family Cosmopterigidae. It was described by Edward Meyrick in 1915. It is found in Guyana.
