= Perimede maniola =

Scientific classification
- Kingdom: Animalia
- Phylum: Arthropoda
- Clade: Pancrustacea
- Class: Insecta
- Order: Lepidoptera
- Family: Cosmopterigidae
- Genus: Perimede
- Species: P. maniola

Binomial name
- Perimede maniola Hodges, 1969

Species of moth

Perimede maniola is a moth in the family Cosmopterigidae. It was described by Ronald W. Hodges in 1969. It is found in North America, where it has been recorded from Illinois.

The wingspan is 9-10.5 mm. The forewings are dark gray brown with four indistinct dark spots, followed and preceded by off-white scales. The hindwings are pale to medium gray. Adults have been recorded on wing in July and August.
