= Stilbosis rotunda =

Scientific classification
- Kingdom: Animalia
- Phylum: Arthropoda
- Clade: Pancrustacea
- Class: Insecta
- Order: Lepidoptera
- Family: Cosmopterigidae
- Genus: Stilbosis
- Species: S. rotunda

Binomial name
- Stilbosis rotunda Hodges, 1978

Species of moth

Stilbosis rotunda is a moth in the family Cosmopterigidae. It was described by Ronald W. Hodges in 1978. It is found in North America, where it has been recorded from Arizona.
