= Ithome pignerata =

Scientific classification
- Kingdom: Animalia
- Phylum: Arthropoda
- Class: Insecta
- Order: Lepidoptera
- Family: Cosmopterigidae
- Genus: Ithome
- Species: I. pignerata

Binomial name
- Ithome pignerata (Meyrick, 1922)

Synonyms
- Ascalenia pignerata Meyrick, 1922

Species of moth

Ithome pignerata is a moth in the family Cosmopterigidae. It was described by Edward Meyrick in 1922. It is found in Brazil.
