= Ithome concolorella =

Scientific classification
- Kingdom: Animalia
- Phylum: Arthropoda
- Clade: Pancrustacea
- Class: Insecta
- Order: Lepidoptera
- Family: Cosmopterigidae
- Genus: Ithome
- Species: I. concolorella

Binomial name
- Ithome concolorella (Chambers, 1875)

Synonyms
- Eriphia concolorella Chambers, 1875; Ithome unimaculella Chambers, 1875; Ithome unomaculella

Species of moth

Ithome concolorella, the kiawe flower moth, is a species of moth of the family Cosmopterigidae. It was first described by Vactor Tousey Chambers in 1875. It is found in the southern United States, including Texas, southern Arizona and Florida. It is an introduced species in Hawaii, where it has been recorded from Kauai, Oahu, Maui, Hawaii and Molokai as well as Ascension Island.

The wingspan is about 8 mm.

The larvae are a pest of the flowers of Prosopis chilensis and Acacia farnesiana in Hawaii.

== Life history ==
The egg is inserted into the flower. Usually a light brown spot develops on the external surface of the bud at the site of oviposition. The eggs hatch in three to five days. The larvae has a brown head and the remainder of the body is white to pale yellow. The first-instar larva usually feeds on the pistil, then on the stamens. It remains in the bud in which the egg was laid throughout the first instar. The second-instar larva also usually remains in the initial bud but it may bore into an adjacent bud. Subsequently, as the larva develops, it bores into other florets, eating the inner parts of them. The damaged florets are joined near the entrance holes. Often as many as 15 florets are joined in a row, forming a tunnel in which a fully grown larva may be found.

The larva spins a silken cocoon within which it pupates. The pupa is almost white at first, turning brown soon after, and almost black when the adult is ready to emerge. When the larva is ready to pupate it probably comes out of the florets and drops to the ground to pupate.

The adult moth is usually nocturnal.
