= Stilbosis antibathra =

Scientific classification
- Kingdom: Animalia
- Phylum: Arthropoda
- Class: Insecta
- Order: Lepidoptera
- Family: Cosmopterigidae
- Genus: Stilbosis
- Species: S. antibathra

Binomial name
- Stilbosis antibathra (Meyrick, 1914)

Synonyms
- Mompha antibathra Meyrick, 1914

Species of moth

Stilbosis antibathra is a moth in the family Cosmopterigidae. It was described by Edward Meyrick in 1914. It is found in Pretoria, South Africa.

This species has a wingspan of 11–13 mm. The forewings are dark fuscous with a broad, pale, ochreous fascia near the base.
