= Pristen (moth) =

Scientific classification
- Kingdom: Animalia
- Phylum: Arthropoda
- Class: Insecta
- Order: Lepidoptera
- Family: Cosmopterigidae
- Subfamily: Chrysopeleiinae
- Genus: Pristen; Hodges, 1978
- Species: P. corusca

Binomial name
- Pristen corusca (Hodges, 1964)

Synonyms
- Neoploca Hodges, 1964 (preocc. Matsumura, 1927); Neoploca corusca Hodges, 1964

Genus of moths

Pristen is a genus of moth in the family Cosmopterigidae. It contains only one species, Pristen corusca, which is found in North America, where it has been recorded from Arizona.
