= Obithome =

Scientific classification
- Kingdom: Animalia
- Phylum: Arthropoda
- Clade: Pancrustacea
- Class: Insecta
- Order: Lepidoptera
- Family: Cosmopterigidae
- Subfamily: Chrysopeleiinae
- Genus: Obithome; Hodges, 1964
- Species: O. punctiferella

Binomial name
- Obithome punctiferella (Busck, 1906)

Synonyms
- Mompha punctiferella Busck, 1906

Genus of moths

Obithome is a genus of moth in the family Cosmopterigidae. It contains only one species, Obithome punctiferella, which is found in North America, where it has been recorded from Texas.

The wingspan is 10–11 mm. The forewings are dark silvery grey, evenly speckled with numerous minute tufts of black scales. The hindwings are dark fuscous. Adults have been recorded on wing in January.
