= Perimede citeriella =

Scientific classification
- Kingdom: Animalia
- Phylum: Arthropoda
- Clade: Pancrustacea
- Class: Insecta
- Order: Lepidoptera
- Family: Cosmopterigidae
- Genus: Perimede
- Species: P. citeriella

Binomial name
- Perimede citeriella Sinev, 1986

Synonyms
- Mompha citeriella Sinev, 1986

Species of moth

Perimede citeriella is a moth in the family Cosmopterigidae. It was described by Sinev in 1986. It is found in Russia.
