= Stilbosis quadricustatella =

Scientific classification
- Kingdom: Animalia
- Phylum: Arthropoda
- Clade: Pancrustacea
- Class: Insecta
- Order: Lepidoptera
- Family: Cosmopterigidae
- Genus: Stilbosis
- Species: S. quadricustatella

Binomial name
- Stilbosis quadricustatella (Chambers, 1880)

Synonyms
- Aeaea quadricustatella Chambers, 1880; Aeaea quadricristatella; Chrysopeleia quadricristatella

Species of moth

Stilbosis quadricustatella is a moth in the family Cosmopterigidae. It is found in North America, where it has been recorded from Arkansas, Florida, Illinois, Mississippi and Texas.
