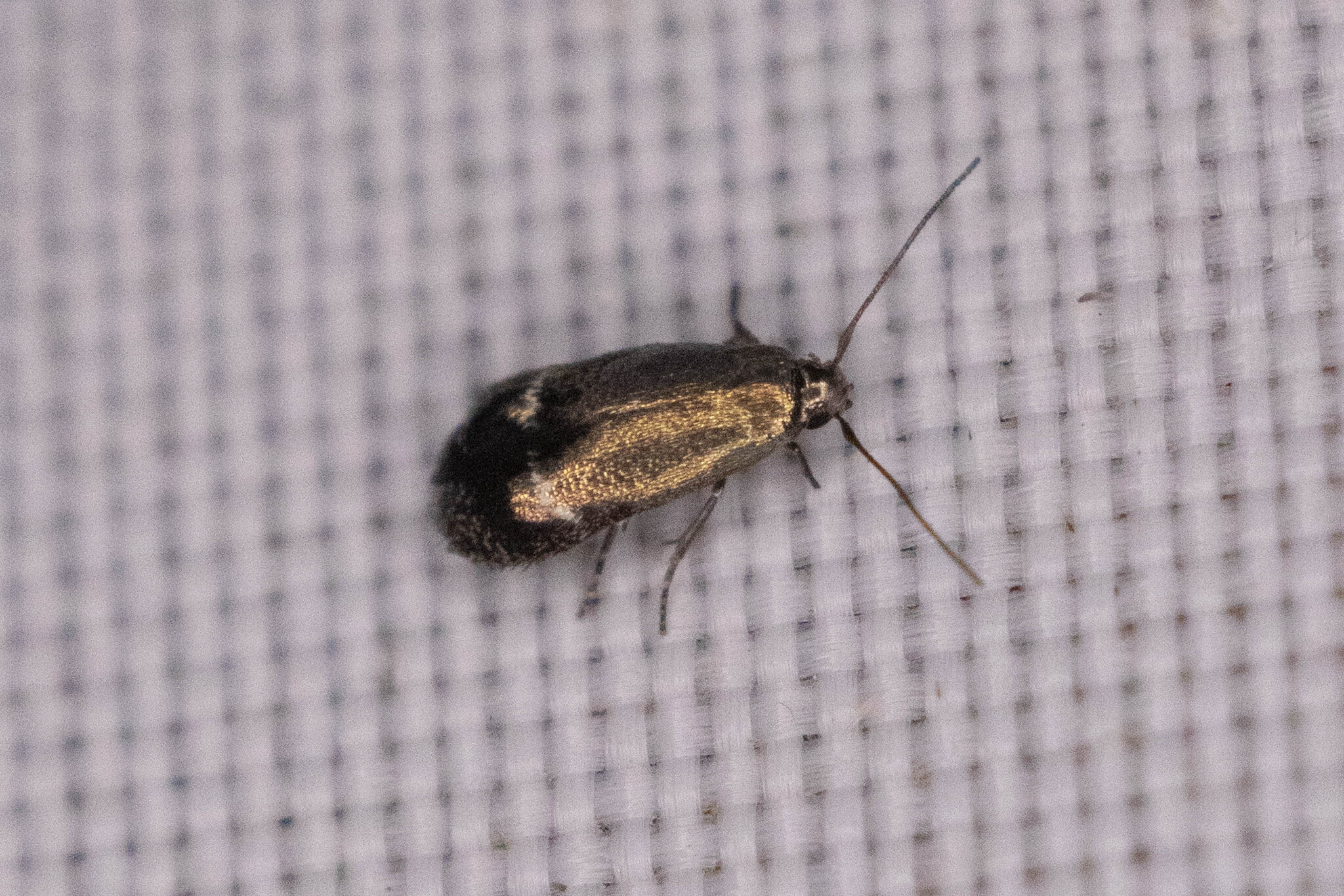

Scientific classification
- Kingdom: Animalia
- Phylum: Arthropoda
- Clade: Pancrustacea
- Class: Insecta
- Order: Lepidoptera
- Family: Cosmopterigidae
- Genus: Siskiwitia
- Species: S. alticolans

Binomial name
- Siskiwitia alticolans Hodges, 1969

= Siskiwitia alticolans =

Species of moth

Siskiwitia alticolans is a species of moth in the family Cosmopterigidae. It was first described by Ronald W. Hodges in 1969. It is found in North America, where it has been recorded from Arizona and Texas.

== Description ==
The wingspan is about 6 mm (0.24 in). The thorax and forewings are black with a transverse, white band at two-thirds length of the wing. The hindwings are shining dark gray. Adults have been recorded on wing in July and August.
