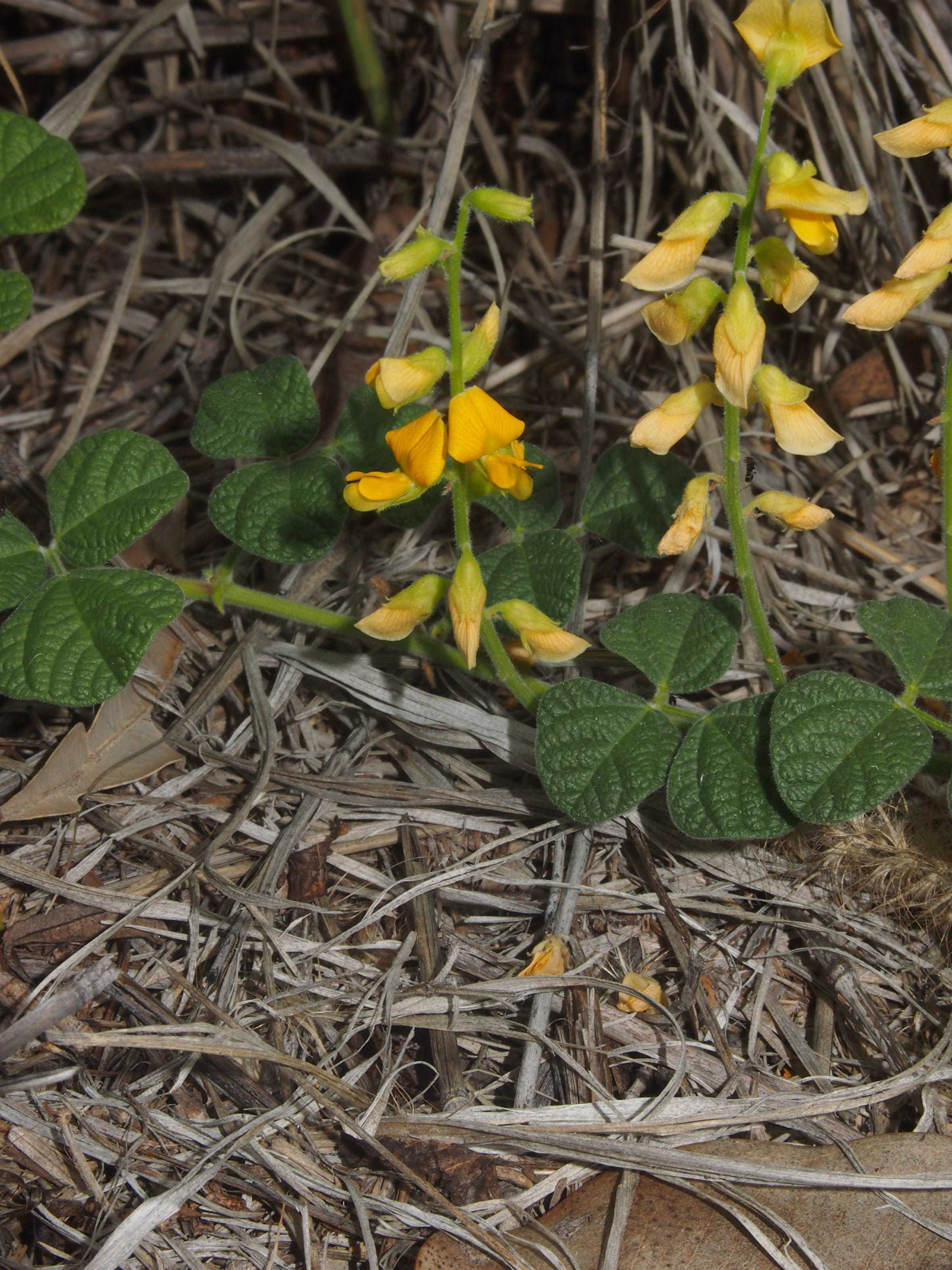

Scientific classification
- Kingdom: Plantae
- Clade: Tracheophytes
- Clade: Angiosperms
- Clade: Eudicots
- Clade: Rosids
- Order: Fabales
- Family: Fabaceae
- Subfamily: Faboideae
- Genus: Rhynchosia
- Species: R. minima

Binomial name
- Rhynchosia minima (L.) DC.

= Rhynchosia minima =

Species of legume

Rhynchosia minima is a species of flowering plant in the legume family known by the common names least snout-bean, burn-mouth-vine, and jumby-bean. It can be found on every continent. It is naturalized in Hawaii.

This perennial herb has twining or trailing stems which can reach 1.2 meters in length. The leaves are made up of three leaflets measuring up to 3 to 3.5 centimeters long. The inflorescence is a raceme of up to 15 flowers. The flowers are yellow with purple or brown veining and measure up to 8 millimeters long. The fruit is one or two centimeters long.

This common plant is used as animal forage.
