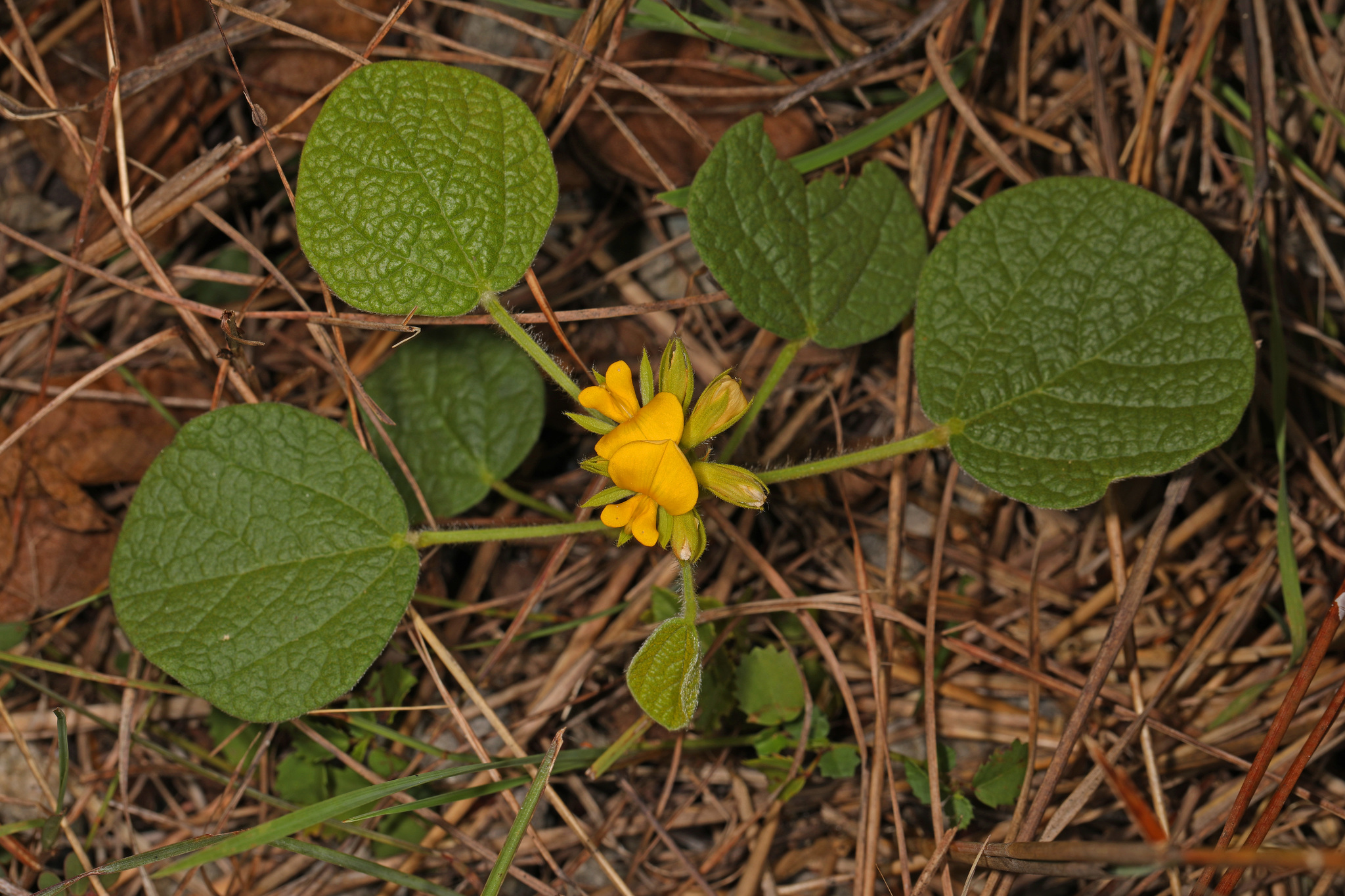

Scientific classification
- Kingdom: Plantae
- Clade: Embryophytes
- Clade: Tracheophytes
- Clade: Spermatophytes
- Clade: Angiosperms
- Clade: Eudicots
- Clade: Rosids
- Order: Fabales
- Family: Fabaceae
- Subfamily: Faboideae
- Genus: Rhynchosia
- Species: R. reniformis

Binomial name
- Rhynchosia reniformis A.DC.

= Rhynchosia reniformis =

Species of plant

Rhynchosia reniformis, commonly known as dollarweed or dollarweed snoutbean, is an herbaceous perennial vine endemic to the southeastern United States.

== Description ==
Rhynchosia reniformis grows erect, trails, or climbs, reaching 5–25 cm in height. The stems are strongly angled and densely covered with short hairs. Leaves are mostly made up of a single leaflet, though the lowest may have three. Leaflets are round to kidney-shaped, thick, and often wider than long, with visible veins, soft hairs, and scattered tiny amber-colored glands. Stipules at the base of the leaves are narrow and persistent. Flowers are small, yellow, and pea-like, arranged in clusters in the leaf axils or sometimes at the ends of branches. Each flower sits on a short stalk and is subtended by a narrow bract that falls off early. The calyx is hairy with five pointed lobes, and the petals are usually about the same length or slightly shorter than the calyx. The fruit is a flat, oblong pod, 1–1.8 cm long, covered in short hairs and containing one or two seeds.

The root system has stem tubers which store non-structural carbohydrates, helping the plant resprout following fire and persist during periods of fire exclusion.

== Distribution and habitat ==
Rhynchosia reniformis is distributed from southeastern North Carolina south to South Florida and west to East Texas. It grows in longleaf pine sandhills and pine rocklands. It has been shown to regrow in longleaf pine communities that were disturbed by agriculture in South Carolina, potentially making it an indicator species for post-agricultural woodlands. However, it has shown resistance to regrowth in reestablished pine forests that were previously disturbed by military training.

== Ecology ==
It flowers from June through September and fruits from August to October. The seeds are a food source for small mammals, songbirds, and northern bobwhite, and white-tail deer forage on the plant.
