= Prochola catacentra =

Scientific classification
- Kingdom: Animalia
- Phylum: Arthropoda
- Class: Insecta
- Order: Lepidoptera
- Family: Cosmopterigidae
- Genus: Prochola
- Species: P. catacentra

Binomial name
- Prochola catacentra Meyrick, 1922

Species of moth

Prochola catacentra is a moth of the family Cosmopterigidae. It is found in Brazil.
