= Stilbosis risor =

Scientific classification
- Kingdom: Animalia
- Phylum: Arthropoda
- Clade: Pancrustacea
- Class: Insecta
- Order: Lepidoptera
- Family: Cosmopterigidae
- Genus: Stilbosis
- Species: S. risor

Binomial name
- Stilbosis risor (Hodges, 1964)

Synonyms
- Aeaea risor Hodges, 1964

Species of moth

Stilbosis risor is a moth in the family Cosmopterigidae. It was described by Ronald W. Hodges in 1964. It is found in North America, where it has been recorded from Arizona.
