= Stilbosis nubila =

Scientific classification
- Kingdom: Animalia
- Phylum: Arthropoda
- Clade: Pancrustacea
- Class: Insecta
- Order: Lepidoptera
- Family: Cosmopterigidae
- Genus: Stilbosis
- Species: S. nubila

Binomial name
- Stilbosis nubila Hodges, 1964

Species of moth

Stilbosis nubila is a moth in the family Cosmopterigidae. It was described by Ronald W. Hodges in 1964. It is found in North America, where it has been recorded from Utah to Arizona and New Mexico.
