= Ithome aquila =

Scientific classification
- Kingdom: Animalia
- Phylum: Arthropoda
- Clade: Pancrustacea
- Class: Insecta
- Order: Lepidoptera
- Family: Cosmopterigidae
- Genus: Ithome
- Species: I. aquila

Binomial name
- Ithome aquila Hodges, 1978

Species of moth

Ithome aquila is a moth in the family Cosmopterigidae. It was described by Ronald W. Hodges in 1978. It is found in North America, where it has been recorded from Florida.

Adults have been recorded from October to January and in May.

The larvae feed on the flowers of Pithecellobium unguis-cati.
