= Stilbosis placatrix =

Scientific classification
- Kingdom: Animalia
- Phylum: Arthropoda
- Clade: Pancrustacea
- Class: Insecta
- Order: Lepidoptera
- Family: Cosmopterigidae
- Genus: Stilbosis
- Species: S. placatrix

Binomial name
- Stilbosis placatrix (Hodges, 1969)

Synonyms
- Aeaea placatrix Hodges, 1969; Stilbosis palactrix

Species of moth

Stilbosis placatrix is a moth in the family Cosmopterigidae. It was described by Ronald W. Hodges in 1969. It is found in North America, where it has been recorded from Arkansas, Maryland and Illinois.

The wingspan is about 7 mm. Adults have been recorded on wing from May to July.
