= Prochola =

Scientific classification
- Kingdom: Animalia
- Phylum: Arthropoda
- Class: Insecta
- Order: Lepidoptera
- Family: Cosmopterigidae
- Subfamily: Chrysopeleiinae
- Genus: Prochola; Meyrick, 1915

Genus of moths

Prochola is a moth of the family Cosmopterigidae.

== Species ==
- Prochola aedilis
- Prochola agypsota Meyrick, 1922 (from Brazil)
- Prochola basichlora Meyrick, 1922 (from Brazil)
- Prochola catacentra Meyrick, 1922 (from Brazil)
- Prochola catholica
- Prochola chalcothorax
- Prochola chloropis Meyrick, 1922 (from Brazil)
- Prochola euclina
- Prochola fuscula
- Prochola holomorpha
- Prochola obstructa
- Prochola ochromicta
- Prochola oppidana
- Prochola orphnopa Meyrick, 1922 (from Brazil)
- Prochola orthobasis Meyrick, 1922 (from Brazil)
- Prochola pervallata Meyrick, 1922 (from Brazil)
- Prochola prasophanes Meyrick, 1922 (from Brazil)
- Prochola revecta
- Prochola sancticola
- Prochola semialbata Meyrick, 1922 (from Brazil)
- Prochola sollers
- Prochola subtincta Meyrick, 1922 (from Brazil)
