= Ithome cathidrota =

Scientific classification
- Kingdom: Animalia
- Phylum: Arthropoda
- Class: Insecta
- Order: Lepidoptera
- Family: Cosmopterigidae
- Genus: Ithome
- Species: I. cathidrota

Binomial name
- Ithome cathidrota (Meyrick, 1915)

Synonyms
- Cholotis cathidrota Meyrick, 1915

Species of moth

Ithome cathidrota is a moth in the family Cosmopterigidae. It was described by Edward Meyrick in 1915. It is found in Guyana.
