= Ithome pernigrella =

Scientific classification
- Kingdom: Animalia
- Phylum: Arthropoda
- Clade: Pancrustacea
- Class: Insecta
- Order: Lepidoptera
- Family: Cosmopterigidae
- Genus: Ithome
- Species: I. pernigrella

Binomial name
- Ithome pernigrella (Forbes, 1931)

Synonyms
- Eriphia pernigrella Forbes, 1931

Species of moth

Ithome pernigrella is a moth in the family Cosmopterigidae. It was described by William Trowbridge Merrifield Forbes in 1931. It is found in Puerto Rico and Cuba.
