= Prochola sollers =

Scientific classification
- Kingdom: Animalia
- Phylum: Arthropoda
- Class: Insecta
- Order: Lepidoptera
- Family: Cosmopterigidae
- Genus: Prochola
- Species: P. sollers

Binomial name
- Prochola sollers Meyrick, 1917

Species of moth

Prochola sollers is a moth of the family Cosmopterigidae. It is found in Guyana.
