= Stilbosis turrifera =

Scientific classification
- Kingdom: Animalia
- Phylum: Arthropoda
- Class: Insecta
- Order: Lepidoptera
- Family: Cosmopterigidae
- Genus: Stilbosis
- Species: S. turrifera

Binomial name
- Stilbosis turrifera Meyrick, 1921

Species of moth

Stilbosis turrifera is a moth in the family Cosmopterigidae. It was described by Edward Meyrick in 1921. It was described from Simla.
