= Prochola subtincta =

Scientific classification
- Kingdom: Animalia
- Phylum: Arthropoda
- Class: Insecta
- Order: Lepidoptera
- Family: Cosmopterigidae
- Genus: Prochola
- Species: P. subtincta

Binomial name
- Prochola subtincta (Meyrick, 1922)

Synonyms
- Syntreternis subtincta Meyrick, 1922

Species of moth

Prochola subtincta is a moth of the family Cosmopterigidae. It is found in Brazil.
