= Perimede circitor =

Scientific classification
- Kingdom: Animalia
- Phylum: Arthropoda
- Clade: Pancrustacea
- Class: Insecta
- Order: Lepidoptera
- Family: Cosmopterigidae
- Genus: Perimede
- Species: P. circitor

Binomial name
- Perimede circitor Hodges, 1969

Species of moth

Perimede circitor is a moth in the family Cosmopterigidae. It was described by Ronald W. Hodges in 1969. It is found in North America, where it has been recorded from Arkansas, Illinois and Ontario.

The wingspan is 7–10 mm. The forewings are mottled dark gray, with four black spots. The hindwings are slightly paler than the forewings. Adults have been recorded on wing from July to August.
