= Metriotes jaeckhi =

Scientific classification
- Kingdom: Animalia
- Phylum: Arthropoda
- Clade: Pancrustacea
- Class: Insecta
- Order: Lepidoptera
- Family: Coleophoridae
- Genus: Metriotes
- Species: M. jaeckhi

Binomial name
- Metriotes jaeckhi Baldizzone, 1985

Species of moth

Metriotes jaeckhi is a moth of the family Coleophoridae. It is found in France, Portugal and Spain.
