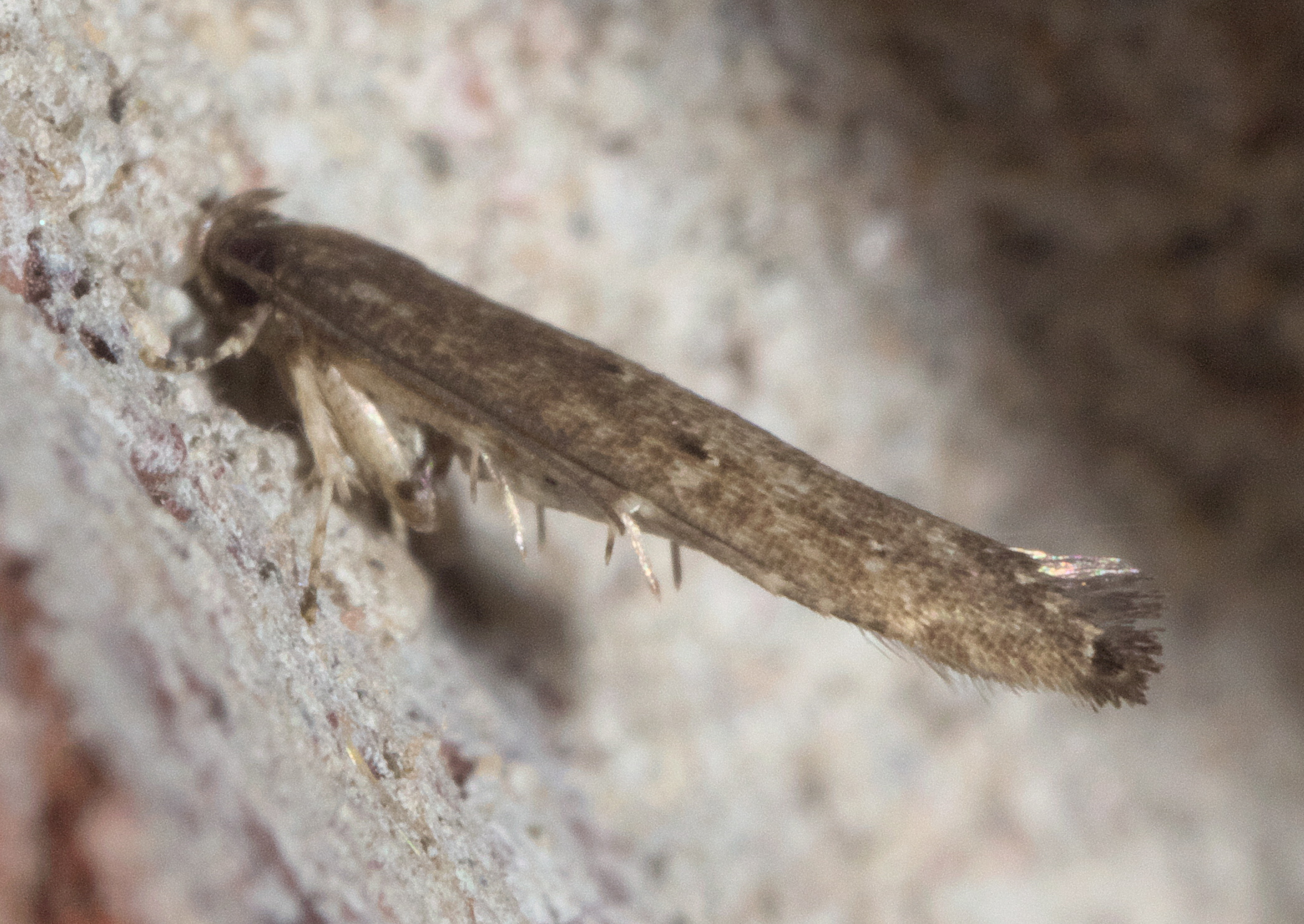

Scientific classification
- Kingdom: Animalia
- Phylum: Arthropoda
- Clade: Pancrustacea
- Class: Insecta
- Order: Lepidoptera
- Family: Cosmopterigidae
- Subfamily: Chrysopeleiinae
- Genus: Perimede; Chambers, 1874

= Perimede =

Genus of moths

Perimede is a genus of moths in the family Cosmopterigidae.

== Species ==
- Perimede annulata Busck, 1914
- Perimede battis Hodges, 1962
- Perimede catapasta Walsingham, 1909
- Perimede circitor Hodges, 1969
- Perimede citeriella Sinev, 1986
- Perimede decimanella Sinev, 1986
- Perimede erema Hodges, 1969
- Perimede erransella Chambers, 1874
- Perimede falcata Braun, 1919
- Perimede grandis Hodges, 1978
- Perimede latris Hodges, 1962
- Perimede maniola Hodges, 1969
- Perimede parilis Hodges, 1969
- Perimede purpurescens Forbes, 1931
- Perimede ricina Hodges, 1962
