= Prochola fuscula =

Scientific classification
- Kingdom: Animalia
- Phylum: Arthropoda
- Clade: Pancrustacea
- Class: Insecta
- Order: Lepidoptera
- Family: Cosmopterigidae
- Genus: Prochola
- Species: P. fuscula

Binomial name
- Prochola fuscula Forbes, 1931

Species of moth

Prochola fuscula is a moth of the family Cosmopterigidae. It is found in Puerto Rico.
