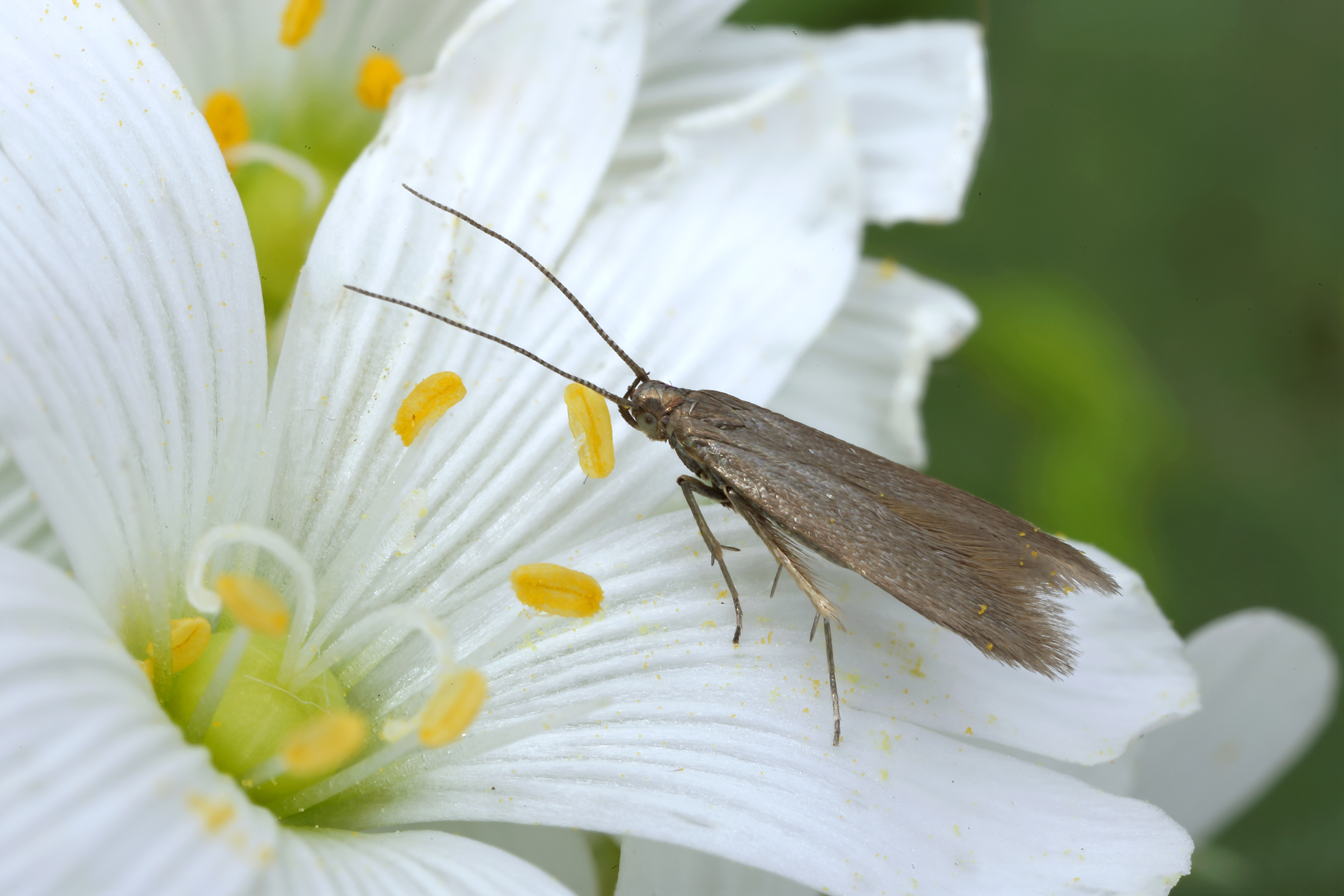

Scientific classification
- Domain: Eukaryota
- Kingdom: Animalia
- Phylum: Arthropoda
- Class: Insecta
- Order: Lepidoptera
- Family: Coleophoridae
- Genus: Metriotes
- Species: M. lutarea

Binomial name
- Metriotes lutarea (Haworth, 1828)

Synonyms
- Porrectaria lutarea Haworth, 1828; Butalis modestella Duponchel, 1839; Coleophora splendidella Lienig & Zeller, 1846; Metriotes bucovinella Nemes, 2004

= Metriotes lutarea =

Species of moth

Metriotes lutarea is a moth of the family Coleophoridae. It is found in most of Europe (except the Iberian Peninsula and most of the Balkan Peninsula) and Turkey.

The wingspan is 9–11 mm (0.35–0.43 in). Adults are on wing in May and are day-active.

The larvae feed on the seeds of greater stitchwort (Stellaria holostea) and Thesium montanum.
