= Siskiwitia falcata =

Scientific classification
- Kingdom: Animalia
- Phylum: Arthropoda
- Clade: Pancrustacea
- Class: Insecta
- Order: Lepidoptera
- Family: Cosmopterigidae
- Genus: Siskiwitia
- Species: S. falcata

Binomial name
- Siskiwitia falcata Hodges, 1978

Species of moth

Siskiwitia falcata is a moth in the family Cosmopterigidae. It was described by Ronald W. Hodges in 1978. It is found in North America, where it has been recorded from Florida.

The wingspan is about 6 mm. Adults have been recorded on wing from April to June.
