= Rhynchosia difformis =

Scientific classification
- Kingdom: Plantae
- Clade: Tracheophytes
- Clade: Angiosperms
- Clade: Eudicots
- Clade: Rosids
- Order: Fabales
- Family: Fabaceae
- Subfamily: Faboideae
- Genus: Rhynchosia
- Species: R. difformis

Binomial name
- Rhynchosia difformis (Elliott) A.DC.

Species of plant

Rhynchosia difformis, commonly known as doubleform snoutbean, is a perennial herbaceous vine endemic to the southeastern United States.

== Description ==
Rhynchosia difformis grows along the ground or climbs, reaching 0.5 to 1 meter in length. Its stems are strongly angled and covered with soft, tawny-colored trichomes. The leaves are usually made up of three leaflets, although the lowest ones may have only one. Leaflets are rounded to oval in shape, 1.5 to 4 cm long, with a network of visible veins and tiny glands on both surfaces. The plant lacks stipels, but has larger, persistent stipules at the base of the leaves. Flowers are yellow and grow in small clusters (2 to 8 per group) along short stalks in the leaf joints. Each flower has a small, narrow bract at its base that falls off early. The flower shape is typical of the pea family, with five petals and a tubular base. The calyx is covered with short hairs and has pointed lobes. The fruit is a small, flattened pod, 1.5 to 2 cm long and 6 to 8 mm wide, with soft hairs and small glands, and usually contains one or two seeds.

The root system includes tubers which store non-structural carbohydrates that assist the plant in resprouting following fire and persisting during periods of fire exclusion.

== Distribution and habitat ==
Rhynchosia difformis is distributed from southeastern Virginia south to central peninsular Florida and west to East Texas. It grows in longleaf pine sandhills and other dry woodlands.
