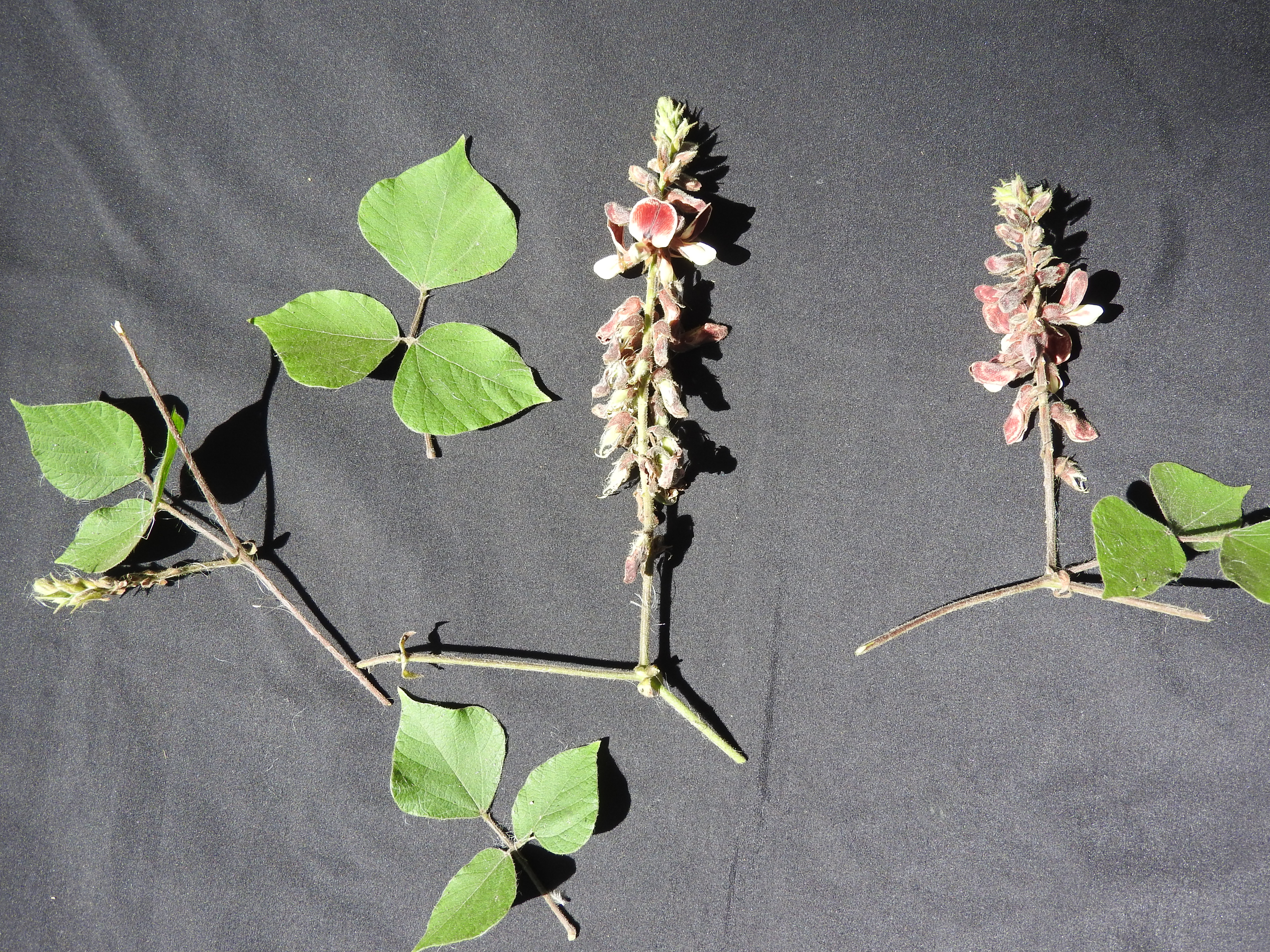

Scientific classification
- Kingdom: Plantae
- Clade: Tracheophytes
- Clade: Angiosperms
- Clade: Eudicots
- Clade: Rosids
- Order: Fabales
- Family: Fabaceae
- Subfamily: Faboideae
- Genus: Rhynchosia
- Species: R. viscosa

Binomial name
- Rhynchosia viscosa (Roth) DC.

Synonyms
- Glycine viscosa Roth.; Rhynchosia grevei Drake

= Rhynchosia viscosa =

Species of legume

Rhynchosia viscosa is a species of flowering plant in the legume family, found in altitudes ranging from 0 to 500 meters in dry climates.

== Distribution ==
Comoros, Madagascar, Mascarenes, Africa and Asia.
