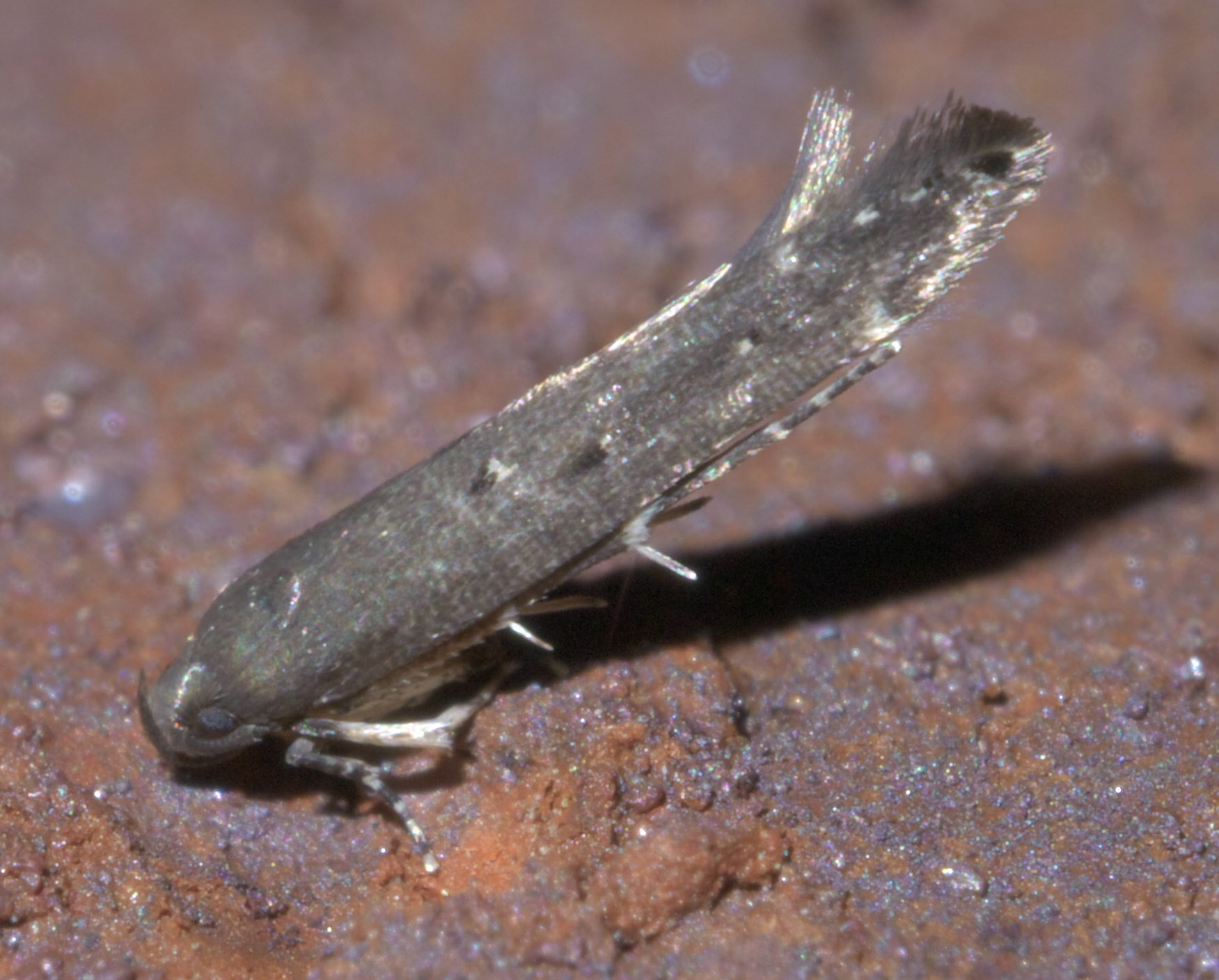

Scientific classification
- Kingdom: Animalia
- Phylum: Arthropoda
- Clade: Pancrustacea
- Class: Insecta
- Order: Lepidoptera
- Family: Cosmopterigidae
- Genus: Perimede
- Species: P. erransella

Binomial name
- Perimede erransella Chambers, 1874

= Perimede erransella =

Species of moth

Perimede erransella is a moth in the family Cosmopterigidae. It was described by Vactor Tousey Chambers in 1874. It is found in North America, where it has been recorded from Nova Scotia and southern Quebec to Florida, Kentucky and Louisiana.

The wingspan is about 12 mm. Adults have been recorded on wing year round.

The larvae feed on Liriodendron tulipifera, Carya tomentosa, Quercus velutina, Quercus coccinea, Toxodium distichum and Ulmus species.
