= Eumenodora =

Scientific classification
- Domain: Eukaryota
- Kingdom: Animalia
- Phylum: Arthropoda
- Class: Insecta
- Order: Lepidoptera
- Family: Xyloryctidae
- Genus: Eumenodora; Meyrick, 1906

Moth genus in family Xyloryctidae

Eumenodora is a genus of moth in the family Xyloryctidae. It was formerly placed in the family Cosmopterigidae.

== Species ==
- Eumenodora encrypta Meyrick, 1906
- Eumenodora tetrachorda Meyrick, 1924
