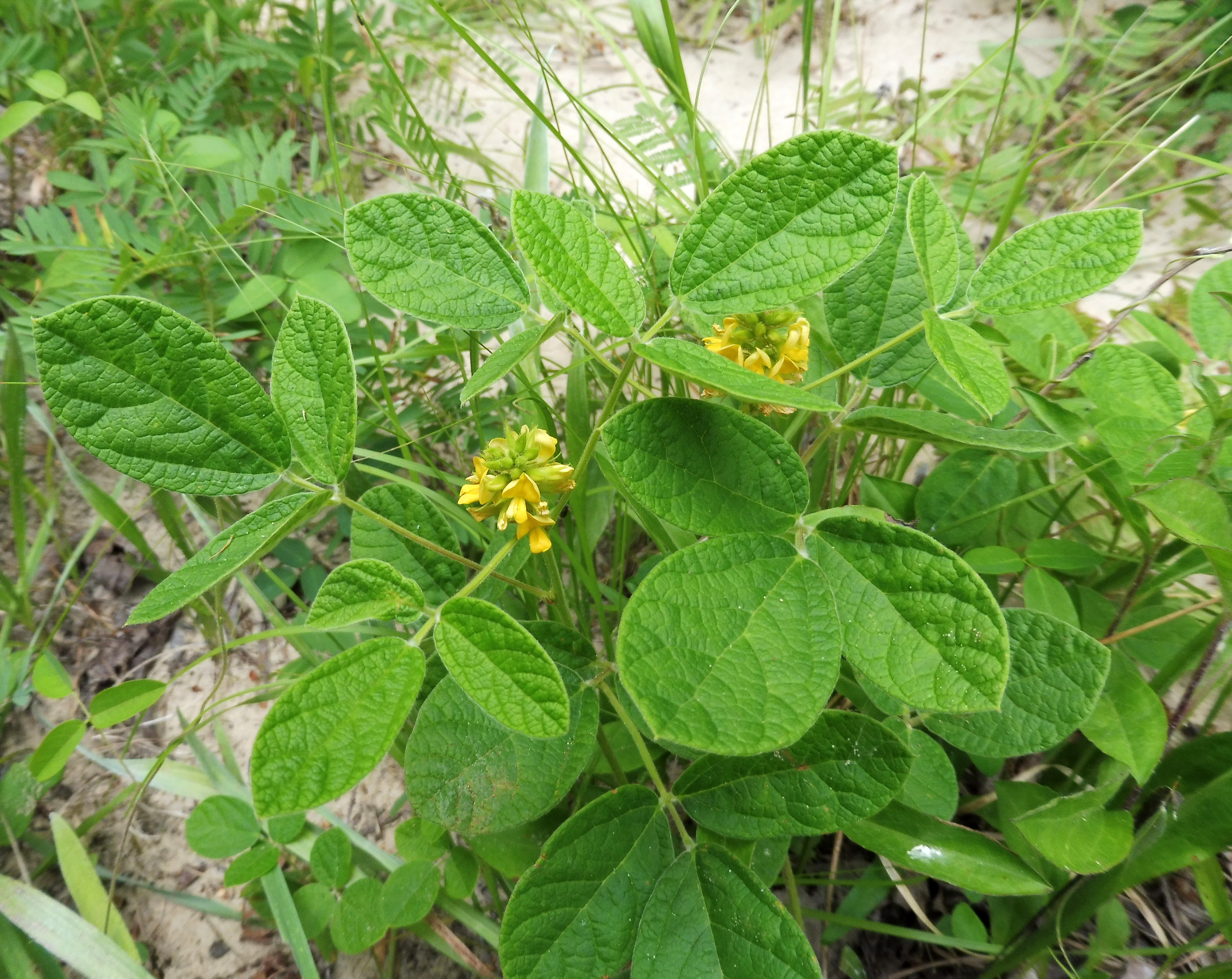

Scientific classification
- Kingdom: Plantae
- Clade: Embryophytes
- Clade: Tracheophytes
- Clade: Spermatophytes
- Clade: Angiosperms
- Clade: Eudicots
- Clade: Rosids
- Order: Fabales
- Family: Fabaceae
- Subfamily: Faboideae
- Genus: Rhynchosia
- Species: R. tomentosa

Binomial name
- Rhynchosia tomentosa (L.) Hooker & Arnott

= Rhynchosia tomentosa =

Species of legume

Rhynchosia tomentosa, commonly known as the twining snoutbean is a species of plant in the legume family. It is native to the Southeastern United States, where it is primarily found in dry, open woodlands and sandhills.

== Description ==
R. tomentosa is a perennial that produces yellow flowers in the summer. It is an erect herb that may reach a height between 3 and 9 meters (approximately 10 to 29.5 feet). Leaves are 2 to 7 centimeters (0.8 to 2.7 inches) in length and are oblong to elliptic in shape.

== Distribution and habitat ==
This species has been found at elevations up to 240 meters (787 feet) above sea level. within the Coastal Plain region of the United States.

R. tomentosa occurs in habitat types such as longleaf pine sandhills, old growth longleaf pine stands, hammocks, and glades, among other environments. It has also been documented as occurring in previously disturbed habitats, such as along roadsides or within recently-burned pinewoods.

This species acts as an indicator species in longleaf woodland communities.

== Ecology ==
Rhynchosia tomentosa is insect pollinated and is recorded to have been visited in northern Florida by Anthidiellum notatum, Ceratina, Megachile albitarsis, Megachile exilis, Megachile georgica.
