= Stilbosis polygoni =

Scientific classification
- Kingdom: Animalia
- Phylum: Arthropoda
- Clade: Pancrustacea
- Class: Insecta
- Order: Lepidoptera
- Family: Cosmopterigidae
- Genus: Stilbosis
- Species: S. polygoni

Binomial name
- Stilbosis polygoni (Zeller, 1877)

Synonyms
- Metriotes polygoni Zeller, 1877

Species of moth

Stilbosis polygoni is a moth in the family Cosmopterigidae. It was described by Zeller in 1877. It is found in Colombia.
