= Rhynchosia malacophylla =

Scientific classification
- Kingdom: Plantae
- Clade: Tracheophytes
- Clade: Angiosperms
- Clade: Eudicots
- Clade: Rosids
- Order: Fabales
- Family: Fabaceae
- Subfamily: Faboideae
- Genus: Rhynchosia
- Species: R. malacophylla

Binomial name
- Rhynchosia malacophylla (Spreng.) Bojer

Synonyms
- List: Glycine malacophylla Spreng.; Glycine mollis Hook.; Rhynchosia flavissima (Schweinf.) Hochst. ex Baker; Rhynchosia hookeri G.Don; Rhynchosia sennaarensis Hochst. ex Schweinf.

Species of plant in the genus Rhynchosia

Rhynchosia malacophylla is a species of flowering plant in the genus Rhynchosia, native to Africa (mostly the Horn of Africa and nearby areas), and Yemen. It tends to be a weed in sugarcane plantations.
