= Hyalochna allevata =

Scientific classification
- Kingdom: Animalia
- Phylum: Arthropoda
- Class: Insecta
- Order: Lepidoptera
- Family: Cosmopterigidae
- Genus: Hyalochna
- Species: H. allevata

Binomial name
- Hyalochna allevata Meyrick, 1918

Species of moth

Hyalochna allevata is a moth in the family Cosmopterigidae. It was described by Edward Meyrick in 1918. It is found in South Africa.

This species has a wingspan of 27 millimetres (1.1 in), the head is yellow ochreous, the forewings are brownish with faint violet tinge, the basal third marked irregularly with light yellow ochreous.
