= Hyalochna =

Scientific classification
- Kingdom: Animalia
- Phylum: Arthropoda
- Class: Insecta
- Order: Lepidoptera
- Family: Cosmopterigidae
- Subfamily: Scaeosophinae
- Genus: Hyalochna; Meyrick, 1918

Genus of moths

Hyalochna is a genus of moths in the family Cosmopterigidae.

== Species ==
- Hyalochna allevata Meyrick, 1918
- Hyalochna malgassella Viette, 1963
