= Hyalochna malgassella =

Scientific classification
- Kingdom: Animalia
- Phylum: Arthropoda
- Class: Insecta
- Order: Lepidoptera
- Family: Cosmopterigidae
- Genus: Hyalochna
- Species: H. malgassella

Binomial name
- Hyalochna malgassella Viette, 1963

Species of moth

Hyalochna malgassella is a moth in the family Cosmopterigidae. It was described by Pierre Viette in 1963. It is found in Madagascar.
