= Cyphothyris =

Scientific classification
- Kingdom: Animalia
- Phylum: Arthropoda
- Class: Insecta
- Order: Lepidoptera
- Family: Cosmopterigidae
- Subfamily: Scaeosophinae
- Genus: Cyphothyris; Meyrick, 1914

Genus of moths

Cyphothyris is a genus of moth in the family Cosmopterigidae.

== Species ==
- Cyphothyris disphaerias Meyrick, 1932
- Cyphothyris ophryodes Meyrick, 1914
- Cyphothyris pyrrhophrys Meyrick, 1932
