= Cyphothyris ophryodes =

Scientific classification
- Kingdom: Animalia
- Phylum: Arthropoda
- Class: Insecta
- Order: Lepidoptera
- Family: Cosmopterigidae
- Genus: Cyphothyris
- Species: C. ophryodes

Binomial name
- Cyphothyris ophryodes Meyrick, 1914

Species of moth

Cyphothyris ophryodes is a moth in the family Cosmopterigidae. It was described by Edward Meyrick in 1914. It is found in New Guinea and Sri Lanka.
