= Cyphothyris disphaerias =

Scientific classification
- Kingdom: Animalia
- Phylum: Arthropoda
- Class: Insecta
- Order: Lepidoptera
- Family: Cosmopterigidae
- Genus: Cyphothyris
- Species: C. disphaerias

Binomial name
- Cyphothyris disphaerias Meyrick, 1932

Species of moth

Cyphothyris disphaerias is a moth in the family Cosmopterigidae. It was described by Edward Meyrick in 1932. It is found on New Guinea.
