= List of Lepidoptera of French Polynesia =

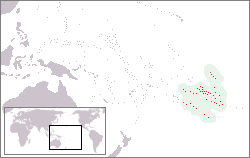
Location of French Polynesia

Lepidoptera of French Polynesia consist of both the butterflies and moths recorded from French Polynesia.

According to a recent estimate, there are a total of roughly 400 Lepidoptera species present on the islands of French Polynesia.

== Butterflies ==
=== Hesperiidae ===
- Badamia atrox collenettei Evans, 1934
- Badamia exclamationis (Fabricius, 1775)

=== Lycaenidae ===
- Catochrysops taitensis (Boisduval, 1832)
- Hypojamides catochloris (Boisduval, 1832)
- Jamides bochus (Stoll, 1782)
  - Jamides bochus ruruturi Riley, 1929
- Lampides boeticus (Linnaeus, 1767)
- Nacaduba tahitiensis Hara & Hirowatari, 1989
- Ocaria ocrisia (Hewitson, 1868)
- Petrelaea dana (de Nicéville, 1884)
- Zizina labradus cheesmanae (Poulton & Riley, 1928)
- Zizina otis (Fabricius, 1787)

=== Nymphalidae ===
- Atella gaberti Guerin-Meneville, 1838
- Atella marquesana Riley, 1935
- Danaus plexippus (Linnaeus, 1758)
- Diadema auge otahaiti Cheesman,
- Euploea algea (Godart, 1819)
- Euploea eleutho (Quoy & Gaimard, 1815)
- Euploea helcita Boisduval, 1859
  - Euploea helcita walkeri Druce, 1890
- Euploea lewinii Felder & Felder, 1865
- Hypolimnas bolina (Linnaeus, 1758)
  - Hypolimnas bolina otaheitae Felder, 1862
- Junonia villida (Fabricius, 1787)
  - Junonia villida longfieldae Riley, 1929
  - Junonia villida taitica Fruhstorfer, 1912
- Libythea collenettei Poulton & Riley, 1928
- Melanitis leda solandra (Fabricius, 1775)
- Melanitis leda taitensis (Felder, 1862)
- Phalanta marquesana Poulton & Riley, 1935
- Taenaris phorcas phorcas (Westwood, 1851)
- Vagrans egista (Cramer, 1780)
- Vagrans gaberti Waterhouse, 1920
- Vanessa itea (Fabricius, 1775)

== Moths ==
=== Alucitidae ===
- Alucita pselioxantha Meyrick, 1929

=== Arctiidae ===
- Argina astrea (Drury, 1773)
- Lambula erema Collenette, 1934
- Utetheisa ornatrix (Linnaeus, 1758)
- Utetheisa pulchella (Linnaeus, 1758)
- Utetheisa pulchelloides Hampson, 1907

=== Carposinidae ===
- Peragrarchis pelograpta (Meyrick, 1928)

=== Choreutidae ===
- Anthophila chalcotoxa (Meyrick, 1886)
- Anthophila chelaspis (Meyrick, 1928)

=== Copromorphidae ===
- Dryanassa erebactis Meyrick 1936

=== Cosmopterigidae ===
- Anatrachyntis incertulella (Walker, 1864)
- Anatrachyntis tridigitella (Walsingham 1907)
- Asymphorodes acerba Meyrick, 1928
- Asymphorodes acritopterus J.F.G. Clarke, 1986
- Asymphorodes acrophrictis Meyrick, 1934
- Asymphorodes admiranda Meyrick, 1934
- Asymphorodes adynatus J.F.G. Clarke, 1986
- Asymphorodes aenigma J.F.G. Clarke, 1986
- Asymphorodes albicoma J.F.G. Clarke, 1986
- Asymphorodes amblysoma J.F.G. Clarke, 1986
- Asymphorodes aporia J.F.G. Clarke, 1986
- Asymphorodes balanotis Meyrick, 1934
- Asymphorodes bipunctatus J.F.G. Clarke, 1986
- Asymphorodes brevimacula J.F.G. Clarke, 1986
- Asymphorodes canicoma J.F.G. Clarke, 1986
- Asymphorodes chalcocoma J.F.G. Clarke, 1986
- Asymphorodes chalcopterus J.F.G. Clarke, 1986
- Asymphorodes chalcosoma J.F.G. Clarke, 1986
- Asymphorodes chalcozona Meyrick, 1935
- Asymphorodes chrysophanes J.F.G. Clarke, 1986
- Asymphorodes cicatricula J.F.G. Clarke, 1986
- Asymphorodes circopis Meyrick, 1928
- Asymphorodes cirsodes Meyrick, 1928
- Asymphorodes coesyrias Meyrick, 1928
- Asymphorodes culminis J.F.G. Clarke, 1986
- Asymphorodes cuneatus J.F.G. Clarke, 1986
- Asymphorodes diamphidius J.F.G. Clarke, 1986
- Asymphorodes didyma J.F.G. Clarke, 1986
- Asymphorodes diffidentia J.F.G. Clarke, 1986
- Asymphorodes emphereia J.F.G. Clarke, 1986
- Asymphorodes ergodes Meyrick, 1934
- Asymphorodes favilla J.F.G. Clarke, 1986
- Asymphorodes fractura J.F.G. Clarke, 1986
- Asymphorodes hemileucus J.F.G. Clarke, 1986
- Asymphorodes holoporphyra Meyrick, 1934
- Asymphorodes homosoma J.F.G. Clarke, 1986
- Asymphorodes honoria J.F.G. Clarke, 1986
- Asymphorodes hypostema J.F.G. Clarke, 1986
- Asymphorodes ingravescens Meyrick, 1934
- Asymphorodes interstincta Meyrick, 1928
- Asymphorodes lenticula J.F.G. Clarke, 1986
- Asymphorodes leptotes J.F.G. Clarke, 1986
- Asymphorodes leucoloma J.F.G. Clarke, 1986
- Asymphorodes leucoterma Meyrick, 1928
- Asymphorodes lucerna J.F.G. Clarke, 1986
- Asymphorodes lucidus J.F.G. Clarke, 1986
- Asymphorodes macrogramma J.F.G. Clarke, 1986
- Asymphorodes mediostriatus J.F.G. Clarke, 1986
- Asymphorodes melanosoma J.F.G. Clarke, 1986
- Asymphorodes mesoxanthus J.F.G. Clarke, 1986
- Asymphorodes monoxesta Meyrick, 1928
- Asymphorodes montgomeryi J.F.G. Clarke, 1986
- Asymphorodes myronota Meyrick, 1928
- Asymphorodes nebrias J.F.G. Clarke, 1986
- Asymphorodes nephocirca Meyrick, 1928
- Asymphorodes nigricornis J.F.G. Clarke, 1986
- Asymphorodes nuciferae J.F.G. Clarke, 1986
- Asymphorodes ochrogramma J.F.G. Clarke, 1986
- Asymphorodes oculisignis Meyrick, 1934
- Asymphorodes paraporia J.F.G. Clarke, 1986
- Asymphorodes perfuga Meyrick, 1928
- Asymphorodes phaeochorda Meyrick, 1928
- Asymphorodes phaeodelta J.F.G. Clarke, 1986
- Asymphorodes phalarogramma J.F.G. Clarke, 1986
- Asymphorodes plectographa Meyrick, 1928
- Asymphorodes plemmelia J.F.G. Clarke, 1986
- Asymphorodes poliopterus J.F.G. Clarke, 1986
- Asymphorodes polluta Meyrick, 1928
- Asymphorodes porphyrarcha Meyrick, 1928
- Asymphorodes remigiata J.F.G. Clarke, 1986
- Asymphorodes regina J.F.G. Clarke, 1986
- Asymphorodes semiluteus J.F.G. Clarke, 1986
- Asymphorodes seminiger J.F.G. Clarke, 1986
- Asymphorodes sericeus J.F.G. Clarke, 1986
- Asymphorodes sphenocopa Meyrick, 1928
- Asymphorodes spodogramma J.F.G. Clarke, 1986
- Asymphorodes trichogramma J.F.G. Clarke, 1986
- Asymphorodes trigrapha J.F.G. Clarke, 1986
- Asymphorodes valligera Meyrick, 1928
- Asymphorodes xanthostola Meyrick, 1934
- Asymphorodes xestophanes Meyrick, 1934
- Cosmopterix aphranassa Meyrick, 1926
- Cosmopterix flavofasciata (E. Wollaston, 1879)
- Cosmopterix melanarches Meyrick, 1928
- Cosmopterix aphranassa Meyrick, 1926
- Cosmopterix diandra (Clarke, 1986)
- Cosmopterix nonna Clarke, 1986
- Iressa microsema Clarke, 1986
- Iressa neoleuca Clarke, 1971
- Labdia ceriocosma Meyrick, 1934
- Labdia dicyanitis Meyrick, 1934
- Labdia leucoxantha Meyrick, 1927
- Limnaecia astathopis Meyrick, 1934
- Microzestis inelegans Meyrick, 1929
- Pyroderces lunulifera Meyrick, 1934
- Stagmatophora spintheropus Meyrick, 1934
- Syntomaula simulatella (Walker, 1864)
- Trissodoris honorariella (Walsingham, 1907)
- Ulochora perfuga Meyrick, 1928

=== Crambidae ===
- Aethaloessa floridalis (Zeller, 1852)
- Archernis fulvalis Hampson, 1913
- Bradina perlucidalis Hampson, 1897
- Bradina tormentifera Meyrick, 1929
- Calamochrous thermochra Meyrick, 1929
- Chrysophyllis lucivaga Meyrick, 1934
- Cnaphalocrocis creonalis (Walker, 1859)
- Cnaphalocrocis hemicrossa (Meyrick, 1886)
- Cnaphalocrocis poeyalis (Boisduval, 1833)
- Cnaphalocrocis trapezalis (Guenée, 1854)
- Crocidolomia binotalis Zeller, 1852
- Diaphania indica (Saunders, 1851)
- Diasemiopsis ramburialis (Duponchel, 1834)
- Eudonia chrysomicta (Meyrick, 1929)
- Eudonia citrocosma (Meyrick, 1929)
- Eudonia clerica (Meyrick, 1929)
- Eudonia officialis (Meyrick, 1929)
- Eudonia opostactis (Meyrick, 1929)
- Eurrhyparodes tricoloralis (Zeller, 1852)
- Glyphodes multilinealis Kenrick, 1907
- Glyphodes phormingopa (Meyrick, 1934)
- Glyphodes psammocyma (Meyrick, 1929)
- Glyphodes uranoptris (Meyrick, 1929)
- Hellula undalis (Fabricius, 1781)
- Herpetogramma cleoropa (Meyrick, 1934)
- Herpetogramma licarsisalis (Walker, 1859)
- Herpetogramma phthorosticta (Meyrick, 1929)
- Herpetogramma stultalis (Walker, 1859)
- Hyalobathra illectalis (Walker, 1859)
- Hydriris ornatalis (Duponchel, 1832)
- Idioblasta acleropa (Meyrick, 1934)
- Idioblasta isoterma (Meyrick, 1934)
- Idioblasta lacteata Warren, 1891
- Idioblasta procellaris (Meyrick, 1934)
- Idioblasta straminata Warren, 1891
- Lamprosema foedalis (Guenée 1854)
- Marasmianympha eupselias (Meyrick, 1929)
- Maruca vitrata (Fabricius, 1787)
- Omiodes diemenalis (Guenée, 1854)
- Palpita bacteata (Warren, 1891)
- Paratalanta aureolalis (Lederer, 1863)
- Piletocera signiferalis (Wallengren, 1860)
- Prophantis octoguttalis (Felder & Rogenhofer, 1875)
- Pythagoraea categorica Meyrick, 1929
- Scoparia chrysopetra Meyrick, 1929
- Scoparia commercialis Meyrick, 1929
- Scoparia exterminata Meyrick, 1929
- Scoparia philorphna Meyrick, 1929
- Scoparia psednopa Meyrick, 1929
- Scoparia spectacularis Meyrick, 1929
- Spoladea recurvalis (Fabricius, 1775)
- Stemorrhages euthalassa (Meyrick, 1934)
- Stemorrhages thetydalis (Guenée, 1854)
- Sufetula hemiophthalma (Meyrick, 1884)
- Tatobotys vibrata Meyrick, 1929

=== Gelechiidae ===
- Pectinophora gossypiella (Saunders, 1843)
- Phthorimaea operculella (Zeller, 1873)
- Stoeberhinus testaceus Butler, 1881

=== Geometridae ===
- Anisodes decolorata (Warren, 1897)
- Anisodes niveopuncta (Warren, 1897)
- Anisodes samoana (Warren, 1897)
- Bosara montana Orhant, 2003
- Chloroclystis ambundata Prout, 1929
- Chloroclystis coloptila Prout, 1929
- Chloroclystis lepta (Meyrick, 1886)
- Chloroclystis pitoi Clarke, 1971
- Chloroclystis torninubis Prout, 1929
- Cleora albipuncta Orhant, 2003
- Cleora caliginosa Orhant, 2003
- Cleora collenettei Prout, 1929
- Cleora dodonaeae Prout, 1929
- Cleora esoterica Prout, 1929
  - Cleora esoterica pusillanimis Prout, 1933
- Cleora leucostigma Prout, 1929
- Cleora licornaria (Guenée, 1858)
- Cleora longipectina Orhant, 2002
- Cleora myrmidonaria (Guenée, 1858)
- Cleora nitidula Orhant, 2002
- Cleora stenoglypta Prout, 1929
- Gymnoscelis concinna Swinhoe, 1902
- Gymnoscelis erymna (Meyrick, 1886)
- Gymnoscelis imparatalis (Walker, 1865)
- Gymnoscelis tristrigosa Butler, 1881
- Scopula angusticallis Prout, 1933
- Scopula menytes Prout, 1933
- Scopula oxystoma Prout, 1929
- Scopula tahitiensis Orhant, 2003
- Scopula tersicallis Prout, 1929
- Thalassodes chloropsis Meyrick, 1886
- Thalassodes microchloropis Holloway, 1979
- Thalassodes pilaria Guenée, 1857

=== Gracillariidae ===
- Caloptilia crypsidelta (Meyrick, 1926)
- Caloptilia deltanthes (Meyrick, 1934)
- Caloptilia hilaropis (Meyrick, 1926)
- Epicephala colymbetella Meyrick 1880
- Parectopa pontificalis Meyrick, 1928

=== Heliodinidae ===
- Lissocnemitis argolyca Meyrick, 1934

=== Hyblaeidae ===
- Hyblaea puera (Cramer, 1777)

=== Immidae ===
- Imma catapsesta Meyrick, 1934
- Imma chloroplintha Meyrick, 1928
- Imma fulminatrix Meyrick, 1934
- Imma oxypselia Meyrick, 1928
- Imma semiclara Meyrick, 1928

=== Noctuidae ===
- Acanthodelta marquesanus (Collenette, 1928)
- Achaea janata (Linnaeus, 1758)
- Achaea robinsoni Holloway 1982
- Aedia sericea (Butler, 1882)
- Agrotis ipsilon (Hufnagel, 1766)
- Amyna natalis (Walker, 1858)
- Amyna octo (Guenée, 1852)
- Anigraea ochrobasis Hampson, 1912
- Anomis flava (Fabricius, 1775)
- Anomis involuta (Walker, 1858)
- Anomis involuta vitiensis Butler, 1886
- Anomis marauensis Orhant, 2002
- Anomis sabulifera (Guenée, 1852)
- Anticarsia irrorata (Fabricius, 1781)
- Athetis nonagrica (Walker, 1863)
- Athetis thoracica (Moore, 1884)
- Athyrma discolor (Fabricius, 1794)
- Bastilla insularum (Orhant, 2002)
- Bastilla tahitiensis (Orhant, 2002)
- Bastilla vitiensis (Butler, 1886)
- Callopistria alticola Orhant, 2002
- Callopistria maillardi (Guenée, 1862)
- Callopistria ouria
  - Callopistria ouria nanodes Collenette, 1934
  - Callopistria ouria ouria Collenette, 1928
- Callopistria reticulata (Pagenstecher, 1884)
- Callopistria steevei Orhant, 2002
- Catephia linteola Guenée, 1852
- Chasmina tibialis (Fabricius, 1775)
- Chrysodeixis chalcites (Esper, 1789)
- Chrysodeixis collardi (Orhant, 2002)
- Chrysodeixis copiaria Orhant, 2003
- Chrysodeixis eriosoma (Doubleday, 1843)
- Condica conducta (Walker 1857)
- Condica hollowayi Orhant 2003
- Condica illecta (Walker, 1865)
- Ctenoplusia albostriata (Bremer & Gray, 1853)
- Earias huegeliana Gaede, 1937
- Earias vittella (Fabricius, 1794)
- Eublemma anachoresis (Wallengren, 1863)
- Eublemma crassiuscula (Walker, 1864)
- Eublemma rivula (Moore, 1882)
- Eudocima fullonia (Clerck, 1764)
- Eudocima materna (Linnaeus, 1767)
- Euplexia vetula Clarke, 1971
- Fautaua diagonalis Collenette, 1928
- Fautaua innupta Collenette, 1928
- Fautaua minor Orhant, 2003
- Grammodes oculicola Walker, 1858
- Helicoverpa armigera (Hübner, 1805)
- Helicoverpa assulta (Guenée, 1852)
- Hydrillodes crispipalpus Collenette, 1928
- Hydrillodes epidela Orhant, 2003
- Hydrillodes melanozona Collenette, 1928
- Hydrillodes sechani Orhant, 2003
- Hypena cracens Orhant, 2003
- Hypena fulvifasciata Orhant, 2003
- Hypena longfieldae Collenette, 1928
- Hypena perexilis Orhant, 2003
- Hypena sanctigeorgii Collenette, 1928
- Hypena walkeri Collenette, 1928
- Hypocala deflorata (Fabricius, 1793)
- Lacera noctilio (Fabricius 1794)
- Leucania loreyi (Duponchel, 1827)
- Leucania stenographa Lower, 1900
- Luceria oculalis (Moore, 1877)
- Maliattha ritsemae (Snellen, 1880)
- Mocis frugalis (Fabricius, 1775)
- Mocis trifasciata (Stephens, 1829)
- Mythimna mouai Orhant, 2002
- Mythimna separata (Walker, 1865)
- Nola insularum (Collenette, 1928)
- Ophiusa coronata (Fabricius, 1775)
- Parallelia marquesanus (Collenette, 1929)
- Penicillaria jocosatrix Guenée, 1852
- Polydesma boarmoides Guenée, 1852
- Polydesma umbricola Boisduval, 1833
- Prospalta serva (Walker, 1858)
- Rhesalides curvata (Lucas, 1895)
- Savoca divitalis (Walker, 1863)
- Serrodes campana Guenée, 1852
- Serrodes mediopallens Prout, 1924
- Simplicia caeneusalis (Walker, 1858)
- Spodoptera exempta (Walker, 1856)
- Spodoptera litura (Fabricius, 1775)
- Spodoptera mauritia (Boisduval, 1833)
- Spodoptera retina (Freyer 1854)
- Targalla delatrix (Guenée, 1852)
- Tiracola plagiata (Walker, 1857)
- Trichoplusia ni (Hübner, 1803)

=== Oecophoridae ===
- Autosticha pelodes Meyrick, 1928
- Stoeberhinus testaceus Butler, 1881

=== Plutellidae ===
- Plutella xylostella (Linnaeus, 1758)

=== Pterophoridae ===
- Marasmarcha pumilio (Zeller, 1873)

=== Pyralidae ===
- Achroia grisella (Fabricius, 1793)
- Acrobasis ptilophanes Meyrick, 1929
- Assara albicostalis (Walker, 1863)
- Assara halmophila (Meyrick, 1929)
- Cryptoblabes ardescens (Meyrick, 1929)
- Cryptoblabes plagioleuca Turner, 1904
- Ctenomeristis ochrodepta Meyrick, 1929
- Diaphania indica (Saunders, 1851)
- Endotricha mesenterialis (Walker, 1859)
- Ephestia kuehniella Zeller, 1879
- Ernophthora chrysura (Meyrick, 1929)
- Ernophthora denticornis (Meyrick, 1929)
- Ernophthora dryinandra (Meyrick, 1929)
- Ernophthora maculicostella (Ragonot, 1888)
- Etiella drososcia Meyrick, 1929
- Eucampyla inexplorata (Meyrick, 1929)
- Herculia repetita Butler, 1885
- Phycita orthoclina Meyrick, 1929

=== Sphingidae ===
- Agrius convolvuli (Linnaeus, 1758)
- Gnathothlibus collardi Haxaire, 2002
- Gnathothlibus erotus (Cramer, 1777)
- Gnathothlibus erotus eras (Boisduval, 1832)
- Hippotion celerio (Linnaeus, 1758)
- Macroglossum hirundo hirundo (Boisduval, 1832)
- Macroglossum marquesanum Collenette, 1935
- Philodila astyanor (Boisduval, 1875)

=== Stathmopodidae ===
- Stathmopoda cryptophaea Meyrick, 1922

=== Tineidae ===
- Erechthias clistopa (Meyrick, 1928)
- Erechthias coleosema (Meyrick, 1934)
- Erechthias flavistriata Walsingham, 1907
- Erechthias minuscula (Walsingham, 1897)
- Erechthias pelotricha (Meyrick, 1926)
- Erechthias percnomicta (Meyrick, 1934)
- Erechthias physocapna (Meyrick, 1928)
- Erechthias praedatrix (Meyrick, 1934)
- Erechthias psammaula (Meyrick, 1921)
- Erechthias rufimacula (Meyrick, 1934)
- Erechthias simulans (Butler, 1882)
- Erechthias sphenacma (Meyrick, 1926)
- Erechthias strangulate (Meyrick, 1928)
- Erechthias zebrina (Butler, 1881)
- Opogona aurisquamosa (Butler, 1881)
- Opogona punctata (Walsingham, 1900)
- Opogona trissostacta Meyrick, 1934
- Pisistrata trypheropa Meyrick, 1924
- Praeacedes atomosella (Walker, 1863)
- Tinea monospila Meyrick, 1928
- Trachycentra calamias Meyrick, 1886

=== Tortricidae ===
- Bactra litigatrix Meyrick, 1928
- Crocidosema plebejana Zeller, 1847
- Cryptophlebia chaomorpha (Meyrick, 1928)
- Cryptophlebia pallifimbriana Bradley, 1953
- Cryptophlebia rhynchias (Meyrick, 1928)
- Dichelopa amorpha Clarke, 1986
- Dichelopa argema Clarke, 1986
- Dichelopa argoschista Meyrick, 1929
- Dichelopa argosphena Meyrick, 1934
- Dichelopa canitia Clarke, 1986
- Dichelopa castanopis Meyrick, 1934
- Dichelopa ceramocausta Meyrick, 1926
- Dichelopa chionogramma Clarke, 1986
- Dichelopa choleranthes Meyrick, 1928
- Dichelopa cirrhodoris Meyrick, 1934
- Dichelopa deltozancla Meyrick, 1926
- Dichelopa dorsata Clarke, 1986
- Dichelopa dryomorpha Meyrick, 1928
- Dichelopa exulcerata Meyrick, 1926
- Dichelopa flexura Clarke, 1986
- Dichelopa fulvistrigata Meyrick, 1928
- Dichelopa gnoma Clarke, 1986
- Dichelopa hadrotes Clarke, 1986
- Dichelopa harmodes Meyrick, 1928
- Dichelopa honoranda Meyrick, 1926
- Dichelopa iochorda Meyrick, 1926
- Dichelopa meligma Clarke, 1986
- Dichelopa ochroma Clarke, 1986
- Dichelopa orthiostyla Meyrick, 1934
- Dichelopa pachydmeta Meyrick, 1928
- Dichelopa paragnoma Clarke, 1986
- Dichelopa peropaea Meyrick, 1928
- Dichelopa phalaranthes Meyrick, 1934
- Dichelopa platyxantha Clarke, 1986
- Dichelopa porphyrophanes Meyrick, 1934
- Dichelopa praestrigata Meyrick, 1928
- Dichelopa pyrsogramma Meyrick, 1934
- Dichelopa sericopis Meyrick, 1926
- Dichelopa zona Clarke, 1986
- Dudua aprobola (Meyrick, 1886)
- Dudua eumenica (Meyrick, 1928)
- Eucosma agriochlora Meyrick, 1929
- Nesoscopa exsors Meyrick, 1926
- Strepsicrates dilacerate (Meyrick, 1928)
- Strepsicrates holotephras (Meyrick, 1924)
- Strepsicrates thyellopis (Meyrick, 1926)
- Tritopterna eocnephaea (Meyrick, 1934)

=== Yponomeutidae ===
- Prays nephelomima Meyrick, 1907
- Simaethus orthogona (Meyrick, 1886)
- Zelleria leucostrota Meyrick, 1928
