= List of Lepidoptera of the Cook Islands =

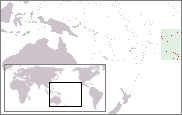
Location of the Cook Islands

The Lepidoptera of the Cook Islands consist of the butterflies and moths recorded from the Cook Islands, a self-governing island country in the South Pacific Ocean.

According to a recent estimate, about 170 Lepidoptera species are present on the Cook Islands.

== Butterflies ==
=== Lycaenidae ===
- Famegana alsulus – black-spotted grass-blue
- Jamides bochus – dark cerulean
- Lampides boeticus – long-tailed blue
- undescribed Nacaduba species
- Zizina labradus – common grass-blue
- Zizina otis – blue butterfly

=== Nymphalidae ===
- Danaus plexippus – monarch butterfly
- Euploea lewinii perryi – crow butterfly
- Vagrans egista bowdenia – vagrant butterfly
- Hypolimnas bolina – blue-moon butterfly
- Junonia villida – Australian meadow-argus
- Melanitis leda solandra – evening brown

== Moths ==
=== Agonoxenidae ===
- Agonoxena argaula – coconut flat-moth

=== Alucitidae ===
- undescribed Alucita species

=== Arctiidae ===
- Argina astrea – crotalaria pod-borer
- Utetheisa pulchelloides – crimson-speckled footman

=== Carposinidae ===
- undescribed Peragrarchis species

=== Choreutidae ===
- Anthophila chalcotoxa
- undescribed Brenthia species – banyan jumping-moth
- undescribed Simaethis species

=== Cosmopterigidae ===
- undescribed Asymphorodes species
- Cosmopterix melanarches
- Cosmopterix attenuatella
- Iressa neoleuca
- Labdia dicyanitis
- undescribed Labdia species – orange-with-navy moth
- Pisistrata trypheropa
- Pyroderces aellotricha
- Pyroderces incertulella
- Trissodoris honorariella – pandanus hole-cutter moth

=== Crambidae ===
- Cnaphalocrocis medinalis – rice leafroller
- Cnaphalocrocis poeyalis – lesser rice-leafroller
- Cnaphalocrocis suspicalis
- undescribed Diplopseustis or Sufetula species
- Eurrhypodes tricoloralis
- Glyphodes multilinealis – fig tiger-moth
- Herpetogramma licarsisalis – tropical grass-moth
- Maruca vitrata – bean-pod borer
- Omiodes diemenalis – bean leafroller
- Parotis suralis
- Piletocera fluctualis
- 2 undescribed Prophantis species
- Sameodes cancellalis
- undescribed Scoparia species
- Stemorrhages oceanitis – emerald crambus
- Tatobotys biannulalis

=== Gelechiidae ===
- undescribed Idiophantis species
- Pectinophora gossypiella – bollworm
- Phthorimaea operculella – potato tuberworm
- Stoeberhinus testaceus – gelechiid moth
- undescribed Thiotricha species

=== Geometridae ===
- Anisodes samoana
- undescribed Anisodes species
- undescribed Chloroclystis species
- Cleora stenoglypta – variable moth
- Gymnoscelis concinna
- Gymnoscelis imparatalis – flower-looper moth
- 2 undescribed Gymnoscelis species
- Thalassodes pilaria – big emerald
- Ziridava dysorga

=== Gracillariidae ===
- Caloptilia hilaropis – glochidion miner
- undescribed Conopomorpha species
- Ketapangia regulifera
- Macarostola pontificalis
- undescribed Stomphastis species

=== Hyblaeidae ===
- Hyblaea puera – teak defoliator

=== Immidae ===
- undescribed Imma species

=== Noctuidae ===
- Achaea janata – castor-oil moth
- Achaea serva
- Aedia leucomelas – eastern alchymist
- Agrotis ipsilon aneituma – greasy cutworm
- Amyna axis
- Amyna natalis
- Anomis flava – cotton semi-looper
- Anomis involuta – hibiscus cutworm
- Anomis nigritarsis
- Anticarsia irrorata – owl moth
- Athetis nonagrica
- Avatha discolor
- Bombotelia jocosatrix – mango moth
- Callopistria maillardi
- Chasmina candida
- Chasmina tibialis – satin moth
- Chrysodeixis acuta – tomato semi-looper
- Chrysodeixis eriosoma – southern silver-Y moth
- Chrysodeixis illuminata
- Condica illecta
- Dysgonia arctotaenia
- Dysgonia prisca – fruit-piercing moth
- Earias huegeliana – rough bollworm
- Earias perhuegeli – rough bollworm
- Eublemma cochylioides
- Eublemma crassiuscula
- Eudocima fullonia – fruit-piercing moth
- Heliothis assulta – tipworm
- Hydrillodes melanozona – litter moth
- Hypena gonospilalis
- Hypena laceratalis – lantana hypena
- Hypena longfieldae
- Hypena masurialis
- Hypocala deflorata
- Lacera noctilio
- Leucania loreyi – nightfeeding sugarcane armyworm
- Leucania stenographa – sugarcane armyworm
- Lucera oculalis
- Maliattha ritsemae
- Mocis frugalis – sugarcane looper
- Mocis trifasciata
- undescribed Mythimna species
- undescribed Nigramma species
- Nola insularum
- Ophiusa coronata
- Polydesma boarmioides
- Rhesalides curvata
- Simplicia caeneusalis
- Spodoptera litura – tropical armyworm
- Spodoptera mauritia – tropical-grass armyworm
- Tiracola plagiata – cacao armyworm

=== Plutellidae ===
- Plutella xylostella – diamondback moth
- undescribed Terthroptera species

=== Pterophoridae ===
- Exelastis pumilio
- undescribed Platyptilia species
- Sphenarches anisodactylus – tropical featherwing

=== Pyralidae ===
- Crocidolomia pavonana – cabbage cluster-caterpillar
- Cryptoblabes plagioleuca – mango-flower moth
- Diaphania indica – cucumber moth
- Endotricha mesenterialis
- Etiella grisea – tropical legume-pod-borer
- undescribed Eudonia or Sufetula species
- Eurhodope ardescens – false blossum-moth
- Hellula undalis – cabbage-centre grub
- Hydriris ornatalis – kumara skeletoniser
- Hymenia recurvalis – beetworm moth
- undescribed Phycitinae species
- Tirathaba rufivena – coconut spiked-moth

=== Sphingidae ===
- Agrius convolvuli – sweet-potato hawkmoth
- Gnathothlibus erotus – white-brow hawkmoth
- Hippotion celerio – taro hawkmoth
- Hippotion velox
- Macroglossum hirundo – hummingbird hawkmoth

=== Stathmopodidae ===
- undescribed Calicotis species – fern-sori moth

=== Thyrididae ===
- Rhodoneura sericatalis – Terminalia cone-maker

=== Tineidae ===
- Erechthias flavistriata – sugarcane budmoth
- Erechthias pelotricha
- Erechthias psammaula – brown-stripe moth
- Erechthias simulans
- Erechthias sphenacma
- 2 undescribed Erechthias species
- Opogona aurisquamosa
- Opogona regressa
- Opogona trissostacta
- Trachycentra calamias
- Trachycentra chlorogramma
- undescribed Trachycentra species

=== Tortricidae ===
- Bactra litigatrix
- undescribed Bactra species
- Cryptophlebia pallifimbriata – fruit borer
- Cryptophlebia rhynchias
- Dudua aprobola – leaf-curling moth
- Heleanna physaloides
- Strepsicrates holotephras (Meyrick, 1924)
- Tritopterna galena

=== Yponomeutidae ===
- Prays parilis – citrus-blossom moth
- undescribed Prays species
