= Rodea =

Rodea may refer to:

- Rodea, protagonist of 2015 video game Rodea the Sky Soldier
- Eugenio López Rodea (1934–2022), founder of the beverage company Jumex
- Rodea, a tributary of Pamplonita River, in Norte de Santander, Colombia

== See also ==
- Peragrarchis rodea, a species of moth
