= Udea tetragramma =

Scientific classification
- Kingdom: Animalia
- Phylum: Arthropoda
- Class: Insecta
- Order: Lepidoptera
- Family: Crambidae
- Subfamily: Spilomelinae
- Tribe: Udeini
- Genus: Udea
- Species: U. tetragramma

Binomial name
- Udea tetragramma (J. F. G. Clarke, 1965)

Synonyms
- Mnesictena tetragramma J. F. G. Clarke, 1965

Species of moth

Udea tetragramma is a species of moth in the subfamily Spilomelinae of the family Crambidae. It was described by John Frederick Gates Clarke in 1965 based on specimens collected on the Juan Fernandez Islands, an archipelago in the South Pacific Ocean and part of Insular Chile. The species is also found on Rapa Nui, where it has been accidentally introduced.

The wingspan is 17–18 mm. The forewings are fuscous, strongly overlaid with ferruginous. There is a straight, transverse, ill-defined, fuscous line at two-fifths of the costa, extending to the dorsum at the basal third. From the apical sixth of the costa extends a transverse, ill-defined line to vein 2, then along vein 2 to the cell, then diagonally, outwardly and then straight to the dorsum at the outer two-thirds. There are three small white dots in the cell, preceded and followed by blackish-fuscous scales. There are also four ochreous-tawny spots on the outer half of the costa, alternating with suffused shades of blackish fuscous. On the termen, there are seven small, ill-defined blackish-fuscous dots. The hindwings are greyish fuscous. On the discocellulars and the bases of veins 6 and 8 there is a black spot preceded by a whitish area of the wing. From the apical fourth of the costa there is an irregular blackish-fuscous line, extending to the anal veins.

The species was originally described as Mnesictena tetragramma, but was later transferred to the genus Udea.
