= Peragrarchis emmilta =

Scientific classification
- Kingdom: Animalia
- Phylum: Arthropoda
- Clade: Pancrustacea
- Class: Insecta
- Order: Lepidoptera
- Family: Carposinidae
- Genus: Peragrarchis
- Species: P. emmilta

Binomial name
- Peragrarchis emmilta Diakonoff, 1989

Synonyms
- Peragrarchis martirea Bippus

Species of moth

Peragrarchis emmilta is a moth in the family Carposinidae. It is found in China (Kwangtung) and on Réunion island.

This species has a winglength of 8mm.
