= Asymphorodes dimorpha =

Scientific classification
- Kingdom: Animalia
- Phylum: Arthropoda
- Clade: Pancrustacea
- Class: Insecta
- Order: Lepidoptera
- Family: Cosmopterigidae
- Genus: Asymphorodes
- Species: A. dimorpha

Binomial name
- Asymphorodes dimorpha (Busck, 1914)

Synonyms
- Petrochroa dimorpha Busck, 1914

Species of moth

Asymphorodes dimorpha is a species of gelechioid moth of subfamily Agonoxeninae of the palm moth family (Agonoxenidae), whose taxonomic status is disputed. Alternatively, the palm moths might be a subfamily of the grass-miner moth family (Elachistidae), with the Agonoxeninae becoming a tribe Agonoxenini.

Formerly, this genus was included in the cosmet moths (Cosmopterigidae). It is found in Niihau, Kauai, Oahu, Molokai, Maui, Lanai, Hawaii, Nīhoa, Necker Island, Pearl and Hermes Atoll, Midway Atoll, Kure Atoll, Wake Island, Kanton Island and Jarvis Island, but is probably much more widely distributed in the Pacific.
