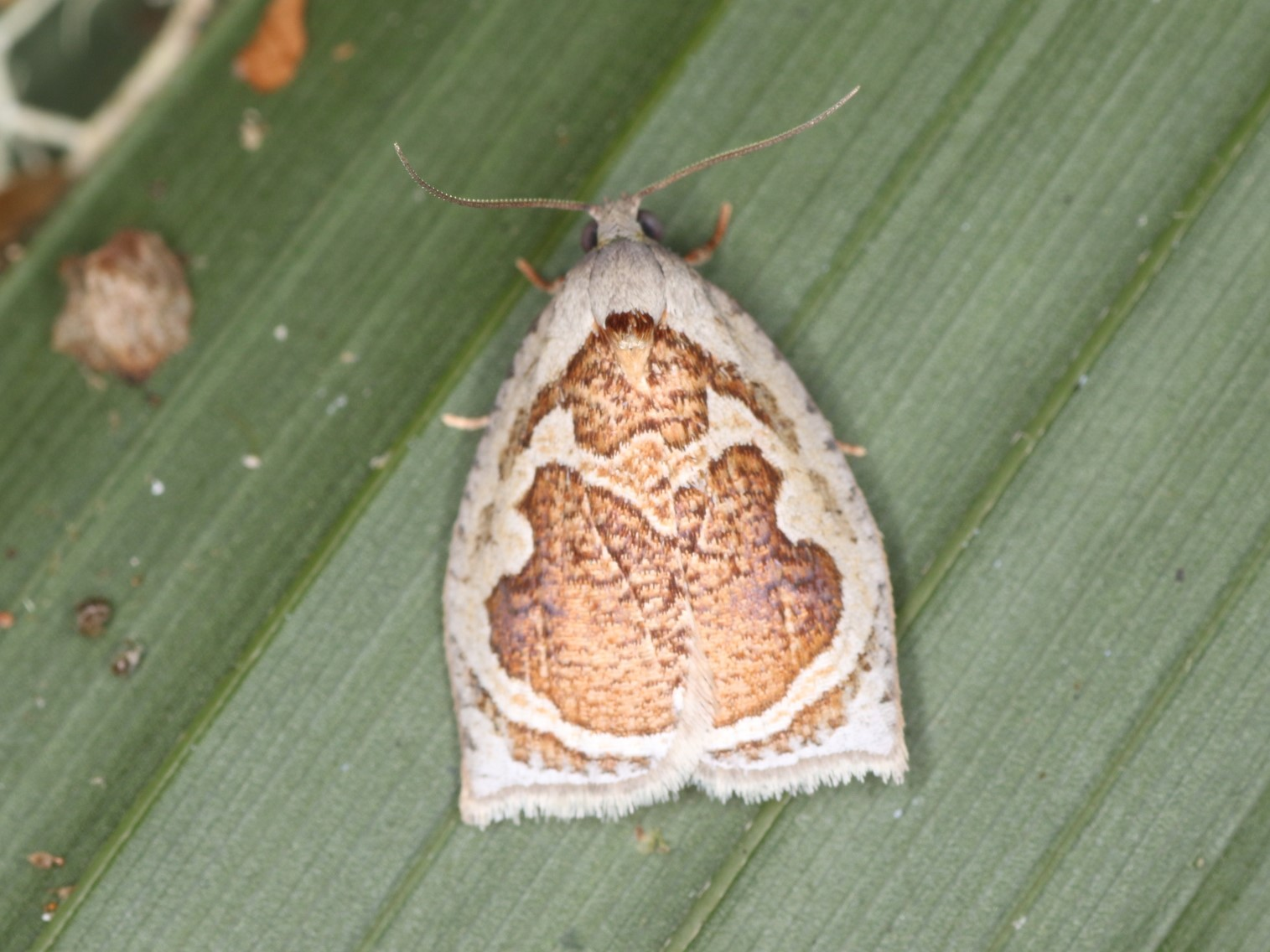

Scientific classification
- Domain: Eukaryota
- Kingdom: Animalia
- Phylum: Arthropoda
- Class: Insecta
- Order: Lepidoptera
- Family: Tortricidae
- Genus: Pseudomeritastis
- Species: Pseudomeritastis

Binomial name
- Pseudomeritastis Obraztsov, 1966

= Pseudomeritastis =

Genus of tortrix moths

Pseudomeritastis is a genus of moths in the subfamily Tortricinae.

== Species ==
- Pseudomeritastis clarkei Obraztsov, 1966
- Pseudomeritastis cordigera (Walsingham, 1914)
- Pseudomeritastis decora Obraztsov, 1966
- Pseudomeritastis distincta Obraztsov, 1966
- Pseudomeritastis emphanes Razowski, 2004
- Pseudomeritastis heliadelpha (Meyrick, 1932)
- Pseudomeritastis orphnoxantha Obraztsov, 1966
- Pseudomeritastis quieta Razowski & Wojtusiak, 2010
- Pseudomeritastis voluta (Meyrick, 1912)

== See also ==
- List of Tortricidae genera
