= Dichelopa phalaranthes =

Scientific classification
- Kingdom: Animalia
- Phylum: Arthropoda
- Class: Insecta
- Order: Lepidoptera
- Family: Tortricidae
- Genus: Dichelopa
- Species: D. phalaranthes

Binomial name
- Dichelopa phalaranthes Meyrick, 1934

Species of moth

Dichelopa phalaranthes is a species of moth of the family Tortricidae. It is endemic to the Marquesas Archipelago in French Polynesia. It is known from Hiva Oa (type locality: Kaava Ridge at 750 m (2,460 ft) above sea level) and Nuku Hiva.

The wingspan is 10–17 mm (0.39–0.67 in) for females.

== Subspecies ==
J. F. Gates Clarke described new specimens from Nuku Hiva in 1986 as a new subspecies, thus recognizing the following subspecies:

- Dichelopa phalaranthes aporrhegma Clarke, 1986 (Marquesas Archipelago: Nuku Hiva)
- Dichelopa phalaranthes phalaranthes (Marquesas Archipelago: Hiva Oa)

However, the World Catalogue of the Tortricidae (2018) does not recognize these subspecies, considering Dichelopa phalaranthes aporrhegma a synonym of Dichelopa phalaranthes.
