= Ernophthora phoenicias =

Scientific classification
- Kingdom: Animalia
- Phylum: Arthropoda
- Class: Insecta
- Order: Lepidoptera
- Family: Pyralidae
- Genus: Ernophthora
- Species: E. phoenicias

Binomial name
- Ernophthora phoenicias Meyrick, 1887

Synonyms
- Mimistis actiosoides Hampson, 1896

Species of moth

Ernophthora phoenicias is a species of snout moth in the genus Ernophthora. It was described by Edward Meyrick in 1887, and is known from Australia.
