= Idioblasta =

Scientific classification
- Domain: Eukaryota
- Kingdom: Animalia
- Phylum: Arthropoda
- Class: Insecta
- Order: Lepidoptera
- Family: Crambidae
- Subfamily: Crambinae
- Tribe: incertae sedis
- Genus: Idioblasta; Warren, 1891

Genus of moths

Idioblasta is a genus of moths of the family Crambidae.

== Species ==
- Idioblasta acleropa (Meyrick, 1935)
- Idioblasta isoterma (Meyrick, 1935)
- Idioblasta lacteata Warren, 1891
- Idioblasta procellaris (Meyrick, 1935)
