= Pseudomeritastis emphanes =

Scientific classification
- Kingdom: Animalia
- Phylum: Arthropoda
- Class: Insecta
- Order: Lepidoptera
- Family: Tortricidae
- Genus: Pseudomeritastis
- Species: P. emphanes

Binomial name
- Pseudomeritastis emphanes Razowski, 2004

Species of moth

Pseudomeritastis emphanes is a species of moth of the family Tortricidae. It is found in Pichincha Province, Ecuador.

The wingspan is about 18 mm.
