= Asymphorodes sericeus =

Scientific classification
- Kingdom: Animalia
- Phylum: Arthropoda
- Clade: Pancrustacea
- Class: Insecta
- Order: Lepidoptera
- Family: Cosmopterigidae
- Genus: Asymphorodes
- Species: A. sericeus

Binomial name
- Asymphorodes sericeus J. F. G. Clarke, 1986

Species of moth

Asymphorodes sericeus is a moth of the family Cosmopterigidae. It was described by John Frederick Gates Clarke in 1986. It is found on Nuku Hiva (Marquesas Islands, French Polynesia).

The wingspan is 8–10 mm (0.31–0.39 in). Coloration is off white, typically with some spots, although females are often immaculate.
