= Peragrarchis minima =

Scientific classification
- Domain: Eukaryota
- Kingdom: Animalia
- Phylum: Arthropoda
- Class: Insecta
- Order: Lepidoptera
- Family: Carposinidae
- Genus: Peragrarchis
- Species: P. minima

Binomial name
- Peragrarchis minima Bradley, 1962

Species of moth

Peragrarchis minima is a moth in the family Carposinidae. It is found on the New Hebrides.
