= Ernophthora iospila =

Scientific classification
- Domain: Eukaryota
- Kingdom: Animalia
- Phylum: Arthropoda
- Class: Insecta
- Order: Lepidoptera
- Family: Pyralidae
- Genus: Ernophthora
- Species: E. iospila

Binomial name
- Ernophthora iospila Clarke, 1986

Species of moth

Ernophthora iospila is a species of snout moth in the genus Ernophthora. It was described by Clarke in 1986. It is found on the Marquesas Archipelago.
