= Pseudomeritastis cordigera =

Scientific classification
- Domain: Eukaryota
- Kingdom: Animalia
- Phylum: Arthropoda
- Class: Insecta
- Order: Lepidoptera
- Family: Tortricidae
- Genus: Pseudomeritastis
- Species: P. cordigera

Binomial name
- Pseudomeritastis cordigera (Walsingham, 1914)

Synonyms
- Tortrix cordigera Walsingham, 1914

Species of moth

Pseudomeritastis cordigera is a species of moth of the family Tortricidae. It is found in Panama and Guatemala.
