= Asymphorodes spodogramma =

Scientific classification
- Kingdom: Animalia
- Phylum: Arthropoda
- Clade: Pancrustacea
- Class: Insecta
- Order: Lepidoptera
- Family: Cosmopterigidae
- Genus: Asymphorodes
- Species: A. spodogramma

Binomial name
- Asymphorodes spodogramma J. F. G. Clarke, 1986

Species of moth

Asymphorodes spodogramma is a moth of the family Cosmopterigidae. It was described by John Frederick Gates Clarke in 1986. It is found on Hiva Oa in the Marquesas Islands (French Polynesia).

The wingspan is 6–7 mm (0.24–0.28 in). The forewings are cream white and the hindwings are whitish.
