= Iressa (moth) =

Scientific classification
- Kingdom: Animalia
- Phylum: Arthropoda
- Clade: Pancrustacea
- Class: Insecta
- Order: Lepidoptera
- Family: Cosmopterigidae
- Subfamily: Cosmopteriginae
- Genus: Iressa; J.F.G.Clarke, 1971

Genus of moths

Iressa is a genus of cosmet moths (family Cosmopterigidae). It belongs to subfamily Cosmopteriginae.

They are characterized mainly by their wing venation: in the forewings, vein 1b is not forked and veins 2-4 are separate, while veins 6-8 are not; veins 6 and 7 are stalked and arise from vein 8. In addition, the scape is short and bears a comb.

This genus contains only 3 known species:

- Iressa microsema J.F.G.Clarke, 1986
- Iressa neoleuca J.F.G.Clarke, 1971
- Iressa triformis (Meyrick 1927)
