= Ernophthora milicha =

Scientific classification
- Domain: Eukaryota
- Kingdom: Animalia
- Phylum: Arthropoda
- Class: Insecta
- Order: Lepidoptera
- Family: Pyralidae
- Genus: Ernophthora
- Species: E. milicha

Binomial name
- Ernophthora milicha Turner, 1931

Species of moth

Ernophthora milicha is a species of snout moth in the genus Ernophthora. It was described by Turner in 1931, and is known from Australia.
