= Pseudomeritastis decora =

Scientific classification
- Domain: Eukaryota
- Kingdom: Animalia
- Phylum: Arthropoda
- Class: Insecta
- Order: Lepidoptera
- Family: Tortricidae
- Genus: Pseudomeritastis
- Species: P. decora

Binomial name
- Pseudomeritastis decora Obraztsov, 1966

Species of moth

Pseudomeritastis decora is a species of moth of the family Tortricidae. It is found in Bolivia.

The length of the forewings is about 10 mm. The forewings are light grey with ferruginous-brown markings, edged and in part transversely strigulated (finely streaked) with dark brown. The hindwings are white and slightly creamy.
