= Ernophthora =

Scientific classification
- Kingdom: Animalia
- Phylum: Arthropoda
- Clade: Pancrustacea
- Class: Insecta
- Order: Lepidoptera
- Family: Pyralidae
- Subfamily: Phycitinae
- Genus: Ernophthora; Meyrick, 1887

Type species
- Ernophthora phoenicias Meyrick, 1887

Synonyms
- Aspithra Ragonot, 1888; Emophthora (lapsus); Mimistis Hampson, 1896

Genus of moths

Ernophthora is a genus of small moths belonging to the snout moth family (Pyralidae). They form part of the Cabniini, a rather small tribe of the huge snout moth subfamily Phycitinae. This genus is generally found in the Australia-Pacific region.

These moths are remarkable for their ability to colonize oceanic islands. Numerous species occur as far offshore as the Marquesas Islands. Members of this genus can usually be distinguished from relatives by their 10-veined forewings, with veins 4 and 7 completely absent.

Ernophthora caterpillars eat living and sometimes dead leaves, which they also spin together with webbing to hide. The food plants of this genus are not too well known, but appear to be limited by availability rather than being restricted to a particular lineage of plants; recorded are for example Bidens (beggarticks) and Vaccinium (blueberries and relatives), which are both asterids but otherwise unrelated.

== Selected species ==
Species of Ernophthora include:

- Ernophthora aphanoptera Clarke, 1986
- Ernophthora chrysura (Meyrick, 1929) (tentatively placed here)
- Ernophthora denticornis (Meyrick, 1929)
- Ernophthora dryinandra (Meyrick, 1929)
- Ernophthora iospila Clarke, 1986
- Ernophthora lechriogramma Clarke, 1986
- Ernophthora maculicostella (Ragonot, 1888)
- Ernophthora milicha Turner, 1931
- Ernophthora palassoptera Clarke, 1986
- Ernophthora phoenicias Meyrick, 1887
- Ernophthora schematica (Turner, 1947)
