= Pseudomeritastis quieta =

Scientific classification
- Domain: Eukaryota
- Kingdom: Animalia
- Phylum: Arthropoda
- Class: Insecta
- Order: Lepidoptera
- Family: Tortricidae
- Genus: Pseudomeritastis
- Species: P. quieta

Binomial name
- Pseudomeritastis quieta Razowski & Wojtusiak, 2010

Species of moth

Pseudomeritastis quieta is a species of moth of the family Tortricidae. It is found in Peru.

The wingspan is about 25 mm.
