= Ernophthora lechriogramma =

Scientific classification
- Domain: Eukaryota
- Kingdom: Animalia
- Phylum: Arthropoda
- Class: Insecta
- Order: Lepidoptera
- Family: Pyralidae
- Genus: Ernophthora
- Species: E. lechriogramma

Binomial name
- Ernophthora lechriogramma Clarke, 1986

Species of moth

Ernophthora lechriogramma is a species of snout moth in the genus Ernophthora. It was described by Clarke in 1986. It is found on the Marquesas Archipelago.
