= Pseudomeritastis voluta =

Scientific classification
- Kingdom: Animalia
- Phylum: Arthropoda
- Class: Insecta
- Order: Lepidoptera
- Family: Tortricidae
- Genus: Pseudomeritastis
- Species: P. voluta

Binomial name
- Pseudomeritastis voluta (Meyrick, 1912)

Synonyms
- Meritastis voluta Meyrick, 1912

Species of moth

Pseudomeritastis voluta is a species of moth of the family Tortricidae. It is found in Colombia.
