= Asymphorodes trigrapha =

Scientific classification
- Kingdom: Animalia
- Phylum: Arthropoda
- Clade: Pancrustacea
- Class: Insecta
- Order: Lepidoptera
- Family: Cosmopterigidae
- Genus: Asymphorodes
- Species: A. trigrapha

Binomial name
- Asymphorodes trigrapha J. F. G. Clarke, 1986

Species of moth

Asymphorodes trigrapha is a moth of the family Cosmopterigidae. It was described by John Frederick Gates Clarke in 1986. It is found on Nuku Hiva in the Marquesas Islands (French Polynesia).

The wingspan is 13 mm (0.51 in). The forewings are fuscous and the hindwings are grayish fuscous.
