= Asymphorodes aporema =

Scientific classification
- Kingdom: Animalia
- Phylum: Arthropoda
- Clade: Pancrustacea
- Class: Insecta
- Order: Lepidoptera
- Family: Cosmopterigidae
- Genus: Asymphorodes
- Species: A. aporema

Binomial name
- Asymphorodes aporema Clarke, 1987

Species of moth

Asymphorodes aporema is a moth of the family Agonoxenidae. It is found on Guam.
