= Pseudomeritastis heliadelpha =

Scientific classification
- Kingdom: Animalia
- Phylum: Arthropoda
- Class: Insecta
- Order: Lepidoptera
- Family: Tortricidae
- Genus: Pseudomeritastis
- Species: P. heliadelpha

Binomial name
- Pseudomeritastis heliadelpha (Meyrick, 1932)

Synonyms
- Meritastis heliadelpha Meyrick, 1932

Species of moth

Pseudomeritastis heliadelpha is a species of moth of the family Tortricidae. It is found in Bolivia.
