= Iressa triformis =

Scientific classification
- Kingdom: Animalia
- Phylum: Arthropoda
- Class: Insecta
- Order: Lepidoptera
- Family: Cosmopterigidae
- Genus: Iressa
- Species: I. triformis

Binomial name
- Iressa triformis (Meyrick, 1927)

Synonyms
- Labdia triformis Meyrick, 1927

Species of moth

Iressa triformis is a moth in the family Cosmopterigidae. It is found on Samoa.
