= Peragrarchis syncolleta =

Scientific classification
- Kingdom: Animalia
- Phylum: Arthropoda
- Clade: Pancrustacea
- Class: Insecta
- Order: Lepidoptera
- Family: Carposinidae
- Genus: Peragrarchis
- Species: P. syncolleta

Binomial name
- Peragrarchis syncolleta (Meyrick, 1928)

Synonyms
- Meridarchis syncolleta Meyrick, 1928

Species of moth

Peragrarchis syncolleta is a moth in the family Carposinidae. It is found in India (Andaman Islands), Japan and Cook Islands.
