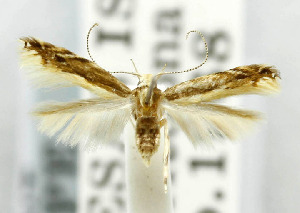

Scientific classification
- Kingdom: Animalia
- Phylum: Arthropoda
- Clade: Pancrustacea
- Class: Insecta
- Order: Lepidoptera
- Family: Cosmopterigidae
- Genus: Asymphorodes
- Species: A. trichogramma

Binomial name
- Asymphorodes trichogramma J. F. G. Clarke, 1986

= Asymphorodes trichogramma =

Species of moth

Asymphorodes trichogramma is a moth of the family Cosmopterigidae. It was described by John Frederick Gates Clarke in 1986. It is found on Hiva Oa, Fatu Hiva in the Marquesas Islands (French Polynesia) and in Easter Island.

The wingspan is 7–9 mm (0.28–0.35 in). The forewings are buffy brown and the hindwings are light gray.
