= Asymphorodes =

Scientific classification
- Kingdom: Animalia
- Phylum: Arthropoda
- Clade: Pancrustacea
- Class: Insecta
- Order: Lepidoptera
- Family: Cosmopterigidae
- Genus: Asymphorodes; Meyrick, 1929

Type species
- Asymphorodes valligera Meyrick, 1929

Diversity
- Some 80 species

Genus of insects

Asymphorodes is a genus in the subfamily Cosmopteriginae of the cosmet moth family (Cosmopterigidae). It is placed here based on the presence of pleural lobes on the 8th sternite of the males, which is an apomorphy for the cosmet family. Asymphorodes are found in southern Polynesia as well as the Hawaiian and the Solomon Islands, and are notable for their adaptive radiation on the Marquesas Islands.

== Description ==
These small moths come in a diverse range of more or less subdued colors and in their natural range can usually be distinguished by their wing venation: In the forewings, vein 1b is forked and vein 1c missing; veins 2 and 3 neither run parallel nor approach at the end, and vein 5 does not emerge from a common stalk with veins 6-8. In addition, like in some related moths the scape is short and bears a comb.

The vinculum is variously developed and the valvae thus attach variously far from the tegumen, though often quite closely. The gnathos is typically two-armed, but one of the arms may be underdeveloped or even missing altogether. The right manica is vestigial or missing, while the left one is set tightly against the aedeagus. Most characteristically though, the eighth sternal and fourth to seventh abdominal segments are modified, the former forming epitygmata ("genital flaps"). Like in some related moths, the males also have a tuft of hairs on the hindwing underside, which can be folded into a pocket in the wing cell. The uncus (in males) and signum (in females) are usually absent. As regards other features of the female genitals, the ovipositor is long while the ostium is usually well sclerotized and protrudes, but may be recessed into a deep pit in the seventh sternal segment.

== Species ==
Species of Asymphorodes include:

- Asymphorodes acerba Meyrick, 1929
- Asymphorodes acritopterus J.F.G. Clarke, 1986
- Asymphorodes acrophrictis Meyrick, 1934
- Asymphorodes admirandus Meyrick, 1934
- Asymphorodes adynatus J.F.G. Clarke, 1986
- Asymphorodes aenigma J.F.G. Clarke, 1986
- Asymphorodes albicoma J.F.G. Clarke, 1986
- Asymphorodes amblysoma J.F.G. Clarke, 1986
- Asymphorodes aporema J.F.G. Clarke, 1987
- Asymphorodes aporia J.F.G. Clarke, 1986
- Asymphorodes astathopis (Meyrick, 1934) (formerly in Limnaecia)
- Asymphorodes balanotis Meyrick, 1934
- Asymphorodes bipunctatus J.F.G. Clarke, 1986
- Asymphorodes brevimacula J.F.G. Clarke, 1986
- Asymphorodes canicoma J.F.G. Clarke, 1986
- Asymphorodes chalcocoma J.F.G. Clarke, 1986
- Asymphorodes chalcopterus J.F.G. Clarke, 1986
- Asymphorodes chalcosoma J.F.G. Clarke, 1986
- Asymphorodes chalcozona
- Asymphorodes chrysophanes J.F.G. Clarke, 1986
- Asymphorodes cicatricula J.F.G. Clarke, 1986
- Asymphorodes circopis Meyrick, 1929
- Asymphorodes cirsodes Meyrick, 1929
- Asymphorodes coesyrias Meyrick, 1929
- Asymphorodes culminis J.F.G. Clarke, 1986
- Asymphorodes cuneatus J.F.G. Clarke, 1986
- Asymphorodes diamphidius J.F.G. Clarke, 1986
- Asymphorodes didyma J.F.G. Clarke, 1986
- Asymphorodes diffidentia J.F.G. Clarke, 1986
- Asymphorodes dimorpha (Busck, 1914)
- Asymphorodes emphereia J.F.G. Clarke, 1986
- Asymphorodes ergodes Meyrick, 1934
- Asymphorodes favilla J.F.G. Clarke, 1986
- Asymphorodes flexa (Meyrick, 1921)
- Asymphorodes fractura J.F.G. Clarke, 1986
- Asymphorodes hemileucus J.F.G. Clarke, 1986
- Asymphorodes holoporphyra Meyrick, 1934
- Asymphorodes homosoma J.F.G. Clarke, 1986
- Asymphorodes honoria J.F.G.Clarke, 1986
- Asymphorodes hypostema J.F.G. Clarke, 1986
- Asymphorodes interstincta Meyrick, 1929 (may include A. poliopterus)
- Asymphorodes lenticula J.F.G. Clarke, 1986
- Asymphorodes leptotes J.F.G. Clarke, 1986
- Asymphorodes leucoloma J.F.G. Clarke, 1986
- Asymphorodes leucoterma Meyrick, 1929
- Asymphorodes lucerna J.F.G. Clarke, 1986
- Asymphorodes lucidus J.F.G. Clarke, 1986
- Asymphorodes macrogramma J.F.G. Clarke, 1986
- Asymphorodes mediostriatus J.F.G. Clarke, 1986
- Asymphorodes melanosoma J.F.G. Clarke, 1986
- Asymphorodes mesoxanthus J.F.G.Clarke, 1986
- Asymphorodes monoxesta
- Asymphorodes montgomeryi J.F.G. Clarke, 1986
- Asymphorodes myronotus Meyrick, 1929
- Asymphorodes nebrias J.F.G. Clarke, 1986
- Asymphorodes nephocirca Meyrick, 1929
- Asymphorodes nigricornis J.F.G. Clarke, 1986
- Asymphorodes nuciferae J.F.G. Clarke, 1986
- Asymphorodes ochrogramma J.F.G. Clarke, 1986
- Asymphorodes oculisignis Meyrick, 1934
- Asymphorodes paraporia J.F.G. Clarke, 1986
- Asymphorodes phaeochorda Meyrick, 1929
- Asymphorodes phaeodelta J.F.G. Clarke, 1986
- Asymphorodes phalarogramma J.F.G. Clarke, 1986
- Asymphorodes plectographa Meyrick, 1929
- Asymphorodes plemmelia J.F.G. Clarke, 1986
- Asymphorodes poliopterus J.F.G. Clarke, 1986 (may belong in A. interstincta)
- Asymphorodes pollutus Meyrick, 1929
- Asymphorodes porphyrarcha Meyrick, 1929 (= A. xestophanes)
- Asymphorodes regina J.F.G. Clarke, 1986
- Asymphorodes remigiata J.F.G. Clarke, 1986
- Asymphorodes semileuteus J.F.G. Clarke, 1986
- Asymphorodes seminiger J.F.G. Clarke, 1986
- Asymphorodes sericeus J.F.G. Clarke, 1986
- Asymphorodes sphenocopa Meyrick, 1929
- Asymphorodes spintheropus (Meyrick, 1934) (formerly in Stagmatophora)
- Asymphorodes spodogramma J.F.G. Clarke, 1986
- Asymphorodes triaula (Meyrick, 1935)
- Asymphorodes trichogramma J.F.G. Clarke, 1986
- Asymphorodes trigrapha J.F.G. Clarke, 1986
- Asymphorodes valligera Meyrick, 1929 (= A. ingravescens)
- Asymphorodes xanthostola Meyrick, 1934
