= Ernophthora schematica =

Scientific classification
- Domain: Eukaryota
- Kingdom: Animalia
- Phylum: Arthropoda
- Class: Insecta
- Order: Lepidoptera
- Family: Pyralidae
- Genus: Ernophthora
- Species: E. schematica

Binomial name
- Ernophthora schematica (Turner, 1947)

Synonyms
- Euzopherodes schematica Turner, 1947

Species of moth

Ernophthora schematica is a species of snout moth in the genus Ernophthora. It was described by Alfred Jefferis Turner in 1947 and is found in Australia.
