= Pseudomeritastis orphnoxantha =

Scientific classification
- Domain: Eukaryota
- Kingdom: Animalia
- Phylum: Arthropoda
- Class: Insecta
- Order: Lepidoptera
- Family: Tortricidae
- Genus: Pseudomeritastis
- Species: P. orphnoxantha

Binomial name
- Pseudomeritastis orphnoxantha Obraztsov, 1966

Species of moth

Pseudomeritastis orphnoxantha is a species of moth of the family Tortricidae. It is found in Costa Rica.

The length of the forewings is about 8.5 mm. The forewings are light grey with brownish-ferruginous markings, edged and in part transversally strigulated (finely streaked) with dark brown. The hindwings are dark ferruginous.

== Etymology ==
The species name is derived from the Greek words for dark and yellow.
