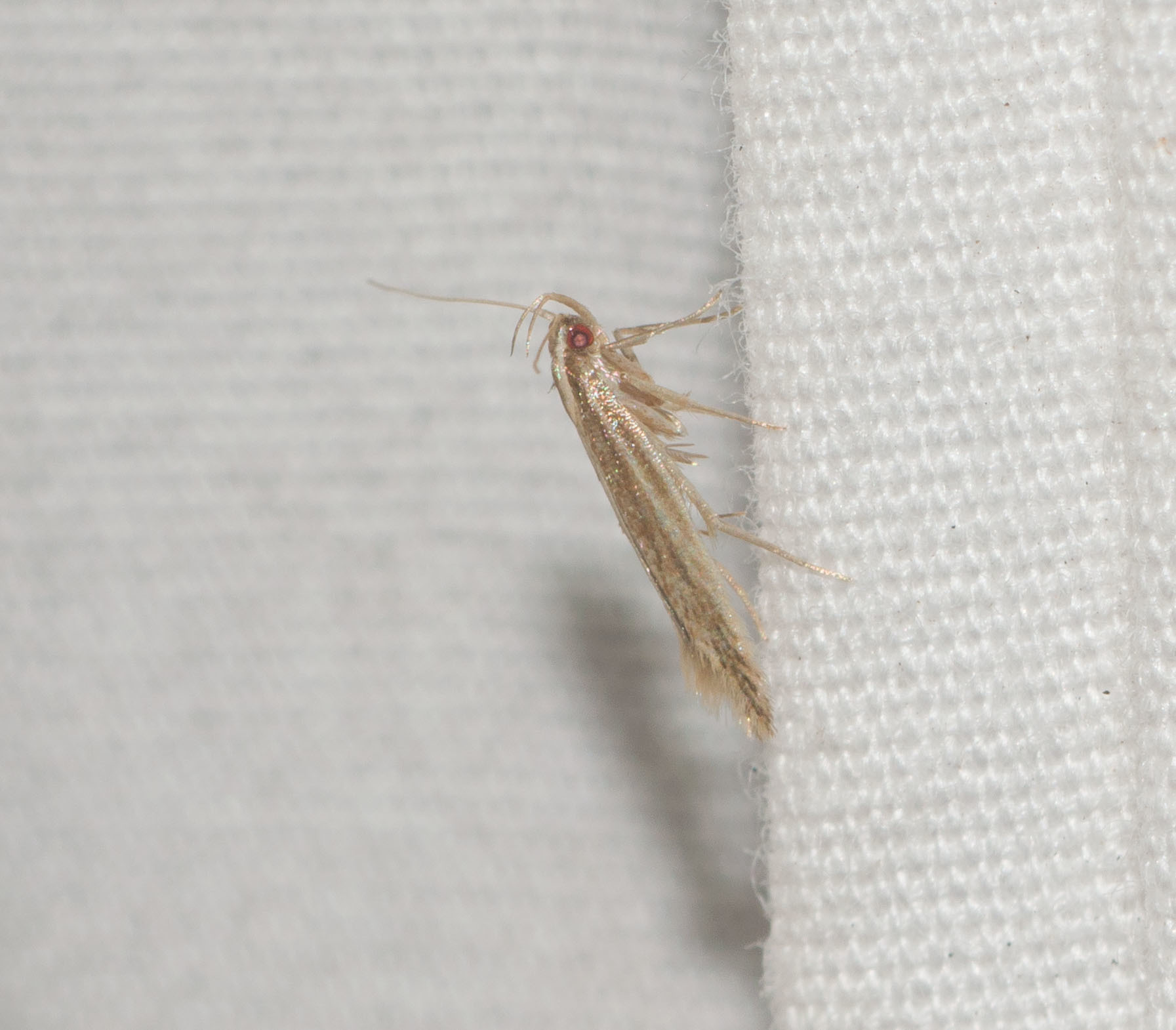

Scientific classification
- Kingdom: Animalia
- Phylum: Arthropoda
- Clade: Pancrustacea
- Class: Insecta
- Order: Lepidoptera
- Family: Cosmopterigidae
- Genus: Asymphorodes
- Species: A. triaula

Binomial name
- Asymphorodes triaula (Meyrick, 1935)

Synonyms
- Aphthonetus triaula Meyrick, 1935

= Asymphorodes triaula =

Species of moth

Asymphorodes triaula is a species of gelechioid moth of subfamily Agonoxeninae of the palm moth family (Agonoxenidae), whose taxonomic status is disputed. Alternatively, the palm moths might be a subfamily of the grass-miner moth family (Elachistidae), with the Agonoxeninae becoming a tribe Agonoxenini.

Formerly, this genus was included in the cosmet moths (Cosmopterigidae). It was first described by Edward Meyrick in 1935. It is only known from the Hawaiian islands of Oahu and Hawaii.
