= Ernophthora denticornis =

Scientific classification
- Domain: Eukaryota
- Kingdom: Animalia
- Phylum: Arthropoda
- Class: Insecta
- Order: Lepidoptera
- Family: Pyralidae
- Genus: Ernophthora
- Species: E. denticornis

Binomial name
- Ernophthora denticornis (Meyrick, 1929)

Synonyms
- Aspithra denticornis Meyrick, 1929

Species of moth

Ernophthora denticornis is a species of snout moth in the genus Ernophthora. It was described by Edward Meyrick in 1929. It is found on the Marquesas Archipelago in French Polynesia, where it is known from the islands Hiva Oa, Nuku Hiva, Tahuata, Ua Pou and Fatu-Hiva.
