= Cosmopterix aphranassa =

Scientific classification
- Kingdom: Animalia
- Phylum: Arthropoda
- Class: Insecta
- Order: Lepidoptera
- Family: Cosmopterigidae
- Genus: Cosmopterix
- Species: C. aphranassa

Binomial name
- Cosmopterix aphranassa Meyrick, 1926

Synonyms
- Cosmopteryx aphranassa

Species of moth from French Polynesia

Cosmopterix aphranassa is a moth in the family Cosmopterigidae. It was described by Edward Meyrick in 1926. It is found on Rapa Iti.
