= Asymphorodes pollutus =

Scientific classification
- Kingdom: Animalia
- Phylum: Arthropoda
- Clade: Pancrustacea
- Class: Insecta
- Order: Lepidoptera
- Family: Cosmopterigidae
- Genus: Asymphorodes
- Species: A. pollutus

Binomial name
- Asymphorodes pollutus Meyrick, 1929

Synonyms
- Asymphorodes polluta Meyrick, 1929

Species of moth

Asymphorodes pollutus is a moth of the family Agonoxenidae. It was described by Edward Meyrick in 1929. It is found on the Marquesas Archipelago.
