= Eudonia chrysomicta =

Scientific classification
- Kingdom: Animalia
- Phylum: Arthropoda
- Class: Insecta
- Order: Lepidoptera
- Family: Crambidae
- Genus: Eudonia
- Species: E. chrysomicta

Binomial name
- Eudonia chrysomicta (Meyrick, 1929)

Synonyms
- Scoparia chrysomicta Meyrick, 1929; Scoparia commercialis Meyrick, 1929

Species of moth

Eudonia chrysomicta is a moth in the family Crambidae. It was described by Edward Meyrick in 1929. It is found on the Marquesas Archipelago in French Polynesia.
