= Ernophthora dryinandra =

Scientific classification
- Kingdom: Animalia
- Phylum: Arthropoda
- Class: Insecta
- Order: Lepidoptera
- Family: Pyralidae
- Genus: Ernophthora
- Species: E. dryinandra

Binomial name
- Ernophthora dryinandra (Meyrick, 1929)

Synonyms
- Aspithra dryinandra Meyrick, 1929

Species of moth

Ernophthora dryinandra is a species of snout moth in the genus Ernophthora. It was described by Edward Meyrick in 1929. It is found on the Marquesas Archipelago in French Polynesia.
