= Peragrarchis rodea =

Scientific classification
- Domain: Eukaryota
- Kingdom: Animalia
- Phylum: Arthropoda
- Class: Insecta
- Order: Lepidoptera
- Family: Carposinidae
- Genus: Peragrarchis
- Species: P. rodea

Binomial name
- Peragrarchis rodea (Diakonoff, 1950)

Synonyms
- Meridarchis rodea Diakonoff, 1950

Species of moth

Peragrarchis rodea is a moth in the family Carposinidae. It is found in New Guinea.
