= Peragrarchis =

Scientific classification
- Kingdom: Animalia
- Phylum: Arthropoda
- Class: Insecta
- Order: Lepidoptera
- Family: Carposinidae
- Genus: Peragrarchis; Diakonoff, 1959

Type species
- Peragrarchis rodea (Diakonoff, 1950)

Genus of moths

Peragrarchis is a genus of moths in the family Carposinidae.

== Species ==
- Peragrarchis emmilta Diakonoff, 1989
- Peragrarchis martirea Bippus, 2016
- Peragrarchis minima Bradley, 1962
- Peragrarchis pelograpta (Meyrick, 1929) (originally in Meridarchis)
- Peragrarchis rodea (Diakonoff, 1950) (originally in Meridarchis)
- Peragrarchis syncolleta (Meyrick, 1928) (originally in Meridarchis)
