= Scopula angusticallis =

Scientific classification
- Domain: Eukaryota
- Kingdom: Animalia
- Phylum: Arthropoda
- Class: Insecta
- Order: Lepidoptera
- Family: Geometridae
- Genus: Scopula
- Species: S. angusticallis

Binomial name
- Scopula angusticallis Prout, 1935

Species of geometer moth in subfamily Sterrhinae

Scopula angusticallis is a moth of the family Geometridae. It is found in the Marquesas Archipelago. It was described based on a single female from the summit of Tekohepu on Ua Pou at 980 m (3,200 ft) above sea level. The wingspan of this specimen, the holotype, is 23 mm (0.91 in).
