= Asymphorodes nuciferae =

Scientific classification
- Kingdom: Animalia
- Phylum: Arthropoda
- Clade: Pancrustacea
- Class: Insecta
- Order: Lepidoptera
- Family: Cosmopterigidae
- Genus: Asymphorodes
- Species: A. nuciferae

Binomial name
- Asymphorodes nuciferae J. F. G. Clarke, 1986

Species of moth

Asymphorodes nuciferae is a moth of the family Agonoxenidae. It was described by John Frederick Gates Clarke in 1986. It is found in French Polynesia.
