= Ernophthora maculicostella =

Scientific classification
- Domain: Eukaryota
- Kingdom: Animalia
- Phylum: Arthropoda
- Class: Insecta
- Order: Lepidoptera
- Family: Pyralidae
- Genus: Ernophthora
- Species: E. maculicostella

Binomial name
- Ernophthora maculicostella (Ragonot, 1888)

Synonyms
- Aspithra maculicostella Ragonot, 1888

Species of moth

Ernophthora maculicostella is a species of snout moth in the genus Ernophthora. It was described by Ragonot in 1888. It is found on the Marquesas Archipelago.
