= Peragrarchis martirea =

Scientific classification
- Kingdom: Animalia
- Phylum: Arthropoda
- Class: Insecta
- Order: Lepidoptera
- Family: Carposinidae
- Genus: Peragrarchis
- Species: P. martirea

Binomial name
- Peragrarchis martirea Bippus, 2016

Species of moth

Peragrarchis martirea is a species of moth in the family Carposinidae, found on Reunion Island. Peragrarchis martirea has a wingspan of 8 mm (wing to body).

== Wings ==
Like most "fruitworm moths", Peragrarchis martirea has grey hindwings. The forewings, however, are a beige color, with darker brown marks.
