= Iressa microsema =

Scientific classification
- Kingdom: Animalia
- Phylum: Arthropoda
- Class: Insecta
- Order: Lepidoptera
- Family: Cosmopterigidae
- Genus: Iressa
- Species: I. microsema

Binomial name
- Iressa microsema Clarke, 1986

Species of moth

Iressa microsema is a moth in the family Cosmopterigidae. It is found on the Marquesas Islands.
