= Asymphorodes oculisignis =

Scientific classification
- Kingdom: Animalia
- Phylum: Arthropoda
- Clade: Pancrustacea
- Class: Insecta
- Order: Lepidoptera
- Family: Cosmopterigidae
- Genus: Asymphorodes
- Species: A. oculisignis

Binomial name
- Asymphorodes oculisignis Meyrick, 1934

Species of moth

Asymphorodes oculisignis is a moth of the family Agonoxenidae. It was described by Edward Meyrick in 1934. It is found on the Marquesas Archipelago.
