= Scopula menytes =

Scientific classification
- Domain: Eukaryota
- Kingdom: Animalia
- Phylum: Arthropoda
- Class: Insecta
- Order: Lepidoptera
- Family: Geometridae
- Genus: Scopula
- Species: S. menytes

Binomial name
- Scopula menytes Prout, 1935

Species of geometer moth in subfamily Sterrhinae

Scopula menytes is a moth of the family Geometridae. It is found in the Marquesas Archipelago. It was described based on a single male from Hitikau Ridge on Ua Huka at 870 m (2,850 ft) above sea level. The wingspan of this specimen, the holotype, is 23 mm (0.91 in).
