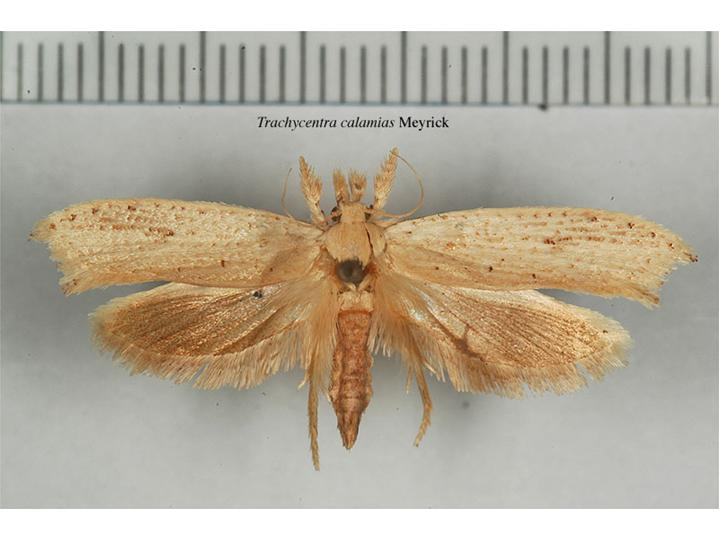

Scientific classification
- Kingdom: Animalia
- Phylum: Arthropoda
- Clade: Pancrustacea
- Class: Insecta
- Order: Lepidoptera
- Family: Tineidae
- Subfamily: Hapsiferinae
- Genus: Trachycentra; Meyrick, 1886

Type species
- Trachycentra calamias Meyrick, 1886

Species
- 11, see text

Synonyms
- Harpeptila A.N.Diakonoff, 1968

= Trachycentra =

Genus of moths

Trachycentra is a small genus of the fungus moth family, Tineidae. Therein, it belongs to the subfamily Hapsiferinae.

With eleven known species, this is one of the smaller genera of fungus moths:

- Trachycentra amphiloxa Meyrick, 1907
- Trachycentra calamias Meyrick, 1886
- Trachycentra chlorogramma Meyrick, 1907 (= T. aulacitis)
- Trachycentra cicatricosa Meyrick, 1922
- Trachycentra corethrodes (A.N.Diakonoff, 1968)
- Trachycentra elaeotropha Meyrick, 1933
- Trachycentra glaucias Meyrick, 1907
- Trachycentra prasina (A.N.Diakonoff, 1968)
- Trachycentra psorodes Meyrick, 1907
- Trachycentra rhynchitis Meyrick, 1938
- Trachycentra sagmatias Meyrick, 1907
