= Eudonia psednopa =

Scientific classification
- Kingdom: Animalia
- Phylum: Arthropoda
- Class: Insecta
- Order: Lepidoptera
- Family: Crambidae
- Genus: Eudonia
- Species: E. psednopa

Binomial name
- Eudonia psednopa (Meyrick, 1929)

Synonyms
- Scoparia psednopa Meyrick, 1929

Species of moth

Eudonia psednopa is a moth in the family Crambidae. It was described by Edward Meyrick in 1929. It is found on Rapa Iti in French Polynesia.
