= Scopula tahitiensis =

Scientific classification
- Domain: Eukaryota
- Kingdom: Animalia
- Phylum: Arthropoda
- Class: Insecta
- Order: Lepidoptera
- Family: Geometridae
- Genus: Scopula
- Species: S. tahitiensis

Binomial name
- Scopula tahitiensis Orhant, 2003

Species of geometer moth in subfamily Sterrhinae

Scopula tahitiensis is a moth of the family Geometridae that is endemic to Tahiti.
