= Asymphorodes bipunctatus =

Scientific classification
- Kingdom: Animalia
- Phylum: Arthropoda
- Clade: Pancrustacea
- Class: Insecta
- Order: Lepidoptera
- Family: Cosmopterigidae
- Genus: Asymphorodes
- Species: A. bipunctatus

Binomial name
- Asymphorodes bipunctatus J. F. G. Clarke, 1986

Species of moth

Asymphorodes bipunctatus is a moth of the family Agonoxenidae. Found in French Polynesia, it was described by John Frederick Gates Clarke in 1986.
