= Idioblasta isoterma =

Scientific classification
- Kingdom: Animalia
- Phylum: Arthropoda
- Class: Insecta
- Order: Lepidoptera
- Family: Crambidae
- Genus: Idioblasta
- Species: I. isoterma

Binomial name
- Idioblasta isoterma (Meyrick, 1935)

Synonyms
- Mestolobes isoterma Meyrick, 1935

Species of moth

Idioblasta isoterma is a moth in the family Crambidae. It was described by Edward Meyrick in 1935. It is found on the Marquesas Archipelago in French Polynesia.
