= Peragrarchis pelograpta =

Scientific classification
- Kingdom: Animalia
- Phylum: Arthropoda
- Class: Insecta
- Order: Lepidoptera
- Family: Carposinidae
- Genus: Peragrarchis
- Species: P. pelograpta

Binomial name
- Peragrarchis pelograpta (Meyrick, 1929)

Synonyms
- Meridarchis pelograpta Meyrick, 1929

Species of moth

Peragrarchis pelograpta is a moth in the family Carposinidae. It is found on the Austral Islands.
