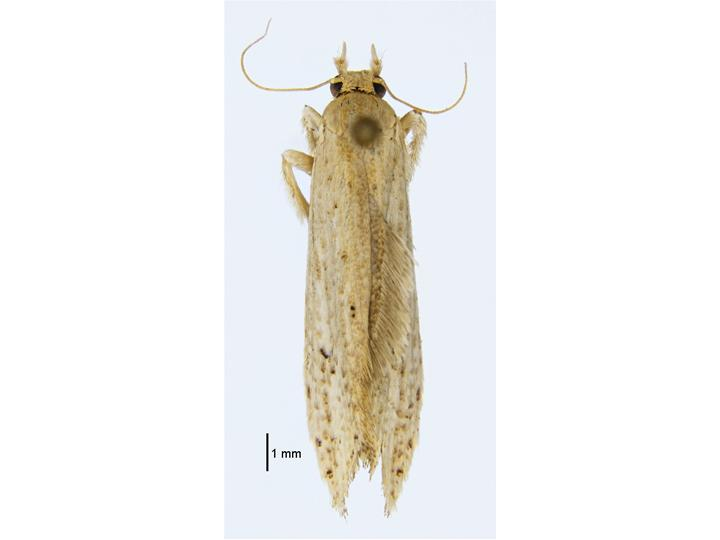

Scientific classification
- Domain: Eukaryota
- Kingdom: Animalia
- Phylum: Arthropoda
- Class: Insecta
- Order: Lepidoptera
- Family: Tineidae
- Genus: Trachycentra
- Species: T. chlorogramma

Binomial name
- Trachycentra chlorogramma Meyrick, 1907

Synonyms
- Trachycentra aulacitis Meyrick, 1907

= Trachycentra chlorogramma =

Species of moth

Trachycentra chlorogramma is a moth of the family Tineidae. It is found on the Cook Islands, Fiji, Papua New Guinea, the Solomon Islands and Tonga.

The wingspan is 26–30 mm. The forewings are whitish ochreous, towards the dorsum slightly tinged with rosy fuscous. There are brownish-ochreous interneural streaks, sometimes sprinkled with fuscous, those running to the costa terminated by dots of blackish irroration (speckles). The dorsal area is sometimes sprinkled with fuscous. There are three subdorsal pale tufts, tipped with blackish points. The hindwings are grey.

The larvae have been recorded feeding on coconut and sugarcane. The larvae live in a case which is open at both ends. Full-grown larvae are white with a brown head. They reach a length of about 25 mm. Pupation takes place in a case made of plant fibres arranged more or less longitudinally.
