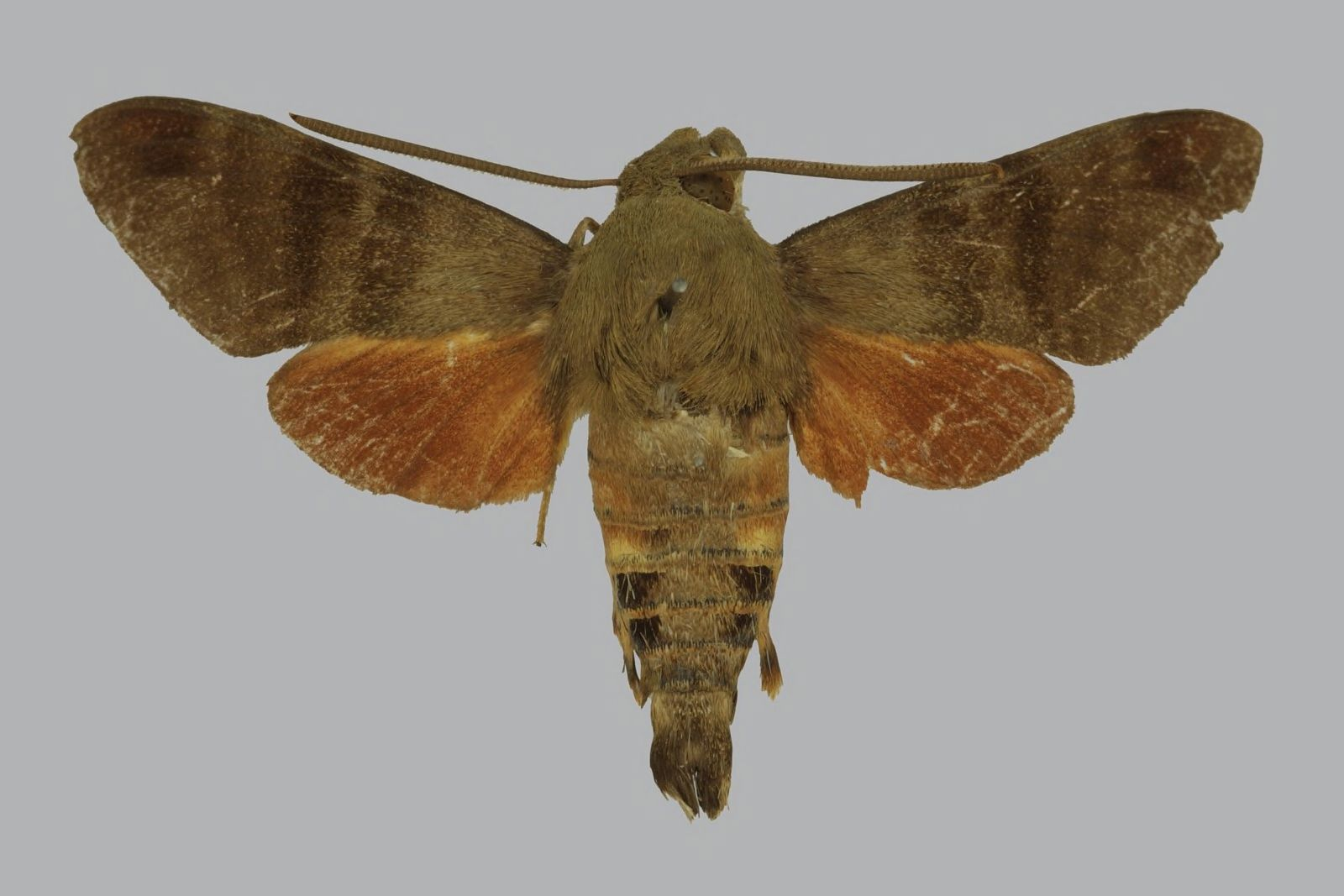
- Macroglossum marquesanum. Mounted specimen

Scientific classification
- Kingdom: Animalia
- Phylum: Arthropoda
- Class: Insecta
- Order: Lepidoptera
- Family: Sphingidae
- Genus: Macroglossum
- Species: M. marquesanum

Binomial name
- Macroglossum marquesanum Collenette, 1935

= Macroglossum marquesanum =

Species of moth

Macroglossum marquesanum is a moth of the family Sphingidae.

== Distribution ==
This endemic species is known from the Marquesas Islands.

== Description ==
Macroglossum marquesanum has a wingspan of 60–65 mm (2.4–2.6 in) (in males), and a body length of about 15–16.5 mm (0.59–0.65 in). These large moths have dark brown or brown-olive head, thorax and abdomen. Forewings are brown, with three faintly defined transversal darker patches. Hindwings are yellowish.

== Bibliography ==
- Pinhey, E (1962): Hawk Moths of Central và Southern Africa. Longmans Southern Africa, Cape Town.
- Pierre E. I. Viette - Catalogue of the Heterocerous Lepidoptera from French Oceania
- A. M. Adamson Foreword - Review of the Fauna of the Marquesas Islands and Discussion of its Origin
- Christophe Avon - Sphingidae Bibliography (2016)
- C. L. Collenette - The Arctiidae, Noctuidae and Sphingidae of the St. George Expedition from French Oceania
