= Stathmopoda perfuga =

Scientific classification
- Kingdom: Animalia
- Phylum: Arthropoda
- Class: Insecta
- Order: Lepidoptera
- Family: Stathmopodidae
- Genus: Stathmopoda
- Species: S. perfuga

Binomial name
- Stathmopoda perfuga (Meyrick, 1928)

Synonyms
- Ulochora perfuga Meyrick, 1928; Asymphorodes perfuga

Species of moth

Stathmopoda perfuga is a moth of the family Agonoxenidae. It is found on Rapa Iti.
