= Pseudomeritastis clarkei =

Scientific classification
- Domain: Eukaryota
- Kingdom: Animalia
- Phylum: Arthropoda
- Class: Insecta
- Order: Lepidoptera
- Family: Tortricidae
- Genus: Pseudomeritastis
- Species: P. clarkei

Binomial name
- Pseudomeritastis clarkei Obraztsov, 1966

Species of moth

Pseudomeritastis clarkei is a species of moth of the family Tortricidae. It is found in Colombia.

The length of the forewings is about 9 mm. The forewings are light grey with brown-ferruginous markings, edged and in part transversely strigulated (finely streaked) with reddish fuscous. The hindwings are pale yellowish, slightly darker externally and cream white basally.

== Etymology ==
The species is named for its discoverer, Dr. J. F. Gates Clarke.
