= Asymphorodes spintheropus =

Scientific classification
- Kingdom: Animalia
- Phylum: Arthropoda
- Clade: Pancrustacea
- Class: Insecta
- Order: Lepidoptera
- Family: Cosmopterigidae
- Genus: Asymphorodes
- Species: A. spintheropus

Binomial name
- Asymphorodes spintheropus (Meyrick, 1934)

Synonyms
- Stagmatophora spintheropus Meyrick, 1934

Species of moth

Asymphorodes spintheropus is a moth of the family Agonoxenidae. It was described by Edward Meyrick in 1934. It is found in French Polynesia.
