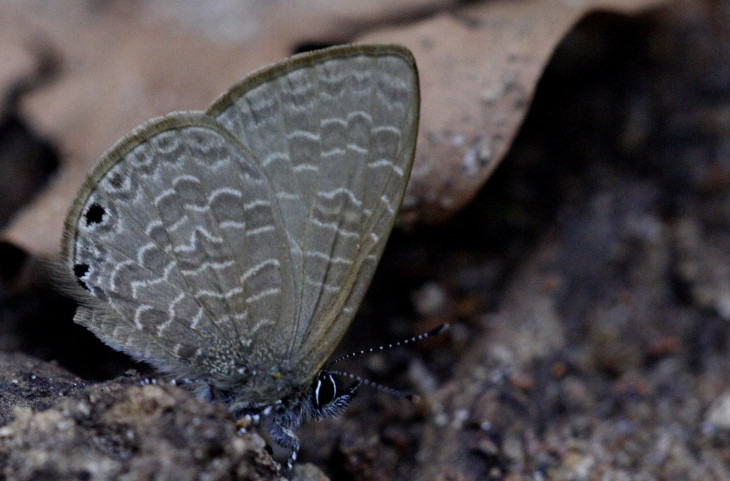

Scientific classification
- Kingdom: Animalia
- Phylum: Arthropoda
- Class: Insecta
- Order: Lepidoptera
- Family: Lycaenidae
- Genus: Petrelaea
- Species: P. dana

Binomial name
- Petrelaea dana (de Nicéville, [1884])

= Petrelaea dana =

Dingy lineblue

Species of butterfly

Petrelaea dana, the dingy lineblue, is a species of lycaenid butterfly found in Indomalayan realm.

== Description ==
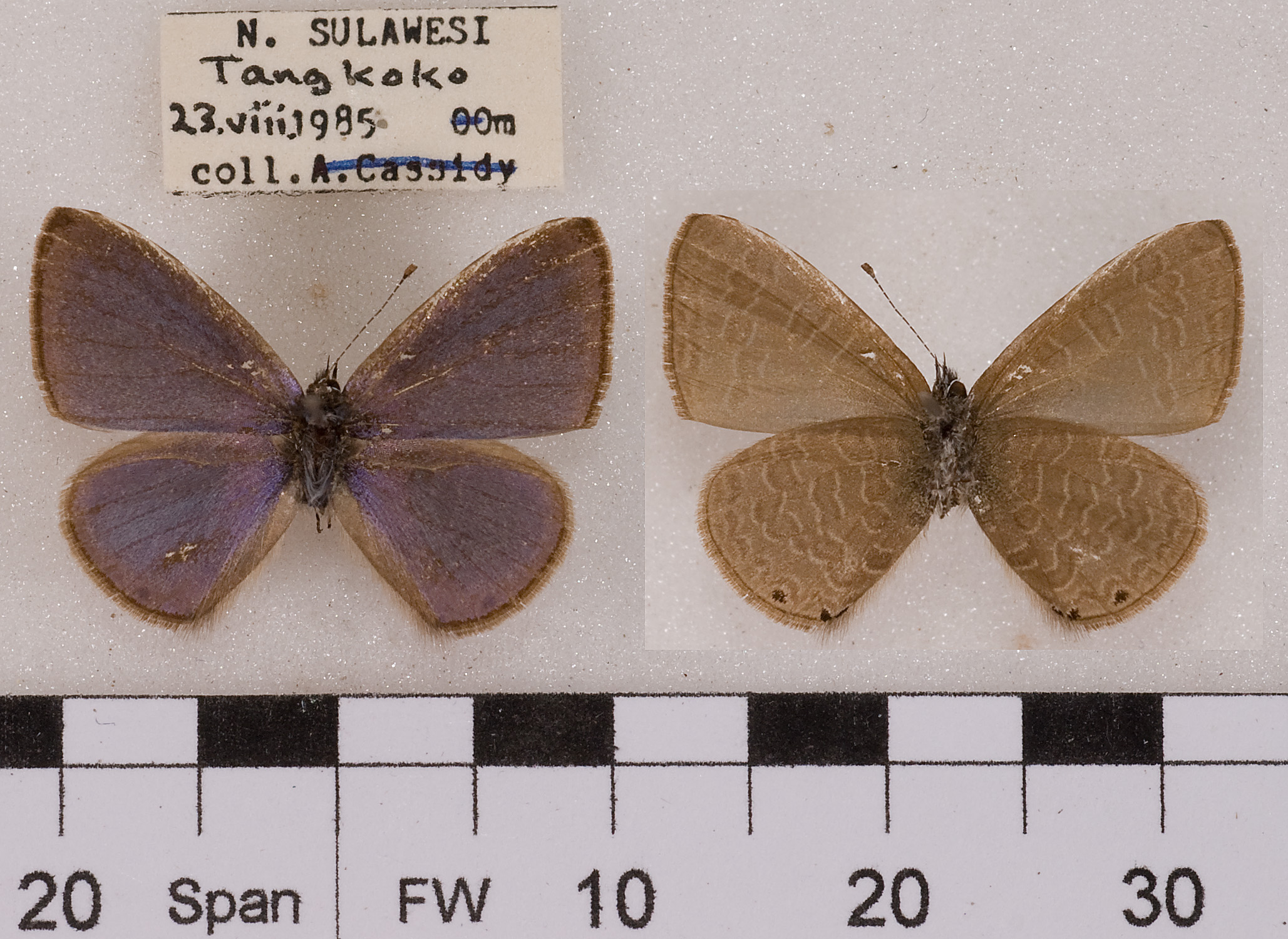
From Sulawesi

Male upperside: from pale violet to dark bluish purple. Forewings and hindwings: comparatively broad, anteciliary brown lines widened slightly at apex of forewing. Hindwing: in addition costal and dorsal margins narrowly paler and duller in colour; termen not furnished with a tail at apex of vein 2. Underside: dull hair-brown to ochraceous brown. Forewing: two pairs of short, slender, transverse white strigae, the inner pair from costa to median vein across middle of cell, the outer pair from costa along each side of the discocellulars stopping short at lower apex of cell; a transverse, discal, bisinuate, catenulated (chain-like) narrow band formed of a double series of slender white lunules followed by an inner and outer subterminal series of transversely elongate spots enclosed in or bordered on the inner and outer sides by obscure slender whitish lunules; lastly, a dark brown anteciliary line. Hindwing: crossed by the following slender white lunular lines: two subbasal, two short lines near apex of cell, one on each side of the discocellulars, and two highly irregular, sinuous and broken on the disc; these are followed by some obscure lunular subterminal markings of dull white lines, in interspaces 1 and 2 by subterminal black spots, and a dark brown anteciliary line. Antenna, head and abdomen dark brown, the shafts of the antennae ringed with white; thorax bluish purple; beneath: the palpi and thorax with mixed black and white hairs, abdomen sullied white.

Female upperside: costa and termen very widely, dorsum very narrowly brownish, darkest on the apex; middle two-thirds of the wing from base white with iridescent blue scales; a transverse dark discocellular spot but no anteciliary dark lines. Hindwing: dusky brown, slightly bluish between the veins on basal half of wing. Underside: pale ochraceous white, markings similar to those in the male, but as they are dark ochraceous they show up more distinctly. Antennae, head, thorax and abdomen dark brown; beneath: the palpi and thorax white, abdomen pale ochraceous.

== Distribution ==
Kumaon to Sikkim; Bhutan; Bengal; southern India: Nilgiris, Cochin; Chittagong; Upper and Lower Burma; Tenasserim; Sri Lanka, Maldives.
