= Asymphorodes chalcozona =

Scientific classification
- Kingdom: Animalia
- Phylum: Arthropoda
- Clade: Pancrustacea
- Class: Insecta
- Order: Lepidoptera
- Family: Cosmopterigidae
- Genus: Asymphorodes
- Species: A. chalcozona

Binomial name
- Asymphorodes chalcozona Meyrick, 1934

Species of moth

Asymphorodes chalcozona is a moth of the family Agonoxenidae. It is found on Tahiti.
