= Idioblasta lacteata =

Scientific classification
- Domain: Eukaryota
- Kingdom: Animalia
- Phylum: Arthropoda
- Class: Insecta
- Order: Lepidoptera
- Family: Crambidae
- Genus: Idioblasta
- Species: I. lacteata

Binomial name
- Idioblasta lacteata Warren, 1891

Species of moth

Idioblasta lacteata is a moth in the family Crambidae. It was described by Warren in 1891. It is found on the Marquesas Archipelago.
