= Asymphorodes nephocirca =

Scientific classification
- Kingdom: Animalia
- Phylum: Arthropoda
- Clade: Pancrustacea
- Class: Insecta
- Order: Lepidoptera
- Family: Cosmopterigidae
- Genus: Asymphorodes
- Species: A. nephocirca

Binomial name
- Asymphorodes nephocirca Meyrick, 1929

Species of moth

Asymphorodes nephocirca is a moth of the family Agonoxenidae. It was described by Edward Meyrick in 1929. It is found on the Marquesas Archipelago.
