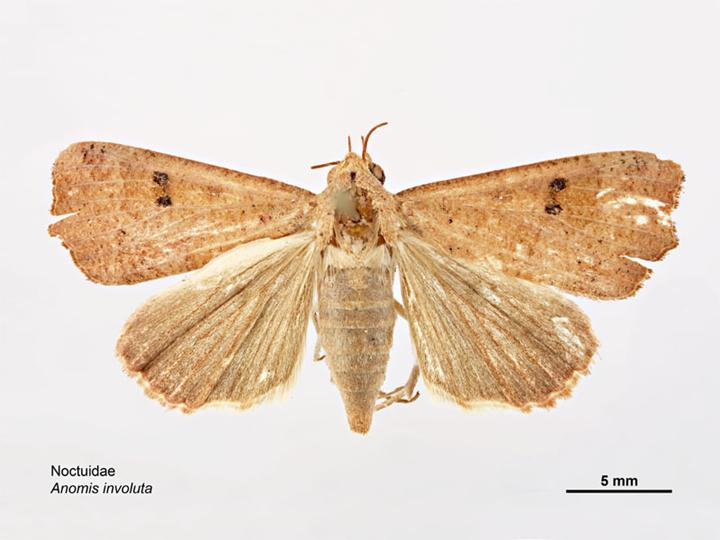

Scientific classification
- Kingdom: Animalia
- Phylum: Arthropoda
- Class: Insecta
- Order: Lepidoptera
- Superfamily: Noctuoidea
- Family: Erebidae
- Genus: Anomis
- Species: A. involuta

Binomial name
- Anomis involuta (Walker, [1858])

Synonyms
- Gonitis involuta Walker, [1858]; Gonitis basalis Walker, [1858]; Tiridata colligata Walker, 1865; Gonitis vitiensis Butler, 1886; Cosmophila dona Swinhoe, 1919; Anomis brima Swinhoe, 1920

= Anomis involuta =

Species of insect

Anomis involuta, the jute looper or hibiscus cutworm, is a moth of the family Erebidae. It has a wide distribution, including the Cook Islands, Hong Kong, Japan, Korea, the Society Islands and Australia (including Western Australia, the Northern Territory, Queensland, New South Wales and Norfolk Island). It is also known from Kenya and Somalia.

The wingspan is about 40 mm.
