= Caloptilia hilaropis =

Scientific classification
- Kingdom: Animalia
- Phylum: Arthropoda
- Class: Insecta
- Order: Lepidoptera
- Family: Gracillariidae
- Genus: Caloptilia
- Species: C. hilaropis

Binomial name
- Caloptilia hilaropis (Meyrick, 1926)

Synonyms
- Caloptilia crypsidelta (Meyrick, 1926); Caloptilia crysidelta (Viette, 1949)

Species of moth

Caloptilia hilaropis is a moth of the family Gracillariidae. It is known from the Austral Islands, the southernmost group of islands in French Polynesia.
