= Anatrachyntis incertulella =

Pandanus flower moth

Scientific classification
- Kingdom: Animalia
- Phylum: Arthropoda
- Clade: Pancrustacea
- Class: Insecta
- Order: Lepidoptera
- Family: Cosmopterigidae
- Genus: Anatrachyntis
- Species: A. incertulella

Binomial name
- Anatrachyntis incertulella (Walker, 1864)

Synonyms
- Several, see text

Species of moth

Anatrachyntis incertulella, the pandanus flower moth, is a small cosmet moth species (family Cosmopterigidae). It belongs to subfamily Cosmopteriginae. This was the first "micromoth" species to be described from Hawaiʻi. The type specimens were collected there by the 1820s Beechey expedition and described by the English entomologist Francis Walker in 1864; they are now in the British Museum of Natural History.

It is found mainly in Polynesia, from the Hawaiian Islands across the Society and Marquesas Islands to the Austral Islands and Pitcairn Island. It has also been recorded on Fiji, in Queensland (and maybe elsewhere in Australia), on Okinawa and on Rodrigues; except the first locality, these seem to be fairly recent introductions or accidental finds however.

The caterpillar larvae feed on Pandanus species, including Pandanus tectorius.

== Synonyms ==
This species has been described anew several times from localities where it was not yet known. The junior synonyms thus created are:

- Aeoloscelis aulacosema Lower, 1904
- Gelechia incertulella Walker, 1864
- Pyroderces aulacosema (Lower, 1904)
- Pyroderces incertulella (Walker, 1864)
- Pyroderces subcarnea Meyrick, 1924
- Stagmatophora incertulella (Walker, 1864)
- Stagmatophora tridigitella Walsingham, 1907

It may also have been placed in Proterocosma, but this was usually considered a subgenus of Stagmatophora in earlier times. As it seems, though, Proterocosma is not particularly closely related to either Stagmatophora or Anatrachyntis.
