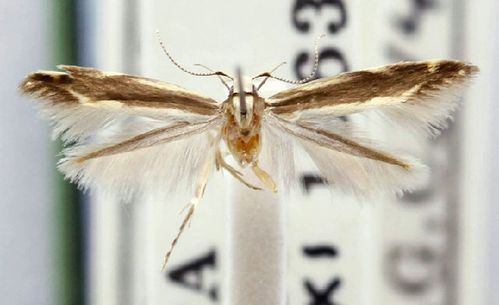

Scientific classification
- Kingdom: Animalia
- Phylum: Arthropoda
- Class: Insecta
- Order: Lepidoptera
- Family: Cosmopterigidae
- Genus: Iressa
- Species: I. neoleuca

Binomial name
- Iressa neoleuca Clarke, 1971

= Iressa neoleuca =

Species of moth

Iressa neoleuca is a moth in the family Cosmopterigidae. It is found on Rapa Iti.
