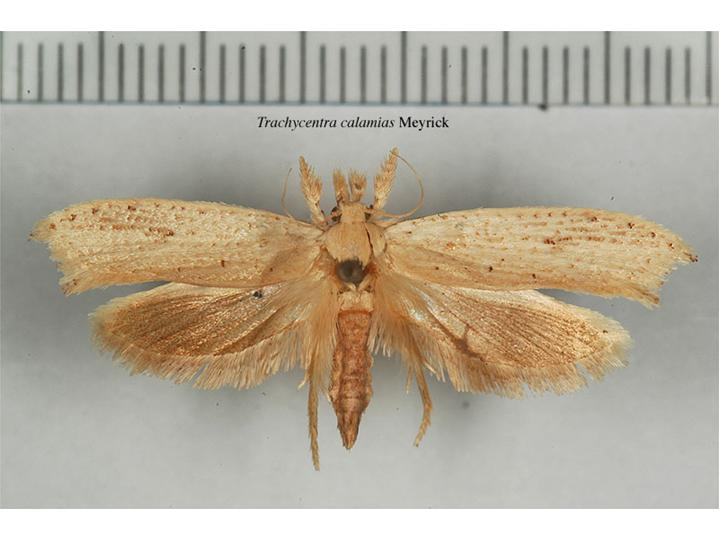

Scientific classification
- Kingdom: Animalia
- Phylum: Arthropoda
- Class: Insecta
- Order: Lepidoptera
- Family: Tineidae
- Genus: Trachycentra
- Species: T. calamias

Binomial name
- Trachycentra calamias Meyrick, 1886

= Trachycentra calamias =

Species of moth

Trachycentra calamias is a moth of the family Tineidae described by Edward Meyrick in 1886. It is found on the Cook Islands, Fiji, French Polynesia and Tonga.

The wingspan is 27–32 mm. The forewings are whitish ochreous, slightly brownish tinged, suffused with ochreous whitish towards the costa and the hind margin. There are faint indications of numerous small brownish-ochreous spots and two small tufts of raised black-tipped scales on the submedian fold before and beyond the middle. There are also some blackish scales forming an obscure X-shaped mark in the disc beyond the middle. The hindwings are fuscous grey, with a whitish apex.

The larvae have been recorded feeding in the tops of coconut trees.
