= Stathmopoda monoxesta =

Scientific classification
- Domain: Eukaryota
- Kingdom: Animalia
- Phylum: Arthropoda
- Class: Insecta
- Order: Lepidoptera
- Family: Stathmopodidae
- Genus: Stathmopoda
- Species: S. monoxesta

Binomial name
- Stathmopoda monoxesta (Meyrick, 1929)

Synonyms
- Asymphorodes monoxesta Meyrick, 1929

Species of moth

Stathmopoda monoxesta is a moth of the family Agonoxenidae. It is found in Tahiti.
