= J. F. Gates Clarke =

American entomologist

- Born: February 22, 1905; Victoria, British Columbia, Canada
- Died: September 17, 1990 (aged 85); Hyattsville, Maryland
- Employer: Smithsonian Institution's National Museum of Natural History
- Known for: authority on moths, discoverer of Pseudomeritastis clarkei species of moth which bears his name
- Spouses: Thelma Miesen Clarke (m. 1929, died in 1988); Nancy du Pre Clarke (m. 1989)
- Children: J. F. Gates Clarke Jr., Carol Lewis

John Frederick Gates Clarke (February 22, 1905 – September 17, 1990) was a Canadian-American entomologist and an authority on moths. He worked at the Smithsonian Institution's National Museum of Natural History.

== See also ==
- Category:Taxa named by J. F. Gates Clarke
