= List of Lepidoptera of the Chagos Archipelago =

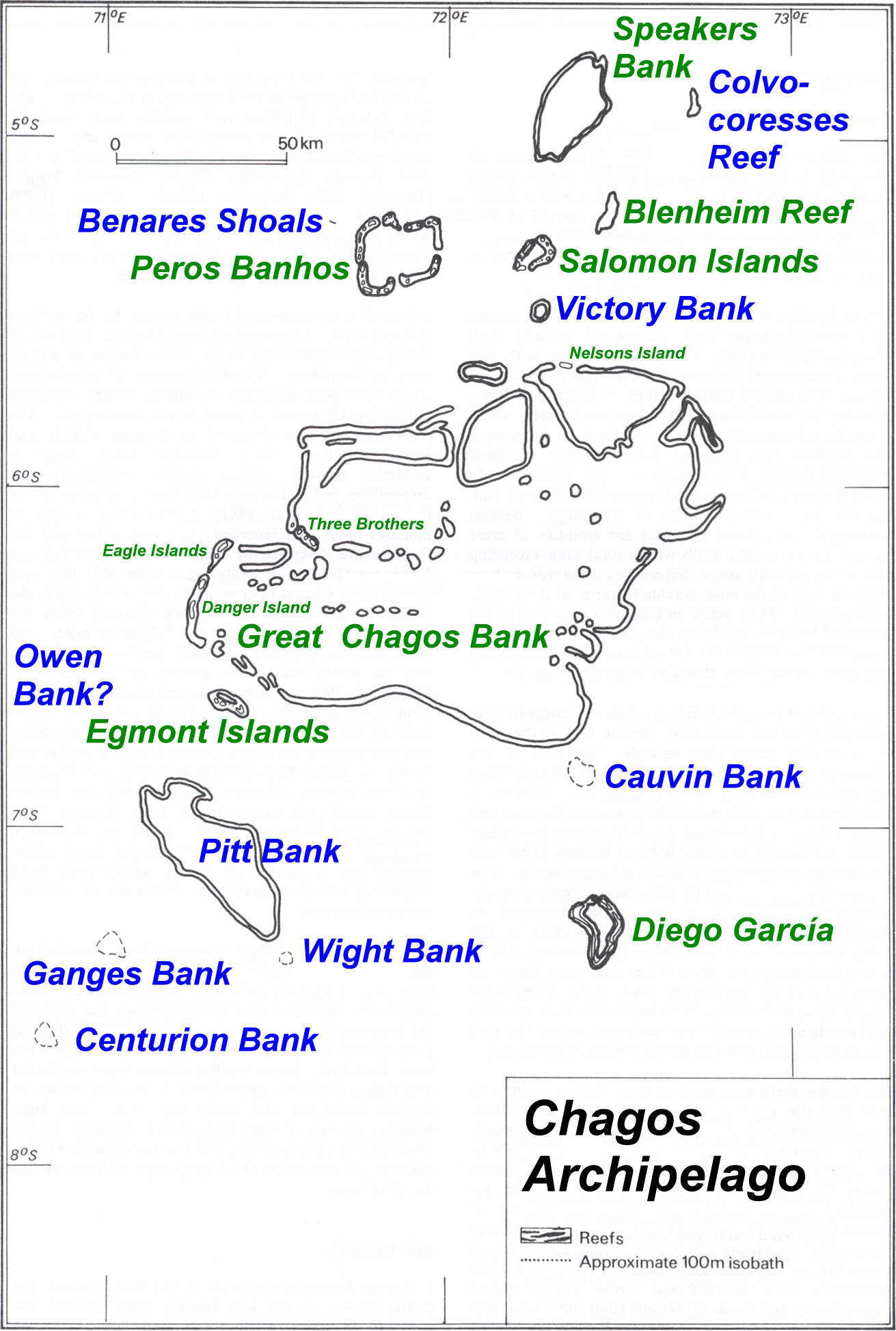
The Chagos Archipelago

Lepidoptera of the Chagos Archipelago consist of both the butterflies and moths recorded from the islands of the Chagos Archipelago, a group of seven atolls comprising more than 60 tropical islands in the Indian Ocean. The archipelago consists of five emergent atolls, Diego Garcia, Egmont, the Great Chagos Bank, Peros Banhos and Salomon. There are also several submerged atolls and vast banks and shoals. The whole territory covers 54,400 km^{2} of the Indian Ocean, of which the archipelago covers about 37,500 km^{2}. The Chagos Archipelago has been British territory since 1814 and was made a dependency of the United Kingdom in 1965.

According to a recent estimate, there are a total of 63 Lepidoptera species present in the Chagos Archipelago.

== Butterflies ==
=== Lycaenidae ===
- Petrelaea dana (de Nicéville, [1884])

=== Nymphalidae ===
- Hypolimnas bolina (Linnaeus, 1758) (ssp. Hypolimnas bolina euphorioides)
- Junonia villida Godart, 1819 (ssp. Junonia villida chagoensis)

== Macro moths ==
=== Arctiidae ===
- Brunia antica (Walker 1854)
- Utetheisa pulchelloides Hampson, 1907

=== Geometridae ===
- Comostola pyrrhogona (Walker, 1866)
- Glaucoclystis immixtaria (Walker, 1862)
- Scopula actuaria (Walker, 1861)

=== Noctuidae ===
- Amyna axis (Guenée, 1852)
- Amyna natalis (Walker, 1858)
- Anomis sabulifera Guenée, 1852
- Anticarsia irrorata (Fabricius, 1781)
- Callopistria maillardi Guénée, 1862
- Chasmina candida (Walker, 1865) (misidentified as Chasmina tibialis)
- Chrysodeixis eriosoma (Doubleday, 1843)
- Chrysodeixis illuminata (G.S. Robinson, 1968)
- Condica conducta (Walker, [1857])
- Eublemma cochylioides (Guenée, 1852)
- Mocis frugalis (Fabricius, 1775)
- Spodoptera litura (Fabricius, 1775)
- Spodoptera mauritia (Boisduval, 1833)
- Stictoptera hironsi Barnett, Emms & Holloway, 1998
- Thyas coronata (Fabricius, 1775)
- Thyas honesta Hübner, 1806

=== Nolidae ===
- Garella nilotica (Rogenhofer, 1881)

=== Sphingidae ===
- Acherontia lachesis (Fabricius, 1798)
- Agrius convolvuli (Linnaeus, 1758)
- Cephonodes picus (Cramer 1777)
- Hippotion velox (Fabricius, 1793)
- Macroglossum corythus Walker 1856

== Micro moths ==
=== Cosmopterigidae ===
- Labdia tentoria Meyrick, 1911

=== Gelechiidae ===
- Brachmia autonoma Meyrick, 1910

=== Hyblaeidae ===
- Hyblaea puera (Cramer, 1777)

=== Pterophoridae ===
- Megalorhipida defectalis (Fabricius, 1793)
- Lantanophaga pusillidactylus (Walker, 1864)

=== Pyralidae ===
- Aethaloessa calidalis (Guenée, 1854) (ssp. Aethaloessa calidalis calidalis)
- Achyra massalis (Walker, 1859)
- Bradina admixtalis Walker, 1859
- Cnaphalocrocis poeyalis Boisduval, 1833
- Culladia admigratella Walker, 1863
- Diaphania indica (Saunders, 1851)
- Endotricha mesenterialis (Walker, 1859) (ssp. Endotricha mesenterialis mesenterialis)
- Etiella grisea Hampson, 1903 (ssp. Etiella grisea grisea)
- Eurrhyparodes tricoloralis (Zeller, 1852)
- Galleria mellonella (Linnaeus, 1758)
- Herpetogramma licarsisalis (Walker, 1859)
- Hydriris ornatalis (Duponchel, 1832)
- Lamprosema chagosalis T. B. Fletcher, 1911
- Lamprosema niphealis Walker, 1859
- Lamprosema salomonalis T. B. Fletcher, 1911
- Mabra eryxalis (Walker, 1859)
- Omiodes indicata (Fabricius, 1775)
- Omiodes poeonalis (Walker, 1859)
- Parotis suralis (Lederer, 1863)
- 1 undescribed Phycita species
- Sameodes cancellalis (Zeller, 1852)
- Spoladea recurvalis (Fabricius, 1775)
- Sufetula chagosalis (T. B. Fletcher, 1910)
- Sufetula minimalis T. B. Fletcher, 1911
- Synclera univocalis (Walker, 1859)

=== Tineidae ===
- Erechthias molynta (Meyrick, 1911)

=== Tortricidae ===
- Adoxophyes privatana (Walker, 1863)
- Dudua aprobola (Meyrick, 1886)
- Thaumatotibia encarpa (Meyrick, 1920)
