= Sufetula diminutalis =

Scientific classification
- Kingdom: Animalia
- Phylum: Arthropoda
- Clade: Pancrustacea
- Class: Insecta
- Order: Lepidoptera
- Family: Crambidae
- Genus: Sufetula
- Species: S. diminutalis

Binomial name
- Sufetula diminutalis (Walker, 1866)

Synonyms
- Hydrocampa dematrialis Druce, 1896

Species of moth

Sufetula diminutalis is a snout moth in the subfamily Lathrotelinae of the family Crambidae. It was described by Francis Walker in 1866 in the genus Isopteryx from material collected in Honduras.

It is found in Florida, the Caribbean (including Bermuda, Cuba, Dominican Republic, Jamaica), southern Central America (including Panama, Honduras, Costa Rica) and South America (including Colombia, Peru, Venezuela). The species was first recorded in Europe from numerous adults collected in 2012 in the Zoological Garden of Leipzig, Germany.

The length of the forewings is 4.5–7.5 mm. Adults are on wing year round.

The larvae feed on the roots of palm species, e.g. oil palms, where they bore into the growing tips of roots.
