= Orthoraphis =

Scientific classification
- Domain: Eukaryota
- Kingdom: Animalia
- Phylum: Arthropoda
- Class: Insecta
- Order: Lepidoptera
- Family: Crambidae
- Subfamily: Lathrotelinae
- Genus: Orthoraphis; Hampson, 1896

Genus of moths

Orthoraphis is a genus of moths of the family Crambidae described by George Hampson in 1896. The genus was recently transferred from the subfamily Spilomelinae to Lathrotelinae.

== Species ==
- Orthoraphis metasticta Hampson, 1899
- Orthoraphis obfuscata (Hampson, 1893)
- Orthoraphis striatalis Hampson, 1916

== Former species ==
Orthoraphis paula West, 1931 was moved to the genus Sufetula.
