= Acropentias papuensis =

Scientific classification
- Kingdom: Animalia
- Phylum: Arthropoda
- Clade: Pancrustacea
- Class: Insecta
- Order: Lepidoptera
- Family: Crambidae
- Genus: Acropentias
- Species: A. papuensis

Binomial name
- Acropentias papuensis Hampson, 1919

Species of moth

Acropentias papuensis is a moth in the family Crambidae. It was described by George Hampson in 1919. It is found in New Guinea.

The wingspan is about 22 mm. The forewings are pale fulvous brown with slight dark irroration (sprinkling). The hindwings are white, tinged with fulvous brown.
