= Synclera retractilinea =

Scientific classification
- Kingdom: Animalia
- Phylum: Arthropoda
- Class: Insecta
- Order: Lepidoptera
- Family: Crambidae
- Genus: Synclera
- Species: S. retractilinea

Binomial name
- Synclera retractilinea (Hampson, 1917)

Synonyms
- Pagyda retractilinea Hampson, 1917

Species of moth

Synclera retractilinea is a moth in the family Crambidae. It was described by George Hampson in 1917. It is found in Kenya.

The wingspan is about 22 mm. The forewings are white, the costal and terminal areas with a faint ochreous tinge. There is a curved yellow-brown antemedial line and a slight brown mark in the middle of the cell and a discoidal bar. The postmedial line is yellow brown, rather oblique to vein 5, then erect to below vein 3, then retracted to the lower angle of the cell and rather oblique to the inner margin. There is a curved rather indistinct and diffused yellow-brown subterminal line, somewhat dentate between two of the veins. There is a fine yellow-brown terminal line. The hindwings are white, the terminal area with a faint ochreous tinge. The postmedial line is yellow brown, straight and erect to below vein 3, then retracted to the lower angle of the cell and rather oblique to the inner margin. There is a curved yellow-brown subterminal line, incurved at vein 3 to the angle of the postmedial line and ending at the tornus. There is also a fine yellow brown terminal line, except towards the tornus.
