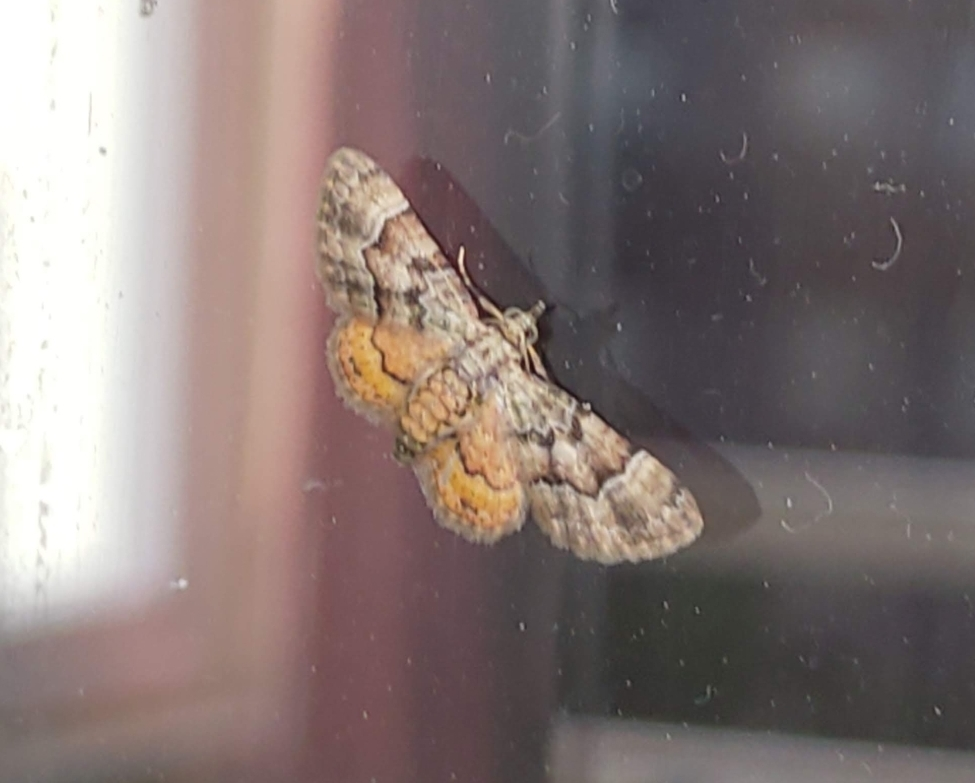

Scientific classification
- Kingdom: Animalia
- Phylum: Arthropoda
- Clade: Pancrustacea
- Class: Insecta
- Order: Lepidoptera
- Family: Geometridae
- Genus: Glaucoclystis
- Species: G. acygonia

Binomial name
- Glaucoclystis acygonia (C. Swinhoe, 1895)

Synonyms
- Chloroclystis acygonia C. Swinhoe, 1895

= Glaucoclystis acygonia =

Moth species

Glaucoclystis acygonia is a moth in the family Geometridae first described by Charles Swinhoe in 1895. It's found in the north-eastern Himalayas.
