= Sufetula carbonalis =

Scientific classification
- Kingdom: Animalia
- Phylum: Arthropoda
- Clade: Pancrustacea
- Class: Insecta
- Order: Lepidoptera
- Family: Crambidae
- Genus: Sufetula
- Species: S. carbonalis

Binomial name
- Sufetula carbonalis Hayden, 2013

Species of moth

Sufetula carbonalis is a moth species in the family Crambidae. It was described by James E. Hayden in 2013. It is found in North America, where it has been recorded from Florida.

The length of the forewings is 3.5–5 mm. Adults have been recorded on wing in April, May, July, November and December.

The larvae probably feed on the roots of palm species, possibly including Phoenix roebelenii and Dypsis lutescens.

== Etymology ==
The species name refers to the dark grey maculation and is derived from Latin carbo (meaning charcoal).
