= Synclera tibialis =

Scientific classification
- Kingdom: Animalia
- Phylum: Arthropoda
- Class: Insecta
- Order: Lepidoptera
- Family: Crambidae
- Genus: Synclera
- Species: S. tibialis

Binomial name
- Synclera tibialis Moore, 1888

Species of moth

Synclera tibialis is a moth in the family Crambidae. It was described by Frederic Moore in 1888. It is found in Darjeeling, India.
