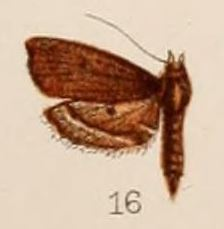

Scientific classification
- Kingdom: Animalia
- Phylum: Arthropoda
- Clade: Pancrustacea
- Class: Insecta
- Order: Lepidoptera
- Family: Crambidae
- Genus: Sufetula
- Species: S. nitidalis

Binomial name
- Sufetula nitidalis Hampson, 1908

= Sufetula nitidalis =

Species of moth

Sufetula nitidalis is a moth of the family Crambidae. It was described by George Hampson in 1908 and is found in Sri Lanka.

This species has a wingspan of 20 mm.
