= Diplopseustis prophetica =

Scientific classification
- Kingdom: Animalia
- Phylum: Arthropoda
- Clade: Pancrustacea
- Class: Insecta
- Order: Lepidoptera
- Family: Crambidae
- Genus: Diplopseustis
- Species: D. prophetica

Binomial name
- Diplopseustis prophetica Meyrick, 1887

Synonyms
- Myriostephes eucosmeta Turner, 1939

Species of moth

Diplopseustis prophetica is a moth in the family Crambidae. It was described by Edward Meyrick in 1887. It is found in Australia, where it has been recorded from Victoria.

The wingspan is about 14 mm. The forewings are pale brownish ochreous, the base of the costa suffused with dark fuscous. The hindwings are pale whitish ochreous, becoming pale brownish ochreous towards the hindmargin.
