= Sufetula cyanolepis =

Scientific classification
- Kingdom: Animalia
- Phylum: Arthropoda
- Clade: Pancrustacea
- Class: Insecta
- Order: Lepidoptera
- Family: Crambidae
- Genus: Sufetula
- Species: S. cyanolepis

Binomial name
- Sufetula cyanolepis Hampson, 1912

Species of moth

Sufetula cyanolepis is a moth in the family Crambidae. It was described by George Hampson in 1912. It is found in Indonesia (Sulawesi).

The wingspan is about 14 mm. The forewings are ochreous largely suffused with red-brown and fuscous, and with scattered patches of silvery-blue scales. The base and the costal area to the antemedial line are blackish and the antemedial line is ochreous, defined on each side by blackish and with silvery-blue scales on its outer edges. There are two minute semicircular marks defined by black on the medial part of the costa and there is a diffused blackish discoidal annulus. The postmedial line is ochreous defined on each side by blackish and with silvery-blue scales on its inner edge. There are some minute silvery-blue streaks before the termen and there is a dark terminal line. The hindwings are ochreous with a diffused oblique medial black-brown band from the cell to the inner margin, as well as an ochreous postmedial line, which is obsolete on the costal area and then defined on the inner side by a black line and with a broad diffused blackish band on the outer area. There is a subterminal series of diffused black striae with slight patches of silvery-blue scales before termen on the costal half.
