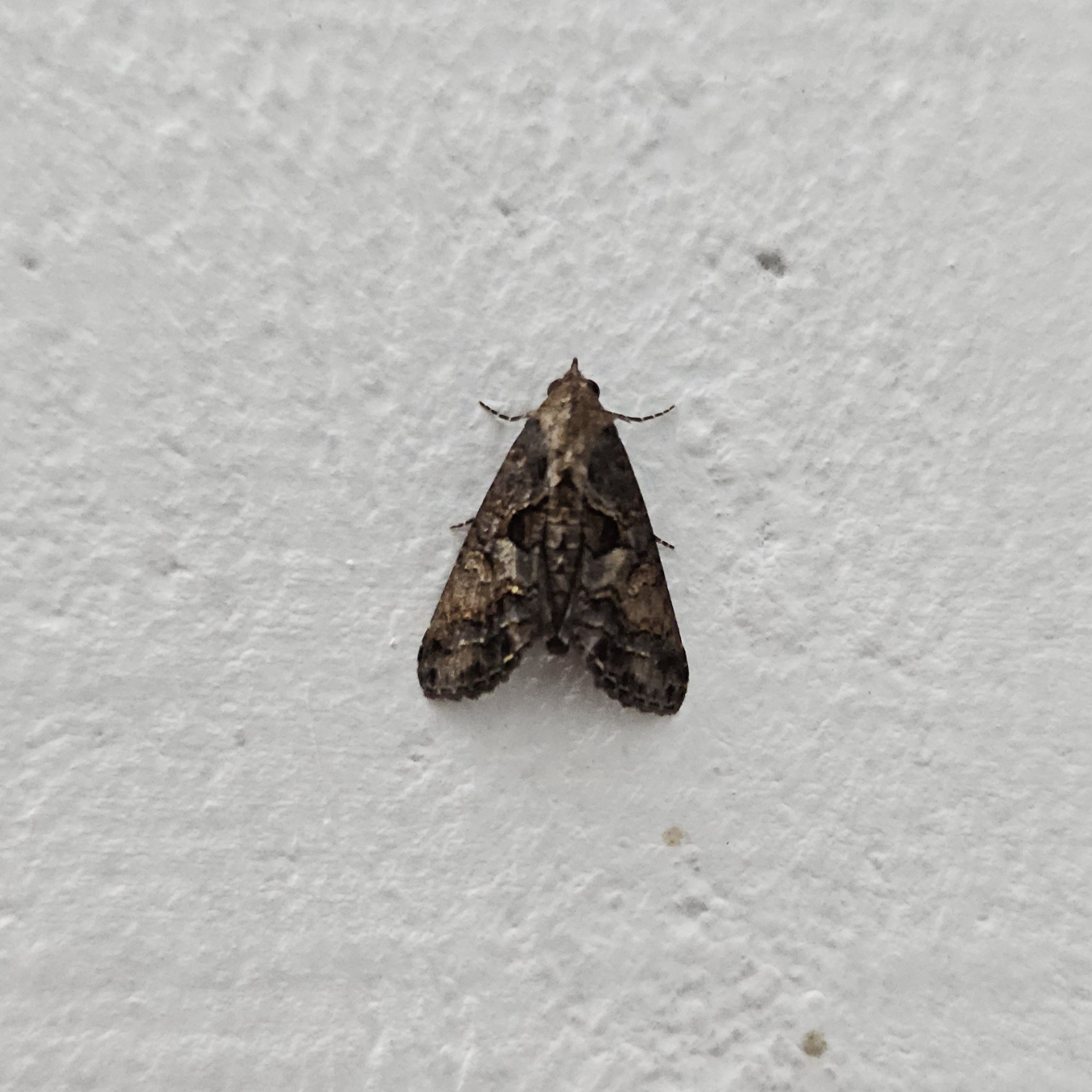

Scientific classification
- Kingdom: Animalia
- Phylum: Arthropoda
- Clade: Pancrustacea
- Class: Insecta
- Order: Lepidoptera
- Superfamily: Noctuoidea
- Family: Euteliidae
- Genus: Stictoptera; Guenée, 1852

Synonyms
- Dandaca Walker, 1858; Minica Walker, 1858; Steiria Walker, 1858

= Stictoptera =

Genus of moths

Stictoptera is a genus of moths of the family Euteliidae erected by Achille Guenée in 1852.

== Description ==
Palpi slender and nearly naked, where the second joint reaching vertex of head and third joint long. Antennae very long and slender. Thorax smoothly scaled. Abdomen with dorsal tufts on proximal segments. Tibia slightly hairy. Forewings rather long and narrow with crenulate cilia. A small tuft of scales on the reniform can be seen. Frenulum of male very strong which is single in female.

== Species ==
- Stictoptera aequisecta Turner, 1933
- Stictoptera anaemia Hampson, 1905
- Stictoptera antemarginata Saalmüller, 1880
- Stictoptera columba (Walker, 1856) (Himalaya, Thailand, Sundaland)
- Stictoptera confluens (Walker, 1858)
- Stictoptera conturbata (Walker, 1869)
- Stictoptera cucullioides Guenée, 1852
- Stictoptera esmeralda Holloway, 1976 (Borneo, Sumatra)
- Stictoptera ferrifera (Walker, 1864)
- Stictoptera gabri (Berio, 1970)
- Stictoptera grisea Moore, 1867(Himalaya, Sundaland, Philippines)
- Stictoptera griveaudi Laporte, 1970
- Stictoptera hironsi Barnett, Emms & Holloway, 1998
- Stictoptera macromma Snellen, 1880 (Indo-Australian tropics)
- Stictoptera melanistis Hampson, 1912
- Stictoptera pammeces Turner, 1920
- Stictoptera pectinata Kenrick, 1917
- Stictoptera poecilosoma Saalmüller, 1880
- Stictoptera rhabdota A. E. Prout, 1927
- Stictoptera semialba (Walker, 1864) Malaysia, Sumatra, Borneo)
- Stictoptera signifera (Walker, 1857)
- Stictoptera terribilis Holloway, 1976 (from Borneo)
- Stictoptera trajiciens Walker, 1857
- Stictoptera tridentifera Holloway 1979
