= Stictoptera trajiciens =

Scientific classification
- Kingdom: Animalia
- Phylum: Arthropoda
- Class: Insecta
- Order: Lepidoptera
- Superfamily: Noctuoidea
- Family: Euteliidae
- Genus: Stictoptera
- Species: S. trajiciens

Binomial name
- Stictoptera trajiciens Walker, 1857

Synonyms
- Steiria trajiciens Walker, 1857

Species of moth

Stictoptera trajiciens is a moth of the family Euteliidae first described by Francis Walker in 1857. It is found in Oriental tropics of Sri Lanka, to Sundaland, the Philippines, Sulawesi and New Guinea.

The adult has greyish forewings. Its longitudinal striations are broken. There is a diagnostic white spot subtornally and row of tiny white marginal spots. The caterpillar is a dull watery green. Head light orange or greenish orange. Prothorax and anal claspers are yellow. Prolegs are green. There are lateral and subspiracular whitish lines. Before pupation, the larva turns a greenish shiny purple. Host plants include Garcinia indica and Garcinia forbesii.
