= Sufetula dulcinalis =

Scientific classification
- Kingdom: Animalia
- Phylum: Arthropoda
- Clade: Pancrustacea
- Class: Insecta
- Order: Lepidoptera
- Family: Crambidae
- Genus: Sufetula
- Species: S. dulcinalis

Binomial name
- Sufetula dulcinalis (Snellen, 1899)

Synonyms
- Pseudochoreutes dulcinalis Snellen, 1899

Species of moth

Sufetula dulcinalis is a moth in the family Crambidae. It was described by Samuel Constantinus Snellen van Vollenhoven in 1899. It is found in Colombia.
