= Sufetula bilinealis =

Scientific classification
- Kingdom: Animalia
- Phylum: Arthropoda
- Clade: Pancrustacea
- Class: Insecta
- Order: Lepidoptera
- Family: Crambidae
- Genus: Sufetula
- Species: S. bilinealis

Binomial name
- Sufetula bilinealis Hampson, 1912

Species of moth

Sufetula bilinealis is a moth in the family Crambidae. It was described by George Hampson in 1912. It is found in Papua New Guinea.

The wingspan is about 18 mm. The forewings are black-brown with a cupreous gloss. There is a curved slightly sinuous white antemedial line and two white points on the middle of the costa and three small annuli on the postmedial part of the costa. There is also a black discoidal bar defined on the outer side by white, as well as a white, sinuous subterminal line arising from the third annulus with two minute white points beyond it on the costa. The hindwings are white, suffused with fuscous except on the inner area. There is a black discoidal spot and a white postmedial line.
