= Glaucoclystis expedita =

Scientific classification
- Kingdom: Animalia
- Phylum: Arthropoda
- Clade: Pancrustacea
- Class: Insecta
- Order: Lepidoptera
- Family: Geometridae
- Genus: Glaucoclystis
- Species: G. expedita

Binomial name
- Glaucoclystis expedita (Prout, 1958)

Synonyms
- Gymnoscelis expedita Prout, 1958

Species of moth

Glaucoclystis expedita is a moth in the family Geometridae. It is found on Peninsular Malaysia.
