= Synclera stramineatis =

Scientific classification
- Kingdom: Animalia
- Phylum: Arthropoda
- Class: Insecta
- Order: Lepidoptera
- Family: Crambidae
- Genus: Synclera
- Species: S. stramineatis

Binomial name
- Synclera stramineatis Kirti, 1993

Species of moth

Synclera stramineatis is a moth in the family Crambidae. It was described by Jagbir Singh Kirti in 1993. It is found in Arunachal Pradesh, India.
