= Synclera himachalensis =

Scientific classification
- Kingdom: Animalia
- Phylum: Arthropoda
- Class: Insecta
- Order: Lepidoptera
- Family: Crambidae
- Genus: Synclera
- Species: S. himachalensis

Binomial name
- Synclera himachalensis Pajni & Rose, 1978

Species of moth

Synclera himachalensis is a moth in the family Crambidae. It was described by H. R. Pajni and H. S. Rose in 1978. It is found in Himachal Pradesh, India.
