= Nola pygmaea =

Scientific classification
- Kingdom: Animalia
- Phylum: Arthropoda
- Class: Insecta
- Order: Lepidoptera
- Superfamily: Noctuoidea
- Family: Nolidae
- Genus: Nola
- Species: N. pygmaea

Binomial name
- Nola pygmaea (Hampson, 1912)

Species of moth

Nola pygmaea is a moth in the family Nolidae. It is found in Mexico. It was described by George Hampson in 1912 in the Crambidae genus Sufetula, but was later transferred to Nola.

The wingspan is about 10 mm. The forewings are grey, suffused with brown. The antemedial line is blackish and waved and there is an oblique blackish striga from the middle of the costa, as well as a small black discoidal spot placed on the postmedial line, which is blackish defined on outer side by white. There is an indistinct whitish subterminal line defined on the inner side by brown and a terminal series of black points defined on the inner side by white. The hindwings are grey suffused with brown and with a blackish antemedial line from the cell to the inner margin. There is also a blackish discoidal point and an indistinct dark postmedial line, defined on the outer side by whitish. There is a terminal series of black striae defined on the inner side by whitish.
