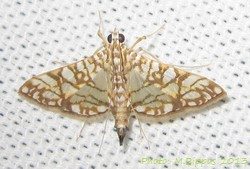
- Synclera traducalis

Scientific classification
- Kingdom: Animalia
- Phylum: Arthropoda
- Clade: Pancrustacea
- Class: Insecta
- Order: Lepidoptera
- Family: Crambidae
- Tribe: Margaroniini
- Genus: Synclera; Lederer, 1863

Type species
- Synclera traducalis (Zeller, 1852)

Synonyms
- Synctera Möschler, 1886

= Synclera =

Genus of moths

Synclera is a genus of moths of the family Crambidae described by Julius Lederer in 1863.

== Species ==
- Synclera chlorophasma (Butler, 1878)
- Synclera danalis (Hampson, 1893)
- Synclera himachalensis Pajni & Rose, 1978 (from India)
- Synclera jarbusalis (Walker, 1859)
- Synclera nigropenultimalis Kirti, 1993
- Synclera retractilinea (Hampson, 1917)
- Synclera rotundalis (Hampson, 1893)
- Synclera seychellensis J. C. Shaffer & Munroe, 2007 (from Seychelles)
- Synclera stramineatis Kirti, 1993
- Synclera subtessellalis (Walker, 1865) (from Congo & India)
- Synclera tenuivittalis Turati, 1934
- Synclera tibialis Moore, 1888
- Synclera traducalis (Zeller, 1852)
- Synclera univocalis (Walker, 1859) (from South Africa, India to Myanmar)
