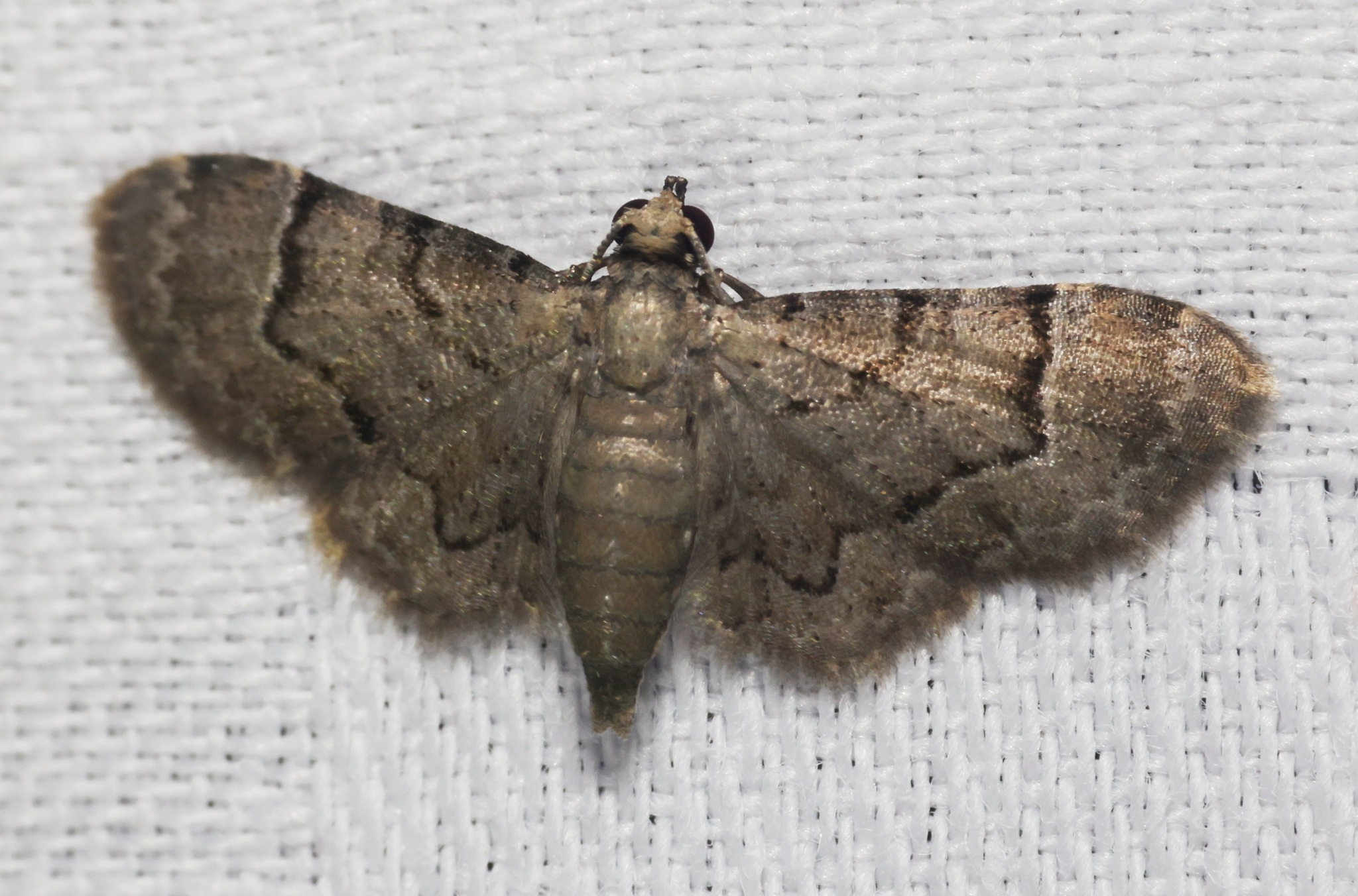

Scientific classification
- Kingdom: Animalia
- Phylum: Arthropoda
- Clade: Pancrustacea
- Class: Insecta
- Order: Lepidoptera
- Family: Geometridae
- Genus: Glaucoclystis
- Species: G. sinuosa

Binomial name
- Glaucoclystis sinuosa (C. Swinhoe, 1895)

Synonyms
- Chloroclystis sinuosa C. Swinhoe, 1895; Chloroclystis nigrilineata Hampson, 1896; Chloroclystis reddita Prout, 1958

= Glaucoclystis sinuosa =

Species of moth

Glaucoclystis sinuosa is a species of moth in the family Geometridae that was first described by Charles Swinhoe in 1895. It is found in the north-eastern Himalayas.

== Subspecies ==
- Glaucoclystis sinuosa sinuosa
- Glaucoclystis sinuosa nigrilineata (Hampson, 1896)
- Glaucoclystis sinuosa reddita (Prout, 1958)
