= Auchmophoba alternata =

Scientific classification
- Domain: Eukaryota
- Kingdom: Animalia
- Phylum: Arthropoda
- Class: Insecta
- Order: Lepidoptera
- Family: Crambidae
- Genus: Auchmophoba
- Species: A. alternata

Binomial name
- Auchmophoba alternata (Warren, 1895)

Synonyms
- Petta alternata Warren, 1895; Auchmophoba tynnuta Turner, 1913

Species of moth

Auchmophoba alternata is a moth in the family Crambidae. It was described by William Warren in 1895. It is found in India (Assam), Borneo, Sumbawa and Australia, where it has been recorded Queensland.

The wingspan is 10–11 mm. The forewings are fuscous mixed with whitish. There are four pairs of short white streaks from the costa, as well as a fuscous subterminal line. The hindwings are whitish with fuscous suffusion on the dorsal part of the disc and terminal suffusion .
