= Synclera jarbusalis =

Scientific classification
- Kingdom: Animalia
- Phylum: Arthropoda
- Class: Insecta
- Order: Lepidoptera
- Family: Crambidae
- Genus: Synclera
- Species: S. jarbusalis

Binomial name
- Synclera jarbusalis (Walker, 1859)

Synonyms
- Samea jarbusalis Walker, 1859; Zebronia cottalis Walker, 1859

Species of moth

Synclera jarbusalis is a moth in the family Crambidae. It was described by Francis Walker in 1859. It is found in the Dominican Republic, Haiti, Puerto Rico, Jamaica, Cuba, Florida, Mexico, Costa Rica, El Salvador, Honduras, Panama and Argentina.

The wingspan is about 18 mm. Adults have been recorded on wing from July to January and from March to April in Florida.
