= Synclera seychellensis =

Scientific classification
- Kingdom: Animalia
- Phylum: Arthropoda
- Class: Insecta
- Order: Lepidoptera
- Family: Crambidae
- Genus: Synclera
- Species: S. seychellensis

Binomial name
- Synclera seychellensis J. C. Shaffer & Munroe, 2007

Species of moth

Synclera seychellensis is a moth in the family Crambidae. It was described by Jay C. Shaffer and Eugene G. Munroe in 2007. It is found on the Seychelles, where it has been recorded from Aldabra.
