= Auchmophoba costastrigalis =

Scientific classification
- Domain: Eukaryota
- Kingdom: Animalia
- Phylum: Arthropoda
- Class: Insecta
- Order: Lepidoptera
- Family: Crambidae
- Genus: Auchmophoba
- Species: A. costastrigalis

Binomial name
- Auchmophoba costastrigalis (Hampson, 1896)

Synonyms
- Petta costastrigalis Hampson, 1896

Species of moth

Auchmophoba costastrigalis is a moth in the family Crambidae. It was described by George Hampson in 1896. It is found in Sri Lanka.
