= Acropentias aureus =

Scientific classification
- Kingdom: Animalia
- Phylum: Arthropoda
- Clade: Pancrustacea
- Class: Insecta
- Order: Lepidoptera
- Family: Crambidae
- Genus: Acropentias
- Species: A. aureus

Binomial name
- Acropentias aureus (Butler, 1878)

Synonyms
- Micraeschus aureus Butler, 1878; Sparagmia obtusalis Christoph, 1881; Marimatha straminea Butler

Species of moth

Acropentias aureus is a moth in the family Crambidae. It was described by Arthur Gardiner Butler in 1878. It is found in Japan, China (Heilongjiang, Zhejiang, Fujian, Hainan, Guangxi, Yunnan), Taiwan and the Russian Far East.

The length of the forewings is 7–10 mm.
