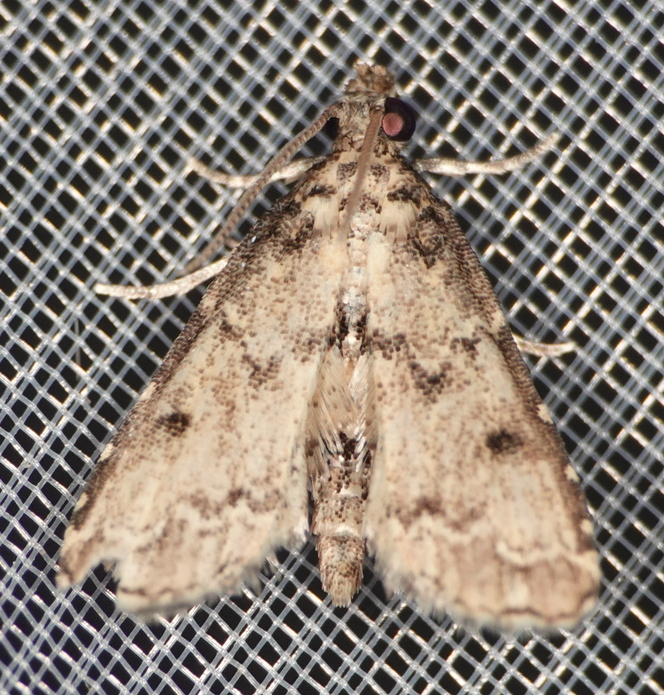

Scientific classification
- Kingdom: Animalia
- Phylum: Arthropoda
- Clade: Pancrustacea
- Class: Insecta
- Order: Lepidoptera
- Family: Crambidae
- Genus: Sufetula
- Species: S. hemiophthalma

Binomial name
- Sufetula hemiophthalma (Meyrick, 1884)

Synonyms
- Diplopseustis hemiophthalma Meyrick, 1884; Cangetta minuscula Turner, 1937

= Sufetula hemiophthalma =

Species of moth

Sufetula hemiophthalma is a moth in the family Crambidae. It was described by Edward Meyrick in 1884. It is found on the Cook Islands, French Polynesia, Fiji and Australia, where it has been recorded from New South Wales and Queensland.

The wingspan is about 12 mm. The forewings are ochreous white, mixed with pale ochreous, and irregularly irrorated (speckled) with fuscous and grey. The costa is suffused with dark fuscous and there is a pale line from one-third of the costa to one-third of the inner margin, suffusedly margined posteriorly with dark fuscous. There is a round blackish discal spot and the costa is marked at one-half, five-eighths, and three-fourths with three semicircular dark-centred pale spots and there is a pale line from four-fifths of the costa to four-fifths of the inner margin, suffusedly margined with dark fuscous. There is a row of small obscure blackish spots along the hind margin. The hindwings are white, irrorated with grey and with a round black discal spot, surrounded by a white patch. There is a white line parallel to the hind margin at two-thirds, partially margined with dark fuscous, as well as a row of small obscure dark fuscous spots along the hind margin and a larger one in indentation.

The larvae feed on Cocos nucifera.
