= Sufetula obliquistrialis =

Scientific classification
- Kingdom: Animalia
- Phylum: Arthropoda
- Clade: Pancrustacea
- Class: Insecta
- Order: Lepidoptera
- Family: Crambidae
- Genus: Sufetula
- Species: S. obliquistrialis

Binomial name
- Sufetula obliquistrialis Hampson, 1912

Species of moth

Sufetula obliquistrialis is a moth in the family Crambidae. It was described by George Hampson in 1912. It is found on the Louisiade Islands.

The wingspan is about 12 mm. The forewings are whitish, tinged with brown and irrorated with black. The basal area is suffused with black-brown and the antemedial line is double and filled in with white. The medial part of the costa has three very oblique wedge-shaped white marks filled in with black and there is a slight discoidal black point, as well as a black double postmedial line, filled in with white. There is some black suffusion beyond it and there is a subterminal black line, as well as a fine terminal black line. The hindwings are whitish, suffused and irrorated with brown and there are some slight black striae on the inner margin, as well as some blackish suffusion below the end of the cell. The postmedial line is white, defined on the inner side by a black line and on the outer by black suffusion. There is a fine, minutely waved black subterminal line from the costa to vein 2, as well as a fine black terminal line.
