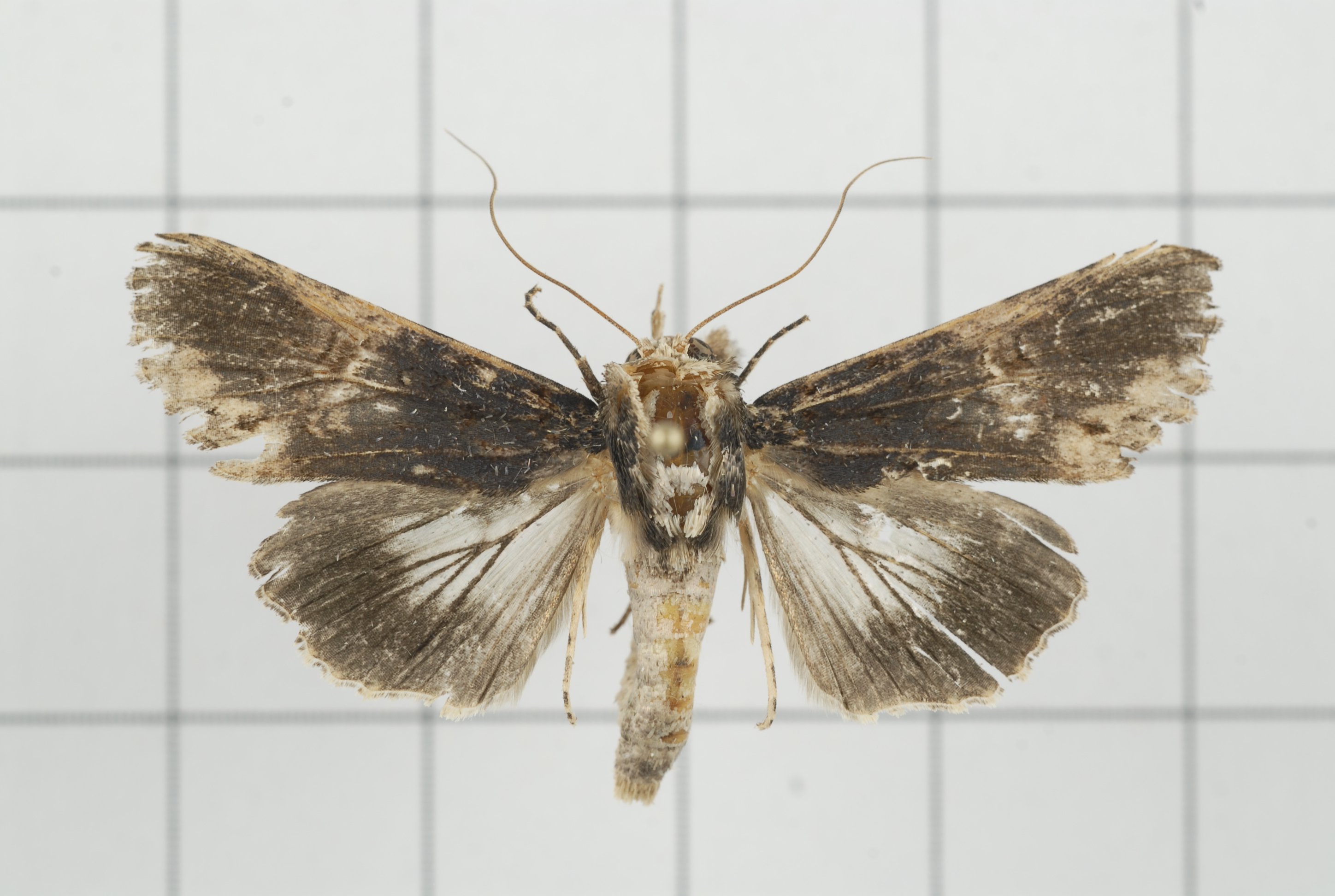

Scientific classification
- Kingdom: Animalia
- Phylum: Arthropoda
- Clade: Pancrustacea
- Class: Insecta
- Order: Lepidoptera
- Superfamily: Noctuoidea
- Family: Euteliidae
- Genus: Stictoptera
- Species: S. cucullioides

Binomial name
- Stictoptera cucullioides Guenée, 1852

Synonyms
- Stictoptera subobliqua (Walker, 1857); Steiria subobliqua Walker, 1857; Steiria variabilis Moore, 1882; Stictoptera timesia Swinhoe, 1893

= Stictoptera cucullioides =

Species of moth

Stictoptera cucullioides is a moth of the family Euteliidae. It is found from the Indo-Australian tropics of India, Sri Lanka to the Bismarck Islands and Queensland. It is an introduced species in Hawaii, where it is found on Oahu, Molokai, Maui and Hawaii.

== Description ==
In the male, the head and thorax are greyish brown. Abdomen fuscous. Forewings greyish brown with numerous indistinct waved lines. Orbicular and reniform stigmata indistinct, where the latter with a few raised scaled on it. A series of small marginal lunules can be seen. Hindwings opalescent hyaline (glass like), where the veins and broad outer band are fuscous with pale colored cilia.

== Ecology ==
Larvae have been recorded on Mesua and Calophyllum species (including Calophyllum inophyllum) and have been reared on Garcinia species. Other recorded food plants include Clusia rosea, Garcinia cambogia and Mammea americana.
