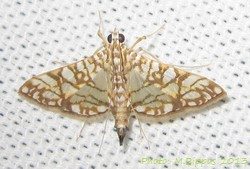

Scientific classification
- Kingdom: Animalia
- Phylum: Arthropoda
- Clade: Pancrustacea
- Class: Insecta
- Order: Lepidoptera
- Family: Crambidae
- Genus: Synclera
- Species: S. traducalis

Binomial name
- Synclera traducalis (Zeller, 1852)

Synonyms
- Eudioptis traducalis Zeller, 1852; Salbia achatinalis Guenée, 1862; Spilomela retinalis Lederer, 1857

= Synclera traducalis =

Species of moth

Synclera traducalis, the variegated pearl, is a species of moth in the family Crambidae. It is found in Sweden, Bulgaria, Cyprus, the Canary Islands, Israel, the Palestinian Territories, Lebanon, Syria, Saudi Arabia, the United Arab Emirates, Yemen, Egypt, Mali, Senegal, Equatorial Guinea, South Africa, La Réunion, India and Sri Lanka.

The wingspan is 20–23 millimetres (0.79–0.91 in).

== Foodplants ==
The larvae feed on Gouania polygama, Ziziphus jujuba and Ziziphus mauritiana.
