= Sufetula metallias =

Scientific classification
- Kingdom: Animalia
- Phylum: Arthropoda
- Class: Insecta
- Order: Lepidoptera
- Family: Crambidae
- Genus: Sufetula
- Species: S. metallias

Binomial name
- Sufetula metallias (Meyrick, 1897)

Species of moth

Sufetula metallias is a moth in the family Crambidae. It was described by Edward Meyrick in 1897 in the genus Diplopseustis, but later transferred to Sufetula. The species is known from the Sangihe Islands in Indonesia, as well as from Leyte in the Philippines, and occurs at elevations between 120 and 650 m.
