= Glaucoclystis azumai =

Scientific classification
- Kingdom: Animalia
- Phylum: Arthropoda
- Class: Insecta
- Order: Lepidoptera
- Family: Geometridae
- Genus: Glaucoclystis
- Species: G. azumai

Binomial name
- Glaucoclystis azumai (Inoue, 1971)

Synonyms
- Chloroclystis azumai Inoue, 1971

Species of moth

Glaucoclystis azumai is a moth in the family Geometridae. It is found in Japan (Ryukyu Islands).

The wingspan is about 23 mm.
