= Synclera tenuivittalis =

Scientific classification
- Kingdom: Animalia
- Phylum: Arthropoda
- Class: Insecta
- Order: Lepidoptera
- Family: Crambidae
- Genus: Synclera
- Species: S. tenuivittalis

Binomial name
- Synclera tenuivittalis Turati, 1934

Species of moth

Synclera tenuivittalis is a moth in the family Crambidae. It was described by Turati in 1934. It is found in Libya.
