= Sufetula minuscula =

Scientific classification
- Kingdom: Animalia
- Phylum: Arthropoda
- Clade: Pancrustacea
- Class: Insecta
- Order: Lepidoptera
- Family: Crambidae
- Genus: Sufetula
- Species: S. minuscula

Binomial name
- Sufetula minuscula Inoue, 1996

Species of moth

Sufetula minuscula is a moth in the family Crambidae. It is found in Japan (Ogasawara Islands).
