= Sufetula grumalis =

Scientific classification
- Kingdom: Animalia
- Phylum: Arthropoda
- Clade: Pancrustacea
- Class: Insecta
- Order: Lepidoptera
- Family: Crambidae
- Genus: Sufetula
- Species: S. grumalis

Binomial name
- Sufetula grumalis Schaus, 1920

Species of moth

Sufetula grumalis is a moth in the family Crambidae. It was described by William Schaus in 1920. It is found in Cuba.

The wingspan is 15 mm. The forewings are grey, the costal margin with black spots and with an outcurved antemedial line, as well as a black spot on the discocellular. There is a postmedial, almost subterminal white line edged on either side with black, as well as an interrupted terminal black line. The hindwings are grey with a black spot on the discocellular and a postmedial line as on the forewings and a wavy marginal black line.
