= Glaucoclystis polyclealis =

Scientific classification
- Kingdom: Animalia
- Phylum: Arthropoda
- Clade: Pancrustacea
- Class: Insecta
- Order: Lepidoptera
- Family: Geometridae
- Genus: Glaucoclystis
- Species: G. polyclealis

Binomial name
- Glaucoclystis polyclealis (Walker, 1859)

Synonyms
- Botys polyclealis Walker, 1859; Gymnoscelis polyclealis

Species of moth

Glaucoclystis polyclealis is a moth in the family Geometridae described by Francis Walker in 1859. It is found in Sri Lanka and on Borneo, Java and Bali.

== Description ==
Its wingspan is about 22 mm. The hind tibia has very very minute medial spur pairs. Body fuscous brown with a slight purplish tinge. Palpi and frons jet black. Forewings with broad medial area defined by waved black lines, edged with grey, the outer line produced to an angle at vein 4. There is an indistinct curved submarginal line. Hindwings with traces of sub-basal and medial lines. A postmedial waved line excurved from vein 2 and 4, and with whitish patches on its outer edge below veins 6 and 2. A waved white submarginal line with whitish patch on it at middle.
