= Sufetula sacchari =

Scientific classification
- Kingdom: Animalia
- Phylum: Arthropoda
- Clade: Pancrustacea
- Class: Insecta
- Order: Lepidoptera
- Family: Crambidae
- Genus: Sufetula
- Species: S. sacchari

Binomial name
- Sufetula sacchari (Seín, 1930)

Synonyms
- Perforadix sacchari Seín, 1930

Species of moth

Sufetula sacchari is a moth in the family Crambidae. It was described by Francisco Seín Jr. in 1930. It is found in Puerto Rico.

There are multiple generations per year.

Larvae have been recorded feeding on the roots of sugarcane, both above and below ground. Pupation takes place below the ground.
