= Glaucoclystis satoi =

Scientific classification
- Kingdom: Animalia
- Phylum: Arthropoda
- Class: Insecta
- Order: Lepidoptera
- Family: Geometridae
- Genus: Glaucoclystis
- Species: G. satoi

Binomial name
- Glaucoclystis satoi Inoue, 2002

Species of moth

Glaucoclystis satoi (Japanese: ミナミチビナミシャク) is a moth in the family Geometridae. It is found in northeast India, northern Vietnam, Taiwan, and the Japanese island Amami.

The wingspan is 11–13 mm (0.43–0.51 in).
