= Orthoraphis obfuscata =

Scientific classification
- Kingdom: Animalia
- Phylum: Arthropoda
- Class: Insecta
- Order: Lepidoptera
- Family: Crambidae
- Genus: Orthoraphis
- Species: O. obfuscata

Binomial name
- Orthoraphis obfuscata (Hampson, 1893)

Synonyms
- Safetula obfuscata Hampson, 1893

Species of moth

Orthoraphis obfuscata is a moth in the family Crambidae. It was described by George Hampson in 1893. It is found in Sri Lanka.
