= Sufetula paula =

Scientific classification
- Domain: Eukaryota
- Kingdom: Animalia
- Phylum: Arthropoda
- Class: Insecta
- Order: Lepidoptera
- Family: Crambidae
- Genus: Sufetula
- Species: S. paula

Binomial name
- Sufetula paula (West, 1931)

Species of moth

Sufetula paula is a moth in the family Crambidae. It was described by West in 1931 in the genus Orthoraphis, but was later moved to Sufetula. It is found in the Philippines (Luzon).
