= Glaucoclystis albicetrata =

Scientific classification
- Kingdom: Animalia
- Phylum: Arthropoda
- Clade: Pancrustacea
- Class: Insecta
- Order: Lepidoptera
- Family: Geometridae
- Genus: Glaucoclystis
- Species: G. albicetrata

Binomial name
- Glaucoclystis albicetrata (Prout, 1958)

Synonyms
- Gymnoscelis albicetrata Prout, 1958

Species of moth

Glaucoclystis albicetrata is a moth in the family Geometridae. It is found on Sulawesi.
