= Diplopseustis constellata =

Scientific classification
- Domain: Eukaryota
- Kingdom: Animalia
- Phylum: Arthropoda
- Class: Insecta
- Order: Lepidoptera
- Family: Crambidae
- Genus: Diplopseustis
- Species: D. constellata

Binomial name
- Diplopseustis constellata Warren, 1896

Species of moth

Diplopseustis constellata is a moth in the family Crambidae. It was described by William Warren in 1896. It is found in India (Khasi Hills).
