= Acropentias =

Scientific classification
- Domain: Eukaryota
- Kingdom: Animalia
- Phylum: Arthropoda
- Class: Insecta
- Order: Lepidoptera
- Family: Crambidae
- Subfamily: Lathrotelinae
- Genus: Acropentias; Meyrick, 1890

Genus of moths

Acropentias is a genus of moths of the family Crambidae.

== Species ==
- Acropentias aureus Butler, 1878
- Acropentias papuensis Hampson, 1919
