= Glaucoclystis griseorufa =

Scientific classification
- Kingdom: Animalia
- Phylum: Arthropoda
- Class: Insecta
- Order: Lepidoptera
- Family: Geometridae
- Genus: Glaucoclystis
- Species: G. griseorufa

Binomial name
- Glaucoclystis griseorufa (Hampson, 1898)

Synonyms
- Chloroclystis griseorufa Hampson, 1898

Species of moth

Glaucoclystis griseorufa is a moth in the family Geometridae. It is found in the north-eastern Himalayas and on Peninsular Malaysia and Borneo. The habitat consists of lowland forests.

== Subspecies ==
- Glaucoclystis griseorufa griseorufa (Himalaya)
- Glaucoclystis griseorufa tranquillata (Prout, 1958) (Peninsular Malaysia, Borneo)
