= Sufetula sythoffi =

Scientific classification
- Kingdom: Animalia
- Phylum: Arthropoda
- Clade: Pancrustacea
- Class: Insecta
- Order: Lepidoptera
- Family: Crambidae
- Genus: Sufetula
- Species: S. sythoffi

Binomial name
- Sufetula sythoffi (Snellen, 1899)

Synonyms
- Pseudochoreutes sythoffi Snellen, 1899

Species of moth

Sufetula sythoffi is a moth in the family Crambidae found in Indonesia (Java). It was described by Snellen in 1899.
