= Glaucoclystis gonias =

Scientific classification
- Domain: Eukaryota
- Kingdom: Animalia
- Phylum: Arthropoda
- Class: Insecta
- Order: Lepidoptera
- Family: Geometridae
- Genus: Glaucoclystis
- Species: G. gonias

Binomial name
- Glaucoclystis gonias (Turner, 1904)

Synonyms
- Chloroclystis gonias Turner, 1904

Species of moth

Glaucoclystis gonias is a moth in the family Geometridae. It is found in Australia (Queensland).
