= Synclera chlorophasma =

Scientific classification
- Kingdom: Animalia
- Phylum: Arthropoda
- Class: Insecta
- Order: Lepidoptera
- Family: Crambidae
- Genus: Synclera
- Species: S. chlorophasma

Binomial name
- Synclera chlorophasma (Butler, 1878)

Synonyms
- Samea chlorophasma Butler, 1878; Synclera praelatalis Möschler, 1886

Species of moth

Synclera chlorophasma is a moth in the family Crambidae. It was described by Arthur Gardiner Butler in 1878. It is found in Jamaica and Honduras.
