= Sufetula brunnealis =

Scientific classification
- Kingdom: Animalia
- Phylum: Arthropoda
- Clade: Pancrustacea
- Class: Insecta
- Order: Lepidoptera
- Family: Crambidae
- Genus: Sufetula
- Species: S. brunnealis

Binomial name
- Sufetula brunnealis Hampson, 1917

Species of moth

Sufetula brunnealis is a moth in the family Crambidae. It was described by George Hampson in 1917. It is found in the Philippines.
