= Glaucoclystis polyodonta =

Scientific classification
- Domain: Eukaryota
- Kingdom: Animalia
- Phylum: Arthropoda
- Class: Insecta
- Order: Lepidoptera
- Family: Geometridae
- Genus: Glaucoclystis
- Species: G. polyodonta

Binomial name
- Glaucoclystis polyodonta (C. Swinhoe, 1895)

Synonyms
- Gymnoscelis polyodonta C. Swinhoe, 1895

Species of moth

Glaucoclystis polyodonta is a moth in the family Geometridae first described by Charles Swinhoe in 1895. It is found in the Indian subregion and on Borneo, Sulawesi, the Bismarck Archipelago and New Guinea. The habitat consists of upper montane and dipterocarp forests.

The wings are medium grey, finely and evenly fasciated with dark blackish grey.
