= Sufetula nigrescens =

Scientific classification
- Kingdom: Animalia
- Phylum: Arthropoda
- Clade: Pancrustacea
- Class: Insecta
- Order: Lepidoptera
- Family: Crambidae
- Genus: Sufetula
- Species: S. nigrescens

Binomial name
- Sufetula nigrescens Hampson, 1912

Species of moth

Sufetula nigrescens is a moth in the family Crambidae. It was described by George Hampson in 1912. It is found in the Democratic Republic of the Congo (Katanga, North Kivu, Equateur), Ivory Coast, Madagascar, Nigeria and Sierra Leone.

The wingspan is about 22 mm. The forewings are brownish grey suffused with black. The antemedial line is black, defined on the inner side by white, angled outwards below the costa, in the cell and the submedian fold, then oblique to the inner margin. There is a black discoidal spot and there are two yellowish white annuli on the costa beyond the middle. The postmedial line is black, defined on the outer side by white forming a small triangular spot on the costa. There is also a black line just before the termen from the costa to the submedian fold, as well as a fine black terminal line. The hindwings are brownish grey, irrorated with black. There is a black discoidal spot with a diffused line from it to the inner margin. The postmedial line is black, defined on the outer side by grey, with blackish suffusion beyond it extending on the costal area to the termen. There is also a sinuous black line just before the termen from the costa to vein 1, as well as a fine black terminal line.
