= Sufetula alychnopa =

Scientific classification
- Kingdom: Animalia
- Phylum: Arthropoda
- Clade: Pancrustacea
- Class: Insecta
- Order: Lepidoptera
- Family: Crambidae
- Genus: Sufetula
- Species: S. alychnopa

Binomial name
- Sufetula alychnopa (Turner, 1908)

Synonyms
- Nannomorpha alychnopa Turner, 1908

Species of moth

Sufetula alychnopa is a moth in the family Crambidae. It was described by Turner in 1908. It is found in Australia, where it has been recorded from Queensland.

The wingspan is about 20 mm.
