= Sufetula trichophysetis =

Scientific classification
- Kingdom: Animalia
- Phylum: Arthropoda
- Clade: Pancrustacea
- Class: Insecta
- Order: Lepidoptera
- Family: Crambidae
- Genus: Sufetula
- Species: S. trichophysetis

Binomial name
- Sufetula trichophysetis Hampson, 1912

Species of moth

Sufetula trichophysetis is a moth in the family Crambidae. It was described by George Hampson in 1912. It is found in Ghana.

The wingspan is 14–16 mm. The forewings are whitish suffused with ochreous yellow and with an indistinct double waved curved antemedial line. The inner line is diffused and the postmedial line is double, ochreous and oblique from the costa to vein 6, then minutely waved, excurved to vein 4, then oblique. There is also a faint diffused ochreous subterminal line and a slight oblique dark subapical striga, as well as a slight dark terminal line from just below the apex to vein 4. The hindwings are whitish suffused with ochreous yellow. The basal half of the submedian fold has a fringe of long spatulate scales and there are indistinct double waved brownish medial and postmedial lines from the discal fold to the inner margin.
