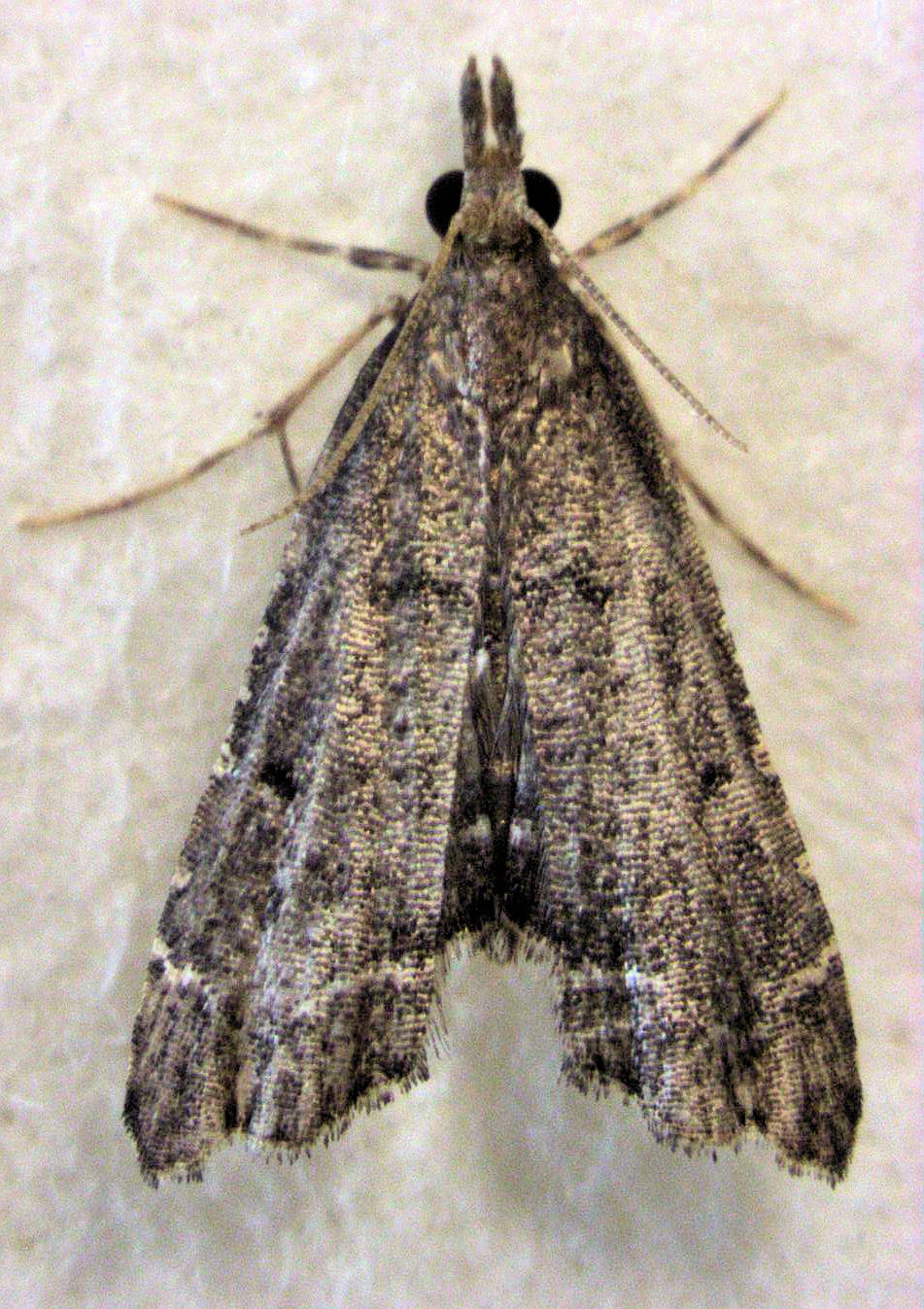

Scientific classification
- Domain: Eukaryota
- Kingdom: Animalia
- Phylum: Arthropoda
- Class: Insecta
- Order: Lepidoptera
- Family: Crambidae
- Genus: Diplopseustis
- Species: D. perieresalis

Binomial name
- Diplopseustis perieresalis (Walker, 1859)

Synonyms
- Ambia perieresalis Walker, 1859; Cymoriza minima Butler, 1881; Sufetula nana Warren, 1896

= Diplopseustis perieresalis =

Species of moth

Diplopseustis perieresalis is a species of moth in the family Crambidae. It is widespread in the Oriental region, Australia and New Zealand, but was introduced to the Western Palaearctic realm, where it quickly expanded its range, and where it is now found in Great Britain, the Netherlands, Belgium, Germany, France, Switzerland, Spain, Portugal and the Canary Islands. In the Afrotropics, a single female specimen has been collected in 1904 in Sudan.

The wingspan is about 15 mm.

The larvae very likely feed on some part of the New Zealand endemic sedge makura (Carex secta), based on observations in Central Otago.
