= Glaucoclystis spinosa =

Scientific classification
- Kingdom: Animalia
- Phylum: Arthropoda
- Class: Insecta
- Order: Lepidoptera
- Family: Geometridae
- Genus: Glaucoclystis
- Species: G. spinosa

Binomial name
- Glaucoclystis spinosa (Inoue, 1971)

Synonyms
- Chloroclystis spinosa Inoue, 1971; Gymnoscelis spinosa

Species of moth

Glaucoclystis spinosa is a species of moth in the family Geometridae. It is found in Japan.
