= Sufetula rectifascialis =

Scientific classification
- Kingdom: Animalia
- Phylum: Arthropoda
- Clade: Pancrustacea
- Class: Insecta
- Order: Lepidoptera
- Family: Crambidae
- Genus: Sufetula
- Species: S. rectifascialis

Binomial name
- Sufetula rectifascialis Hampson, 1896

Species of moth

Sufetula rectifascialis is a moth in the family Crambidae. It was described by George Hampson in 1896. It is found in Sri Lanka.

The wingspan is 12 mm for males and 14 mm for females. The wings are pale suffused with fuscous brown. The forewings have an oblique antemedial line with a whitish band on the inner edge and a black discocellular spot, as well as three pale annuli on the outer half of the costa. There is an oblique postmedial line with a white band on the outer edge. The hindwings have oblique straight ante- and postmedial lines, the former with a black discocellular spot on it and the latter with a white band on its outer edge. There is a waved submarginal line towards the anal angle.
