= Orthoraphis striatalis =

Scientific classification
- Kingdom: Animalia
- Phylum: Arthropoda
- Class: Insecta
- Order: Lepidoptera
- Family: Crambidae
- Genus: Orthoraphis
- Species: O. striatalis

Binomial name
- Orthoraphis striatalis Hampson, 1916

Species of moth

Orthoraphis striatalis is a moth in the family Crambidae. It was described by George Hampson in 1916. It is found in Colombia.
