= Synclera danalis =

Scientific classification
- Kingdom: Animalia
- Phylum: Arthropoda
- Class: Insecta
- Order: Lepidoptera
- Family: Crambidae
- Genus: Synclera
- Species: S. danalis

Binomial name
- Synclera danalis (Hampson, 1893)

Synonyms
- Bocchoris danalis Hampson, 1893

Species of moth

Synclera danalis is a moth in the family Crambidae found in Sri Lanka. It was described by George Hampson in 1893.
