= Glaucoclystis hyperocha =

Scientific classification
- Kingdom: Animalia
- Phylum: Arthropoda
- Clade: Pancrustacea
- Class: Insecta
- Order: Lepidoptera
- Family: Geometridae
- Genus: Glaucoclystis
- Species: G. hyperocha

Binomial name
- Glaucoclystis hyperocha (Prout, 1958)

Synonyms
- Gymnoscelis hyperocha Prout, 1958

Species of moth

Glaucoclystis hyperocha is a moth in the family Geometridae. It is found in Australia.
