= Sufetula sunidesalis =

Scientific classification
- Kingdom: Animalia
- Phylum: Arthropoda
- Clade: Pancrustacea
- Class: Insecta
- Order: Lepidoptera
- Family: Crambidae
- Genus: Sufetula
- Species: S. sunidesalis

Binomial name
- Sufetula sunidesalis Walker, 1859

Synonyms
- Loetrina flexalis Walker, 1863; Mirobriga albicans Walker, 1863

Species of moth

Sufetula sunidesalis is a moth in the family Crambidae. It was described by Francis Walker in 1859. It is found on Borneo and in India (Sikkim, Assam), Sri Lanka and Malaysia.

Adults are cinereous (ash grey) speckled with brown. The wings are partly shaded with pale brown and speckled with darker brown. The exterior line is whitish and the marginal line is dark brown. The forewings have whitish marks along the costa and a blackish apical spot, as well as a whitish interior line.
