= Sufetula macropalpia =

Scientific classification
- Kingdom: Animalia
- Phylum: Arthropoda
- Clade: Pancrustacea
- Class: Insecta
- Order: Lepidoptera
- Family: Crambidae
- Genus: Sufetula
- Species: S. macropalpia

Binomial name
- Sufetula macropalpia Hampson, 1899

Species of moth

Sufetula macropalpia is a moth in the family Crambidae. It was described by George Hampson in 1899. It is found in Indonesia (Ambon Island, Banda Islands, Fergusson Island).

The wingspan is about 16 mm. The forewings are fuscous with an obscure whitish subbasal patch and slight white marks representing the antemedial line. There is a lunulate (crescent-shaped) medial white patch in and below the cell, as well as two discocellular points. There are also traces of a postmedial line, as well as a submarginal waved line and a black marginal line interrupted by a white patch below the middle. The hindwings have a white base, a broad white antemedial band, a patch beyond the cell, four submarginal spots and a black marginal line interrupted by white patches between the middle and anal angle.
