= Sufetula polystrialis =

Scientific classification
- Kingdom: Animalia
- Phylum: Arthropoda
- Clade: Pancrustacea
- Class: Insecta
- Order: Lepidoptera
- Family: Crambidae
- Genus: Sufetula
- Species: S. polystrialis

Binomial name
- Sufetula polystrialis Hampson, 1912

Species of moth

Sufetula polystrialis is a moth in the family Crambidae. It was described by George Hampson in 1912. It is found on the Louisiade Islands.

The wingspan is 18–20 mm. The forewings are ochreous white tinged and irrorated with brown, the costal area suffused with brown. There is a short brown streak on the base of the median nervure and an oblique whitish subbasal striga from the costa with a slight blackish streak below the costa from it to the antemedial line, which is whitish, oblique and defined by a black line on the outer side from the costa to the submedian fold, then bent inwards to the base of the inner margin and defined by a brown fascia above. The medial part of the costa has two whitish semicircular marks, a small black discoidal spot and whitish streaks with diffused dark streaks between them on veins 7, 6, 5 and 4 to the postmedial line, which is whitish defined by a black line on the inner side, expanding at the costa. There is a triangular patch of blackish suffusion beyond it at the costa and some fuscous and brown suffusion below its retracted portion. There is a very oblique white streak defined on each side by brown from the submedian fold beyond the middle to the middle of the inner margin, as well as a black subterminal line. The hindwings are ochreous white, tinged and irrorated with brown. There is an oblique diffused blackish medial line defined by white on the outer side on the inner area, as well as a very oblique white postmedial line defined on the inner side by a black line and on the outer by dark suffusion. There is a black subterminal line defined by white on the inner side.
