= Auchmophoba =

Scientific classification
- Kingdom: Animalia
- Phylum: Arthropoda
- Clade: Pancrustacea
- Class: Insecta
- Order: Lepidoptera
- Family: Crambidae
- Subfamily: Spilomelinae
- Genus: Auchmophoba; Turner, 1913

Synonyms
- Petta Warren, 1895

Genus of moths

Auchmophoba is a genus of moths of the family Crambidae.

== Species ==
- Auchmophoba alternata (Warren, 1895)
- Auchmophoba costastrigalis (Hampson, 1896)

== Former species ==
- Auchmophoba tynnuta Turner, 1913
- Auchmophoba sufetuloides Hampson, 1919
