= Lathroteles =

Scientific classification
- Kingdom: Animalia
- Phylum: Arthropoda
- Clade: Pancrustacea
- Class: Insecta
- Order: Lepidoptera
- Family: Crambidae
- Subfamily: Lathrotelinae
- Genus: Lathroteles; J. F. G. Clarke, 1971

Genus of moths

Lathroteles is a monotypic moth genus of the family Crambidae described by John Frederick Gates Clarke in 1971. It contains only one species, Lathroteles obscura J. F. G. Clarke, 1971, which is found on Rapa Iti in French Polynesia.

Lathroteles is the nominate genus of the subfamily Lathrotelinae.
