= Glaucoclystis sinuosoides =

Scientific classification
- Kingdom: Animalia
- Phylum: Arthropoda
- Clade: Pancrustacea
- Class: Insecta
- Order: Lepidoptera
- Family: Geometridae
- Genus: Glaucoclystis
- Species: G. sinuosoides

Binomial name
- Glaucoclystis sinuosoides Holloway, 1997

Species of moth

Glaucoclystis sinuosoides is a moth in the family Geometridae. It is found on Borneo. The habitat consists of lowland dipterocarp forests.
