= Orthoraphis metasticta =

Scientific classification
- Kingdom: Animalia
- Phylum: Arthropoda
- Class: Insecta
- Order: Lepidoptera
- Family: Crambidae
- Genus: Orthoraphis
- Species: O. metasticta

Binomial name
- Orthoraphis metasticta Hampson, 1899

Species of moth

Orthoraphis metasticta is a moth in the family Crambidae. It was described by George Hampson in 1899. It is found in India (Khasis) and the Philippines.
