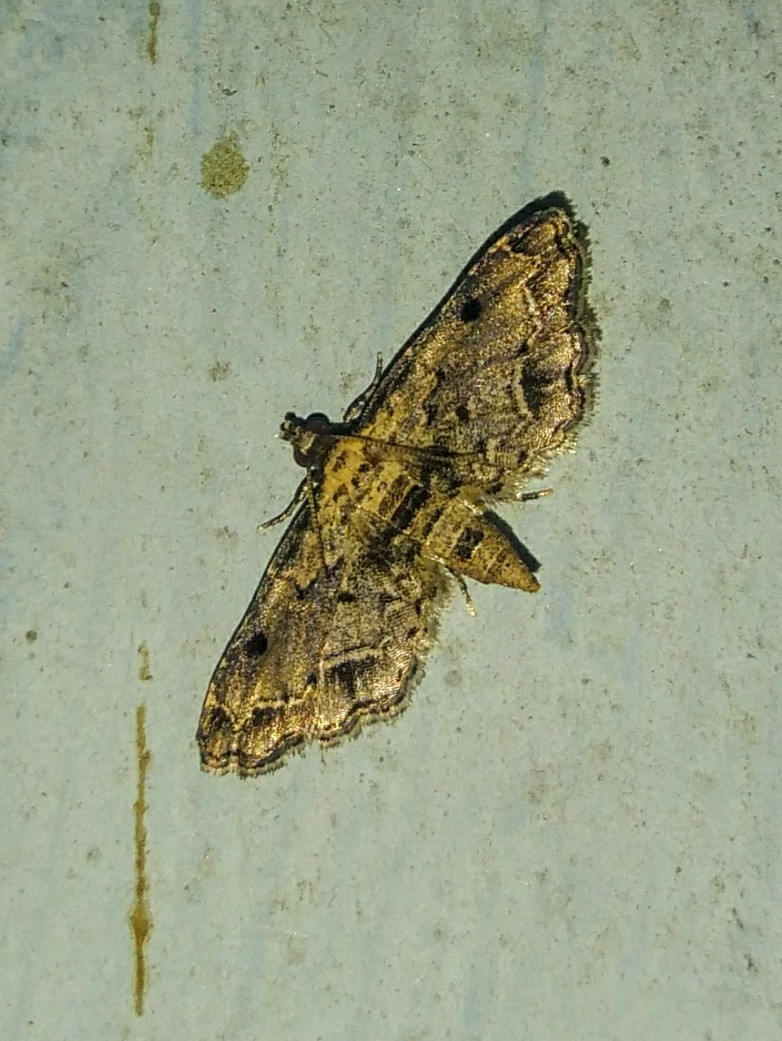
- Sufetula sp. from Sri Lanka

Scientific classification
- Kingdom: Animalia
- Phylum: Arthropoda
- Class: Insecta
- Order: Lepidoptera
- Family: Crambidae
- Subfamily: Lathrotelinae
- Genus: Sufetula; Walker, 1859

Synonyms
- Loetrina Walker, 1863; Mirobriga Walker, 1863; Nannomorpha Turner, 1908; Perforadix Seín, 1930; Pseudochoreutes Snellen, 1880; Pseudochoreutis Hampson, 1899; Safetula Hampson, 1893

= Sufetula (moth) =

Genus of moths

Sufetula is a genus of moths of the family Crambidae.

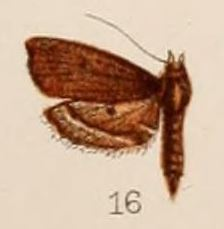
Sufetula nitidalis

== Species ==
Where known, distribution records are given.

- Sufetula alychnopa (Turner, 1908)
- Sufetula anania Solis, Hayden, Sanabria, Gonzalez, Ujueta & Gulbronson, 2019 (from Costa Rica)
- Sufetula bilinealis Hampson, 1912
- Sufetula boileauae Nel, 2022
- Sufetula carbonalis Hayden, 2013
- Sufetula chagosalis (T. B. Fletcher, 1910) (from Chagos)
- Sufetula choreutalis (Snellen, 1879)
- Sufetula culshawi Young, Hall, Richards & Lees, 2025
- Sufetula cyanolepis Hampson, 1912
- Sufetula diminutalis (Walker, 1866) (from the Americas)
- Sufetula dulcinalis (Snellen, 1899)
- Sufetula elfridea Müller, Hayden & Léger in Müller, Hayden, Lees & Léger, 2025 (from the Philippines)
- Sufetula falcata Müller, Hayden & Léger in Müller, Hayden, Lees & Léger, 2025 (from the Philippines)
- Sufetula fulgurata Müller, Hayden & Léger in Müller, Hayden, Lees & Léger, 2025 (from the Philippines)
- Sufetula gigantea Müller, Hayden & Léger in Müller, Hayden, Lees & Léger, 2025 (from the Philippines)
- Sufetula grumalis Schaus, 1920
- Sufetula hemiophthalma (Meyrick, 1884)
- Sufetula hypocharopa Dyar, 1914
- Sufetula hypochiralis Dyar, 1914
- Sufetula macropalpia Hampson, 1899
- Sufetula melanophthalma E. Hering, 1901
- Sufetula metallias (Meyrick, 1897)
- Sufetula minimalis T. B. Fletcher, 1910 (from Seychelles)
- Sufetula minuscula Inoue, 1996
- Sufetula minuta Müller, Hayden & Léger in Müller, Hayden, Lees & Léger, 2025 (from the Philippines)
- Sufetula monticola Müller, Hayden & Léger in Müller, Hayden, Lees & Léger, 2025 (from the Philippines)
- Sufetula nigrescens Hampson, 1912 (from Africa and Madagascar)
- Sufetula nitidalis Hampson, 1908 (from India)
- Sufetula obliquistrialis Hampson, 1912
- Sufetula oculalis Müller, Hayden & Léger in Müller, Hayden, Lees & Léger, 2025 (from the Philippines)
- Sufetula paula (West, 1931)
- Sufetula polystrialis Hampson, 1912
- Sufetula rectifascialis Hampson, 1896 (from Sri Lanka)
- Sufetula sacchari (Seín, 1930)
- Sufetula serrata Müller, Hayden & Léger in Müller, Hayden, Lees & Léger, 2025 (from the Philippines)
- Sufetula sufetulodes (Hampson, 1917)
- Sufetula sunidesalis Walker, 1859 (from Sri Lanka)
- Sufetula sythoffi (Snellen, 1899)
- Sufetula trichophysetis Hampson, 1912 (from Ghana)

== Former species ==
- Sufetula brunnealis Hampson, 1917, currently placed in Diplopseustis
- Sufetula pygmaea Hampson, 1912, now placed in the Nolidae genus Nola
- Sufetula sufetuloides (Hampson, 1917), currently placed in Auchmophoba
