= Glaucoclystis =

Scientific classification
- Kingdom: Animalia
- Phylum: Arthropoda
- Clade: Pancrustacea
- Class: Insecta
- Order: Lepidoptera
- Family: Geometridae
- Tribe: Eupitheciini
- Genus: Glaucoclystis; Holloway, 1997

Genus of moths

Glaucoclystis is a genus of moths in the family Geometridae.

== Species ==
- Glaucoclystis acygonia (Swinhoe, 1895)
- Glaucoclystis albicetrata Prout, 1958
- Glaucoclystis azumai (Inoue, 1971)
- Glaucoclystis expedita (Prout, 1958)
- Glaucoclystis gonias (Turner, 1904)
- Glaucoclystis griseorufa (Hampson, 1898)
- Glaucoclystis immixtaria (Walker, 1862)
- Glaucoclystis hyperocha (Prout, 1958)
- Glaucoclystis polyclealis (Walker, 1859)
- Glaucoclystis polyodonta (Swinhoe, 1895)
- Glaucoclystis satoi Inoue, 2002
- Glaucoclystis sinuosa (Swinhoe, 1895)
- Glaucoclystis sinuosoides Holloway, 1997
- Glaucoclystis spinosa (Inoue, 1971)
