= Sufetula melanophthalma =

Scientific classification
- Kingdom: Animalia
- Phylum: Arthropoda
- Clade: Pancrustacea
- Class: Insecta
- Order: Lepidoptera
- Family: Crambidae
- Genus: Sufetula
- Species: S. melanophthalma

Binomial name
- Sufetula melanophthalma E. Hering, 1901

Species of moth

Sufetula melanophthalma is a moth in the family Crambidae. It was described by E. Hering in 1901. It is found in Indonesia (Sumatra).
