= Synclera subtessellalis =

Scientific classification
- Kingdom: Animalia
- Phylum: Arthropoda
- Class: Insecta
- Order: Lepidoptera
- Family: Crambidae
- Genus: Synclera
- Species: S. subtessellalis

Binomial name
- Synclera subtessellalis (Walker, 1865)

Synonyms
- Botys subtessellalis Walker, 1865

Species of moth

Synclera subtessellalis is a moth in the family Crambidae. It was described by Francis Walker in 1865. It is found in the Democratic Republic of the Congo (Katanga, North Kivu, East Kasai, West Kasai, Equateur) and India.
