= Diplopseustis selenalis =

Scientific classification
- Domain: Eukaryota
- Kingdom: Animalia
- Phylum: Arthropoda
- Class: Insecta
- Order: Lepidoptera
- Family: Crambidae
- Genus: Diplopseustis
- Species: D. selenalis

Binomial name
- Diplopseustis selenalis Hampson, 1906

Species of moth

Diplopseustis selenalis is a moth in the family Crambidae. It was described by George Hampson in 1906 and it is found in New Guinea, where it has been recorded from Fergusson Island.
