= Sufetula hypocharopa =

Scientific classification
- Kingdom: Animalia
- Phylum: Arthropoda
- Clade: Pancrustacea
- Class: Insecta
- Order: Lepidoptera
- Family: Crambidae
- Genus: Sufetula
- Species: S. hypocharopa

Binomial name
- Sufetula hypocharopa Dyar, 1914

Species of moth

Sufetula hypocharopa is a moth in the family Crambidae. It was described by Harrison Gray Dyar Jr. in 1914, and, is found in Panama.

Its wingspan is about 9.5 mm. The forewings have a pale orange-brown margin, lined on both sides with black. The terminal line is double and filled with this color. There is a patch of orange brown at the apex. The hindwings have a narrow outer border with a broad and diffused discal shade.
