= Synclera rotundalis =

Scientific classification
- Kingdom: Animalia
- Phylum: Arthropoda
- Class: Insecta
- Order: Lepidoptera
- Family: Crambidae
- Genus: Synclera
- Species: S. rotundalis

Binomial name
- Synclera rotundalis (Hampson, 1893)

Synonyms
- Bocchoris rotundalis Hampson, 1893

Species of moth

Synclera rotundalis is a moth in the family Crambidae. It was described by George Hampson in 1893. It is found in India and Sri Lanka.
