= Sufetula choreutalis =

Scientific classification
- Kingdom: Animalia
- Phylum: Arthropoda
- Clade: Pancrustacea
- Class: Insecta
- Order: Lepidoptera
- Family: Crambidae
- Genus: Sufetula
- Species: S. choreutalis

Binomial name
- Sufetula choreutalis (Snellen, 1879)

Synonyms
- Pseudochoreutes choreutalis Snellen, 1879; Sufetula chloreutalis Whalley, 1962

Species of moth

Sufetula choreutalis is a moth in the family Crambidae. It was described by Snellen in 1879. It is found in Indonesia (Sulawesi).
