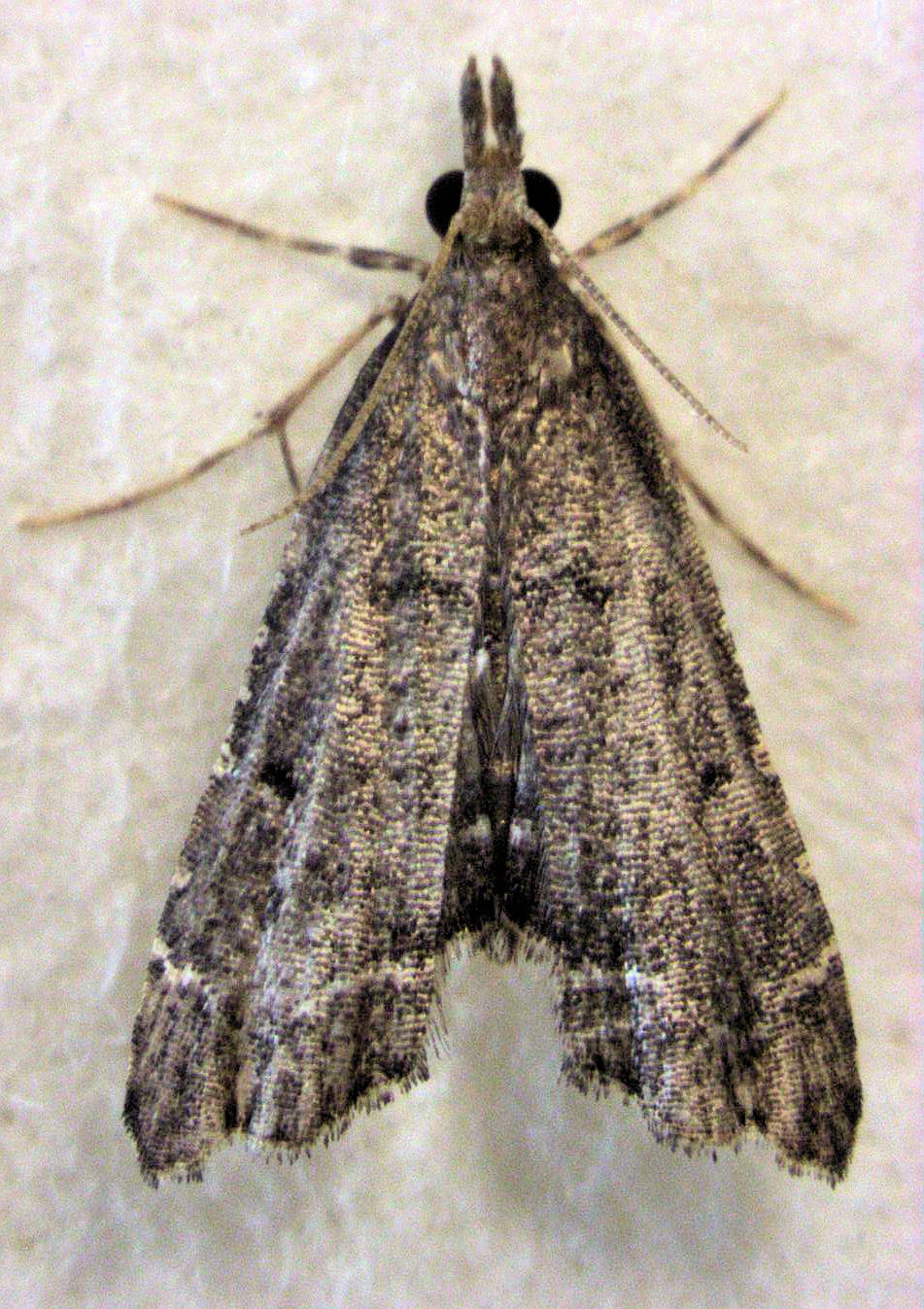
- Diplopseustis perieresalis

Scientific classification
- Kingdom: Animalia
- Phylum: Arthropoda
- Clade: Pancrustacea
- Class: Insecta
- Order: Lepidoptera
- Family: Crambidae
- Subfamily: Lathrotelinae
- Genus: Diplopseustis; Meyrick, 1884

= Diplopseustis =

Genus of moths

Diplopseustis is a genus of snout moths in the subfamily Lathrotelinae of the family Crambidae. It was described in 1884 by Edward Meyrick with Cymoriza minima Butler, 1881 as its type species, which is now considered a synonym of Diplopseustis perieresalis.

The genus currently comprises seven species distributed in the Afrotropical, Indomalayan and Australasian realm.

== Species ==
- Diplopseustis constellata Warren, 1896
- Diplopseustis nigerialis Hampson, 1906
- Diplopseustis pallidalis Warren, 1896
- Diplopseustis perieresalis (Walker, 1859)
- Diplopseustis prophetica Meyrick, 1887
- Diplopseustis selenalis Hampson, 1906

== Former species ==
Diplopseustis metallias Meyrick, 1897 is now placed in Sufetula.
