= Stictoptera hironsi =

Scientific classification
- Kingdom: Animalia
- Phylum: Arthropoda
- Clade: Pancrustacea
- Class: Insecta
- Order: Lepidoptera
- Superfamily: Noctuoidea
- Family: Euteliidae
- Genus: Stictoptera
- Species: S. hironsi

Binomial name
- Stictoptera hironsi Barnett, Emms & Holloway, 1998

Species of moth

Stictoptera hironsi, the St. Valentine's Day moth, is a moth of the family Euteliidae. It was described by L. K. Barnett, C. W. Emms and J. D. Holloway in 1998 and is endemic to the Chagos Archipelago in the Indian Ocean.

The larvae probably feed on Calophyllum inophyllum.

== Etymology ==
The capture of one of the paratypes on February 14 led to the species being described as the St Valentine's Day moth.
