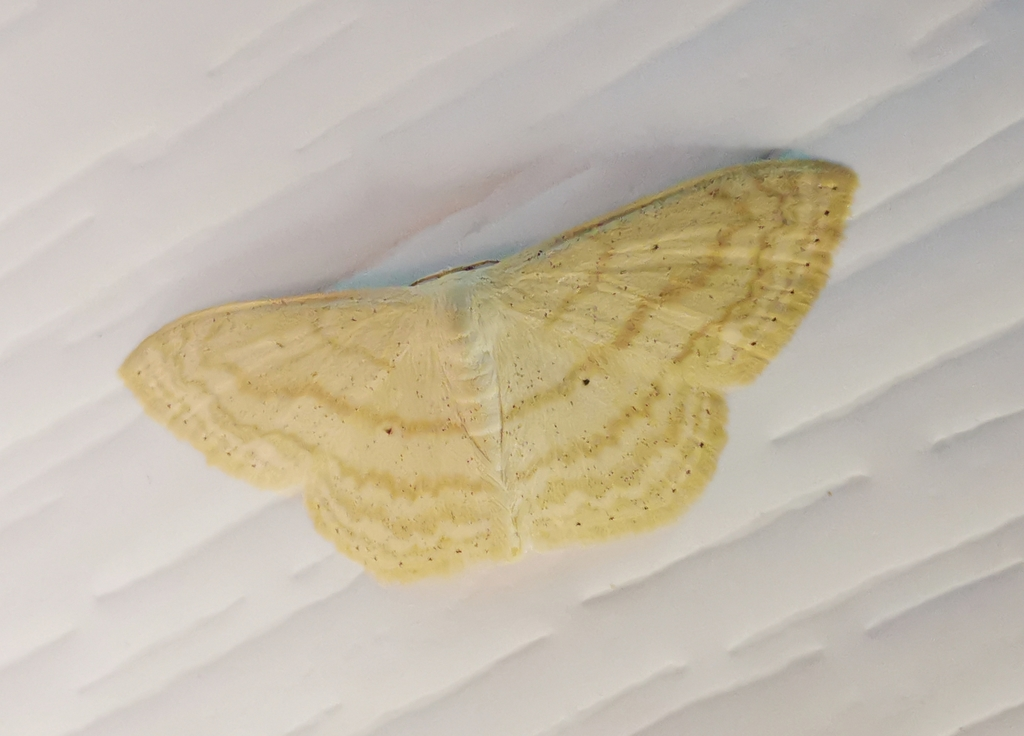

Scientific classification
- Kingdom: Animalia
- Phylum: Arthropoda
- Class: Insecta
- Order: Lepidoptera
- Family: Geometridae
- Genus: Scopula
- Species: S. actuaria

Binomial name
- Scopula actuaria (Walker, 1861)

Synonyms
- Acidalia actuaria Walker, 1861; Ptychopoda nigranalis Warren, 1896; Craspedia parumnotata Warren, 1896; Scopula actuaria sheljuzhkoi Wiltshire, 1967

= Scopula actuaria =

Species of geometer moths in subfamily Sterrhinae

Scopula actuaria is a moth of the family Geometridae. It was described by Francis Walker in 1861. It is found throughout the Oriental tropics of India, Sri Lanka, from Afghanistan and Taiwan to the southern Moluccas and Timor. It is also found on the Chagos Archipelago.

== Description ==
Its wingspan is about 18 millimetres (0.71 in). There is a black speck at the end of the cell of each wing. The bands are reduced to minutely waved lines. The medial line excurved beyond cell of forewings, the postmedial slightly angled at vein 4 and 6 of each wing.

The larvae have been recorded on Theobroma species.

== Subspecies ==
- Scopula actuaria actuaria
- Scopula actuaria nigranalis (Warren, 1896) (Timor)
- Scopula actuaria sheljuzhkoi Wiltshire, 1967 (Oriental tropics to Taiwan, Afghanistan)
