= Sufetula chagosalis =

Scientific classification
- Kingdom: Animalia
- Phylum: Arthropoda
- Clade: Pancrustacea
- Class: Insecta
- Order: Lepidoptera
- Family: Crambidae
- Genus: Sufetula
- Species: S. chagosalis

Binomial name
- Sufetula chagosalis (T. B. Fletcher, 1910)

Synonyms
- Endotricha chagosalis T. B. Fletcher, 1910

Species of moth

Sufetula chagosalis is a moth of the family Crambidae described by Thomas Bainbrigge Fletcher in 1910. It is endemic to the Chagos Archipelago in the Indian Ocean.
