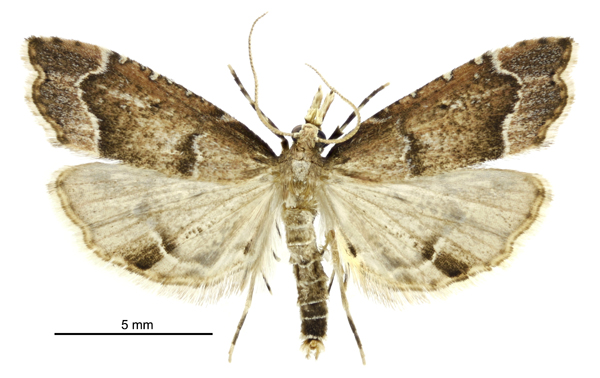

Scientific classification
- Kingdom: Animalia
- Phylum: Arthropoda
- Clade: Pancrustacea
- Class: Insecta
- Order: Lepidoptera
- Family: Crambidae
- Subfamily: Lathrotelinae; J. F. G. Clarke, 1971

Genera
- see text

= Lathrotelinae =

Subfamily of moths

Lathrotelinae is a subfamily of the pyraloid family Crambidae described by John Frederick Gates Clarke in 1971. It currently comprises 54 species in six genera.

== Description ==
Characteristic features of the Lathrotelinae are the undulating wing outline, the absent chaetosemata on the imaginal head, the completely reduced gnathos, and the male genitalia's aedeagus with a strongly spiculose "manica" on its posterior end. Lathrotelinae were suggested to be closely related to Acentropinae based on two synapomorphies in the second sternum of the abdomen, but a phylogenetic study of Crambidae based on genetic data found the subfamily to be the sister group of the fern-feeding Musotiminae.

== Food plants ==
Little is known on the larval stage of Lathrotelinae. The few known larvae feed on monocotyledon plants and are occasionally found as pest species on oil palms and sugarcane.

== Systematics ==
Until the mid-2010s, Lathrotelinae have been treated within the subfamily Spilomelinae. However, recent studies concluded that Lathroteles obscura J.F.G Clarke, 1971 and several other species are misplaced in Spilomelinae and require a separate subfamily. According to the International Code of Zoological Nomenclature's Principle of Priority, the family group name Lathrotelidae J.F.G. Clarke, 1971 applies to this subfamily.

Lathrotelinae currently includes the following genera:

- Acropentias Meyrick, 1890 – 2 species
- Diplopseustis Meyrick, 1884 – 7 species
- Diplopseustoides Guillermet, 2013 – 1 species
- Lathroteles J.F.G. Clarke, 1971 – 1 species
- Orthoraphis Hampson, 1896 – 4 species
- Sufetula Walker, 1859 – 39 species

The group has been poorly studied, and several additional species await description e.g. in the Indomalayan and Australasian region.
