= Sufetula sufetuloides =

Scientific classification
- Kingdom: Animalia
- Phylum: Arthropoda
- Clade: Pancrustacea
- Class: Insecta
- Order: Lepidoptera
- Family: Crambidae
- Genus: Sufetula
- Species: S. sufetuloides

Binomial name
- Sufetula sufetuloides (Hampson, 1919)

Synonyms
- Auchmophoba sufetuloides Hampson, 1919

Species of moth

Sufetula sufetuloides is a moth in the family Crambidae. It was described by George Hampson in 1919. It is found in Nigeria and Sierra Leone.
