= Sufetula minimalis =

Scientific classification
- Kingdom: Animalia
- Phylum: Arthropoda
- Clade: Pancrustacea
- Class: Insecta
- Order: Lepidoptera
- Family: Crambidae
- Genus: Sufetula
- Species: S. minimalis

Binomial name
- Sufetula minimalis T. B. Fletcher, 1911

Species of moth

Sufetula minimalis is a moth of the family Crambidae. It was described by Thomas Bainbrigge Fletcher in 1911 and is found in the Chagos Archipelago and the Seychelles, both in the Indian Ocean.

The larvae have been recorded on coconut.
