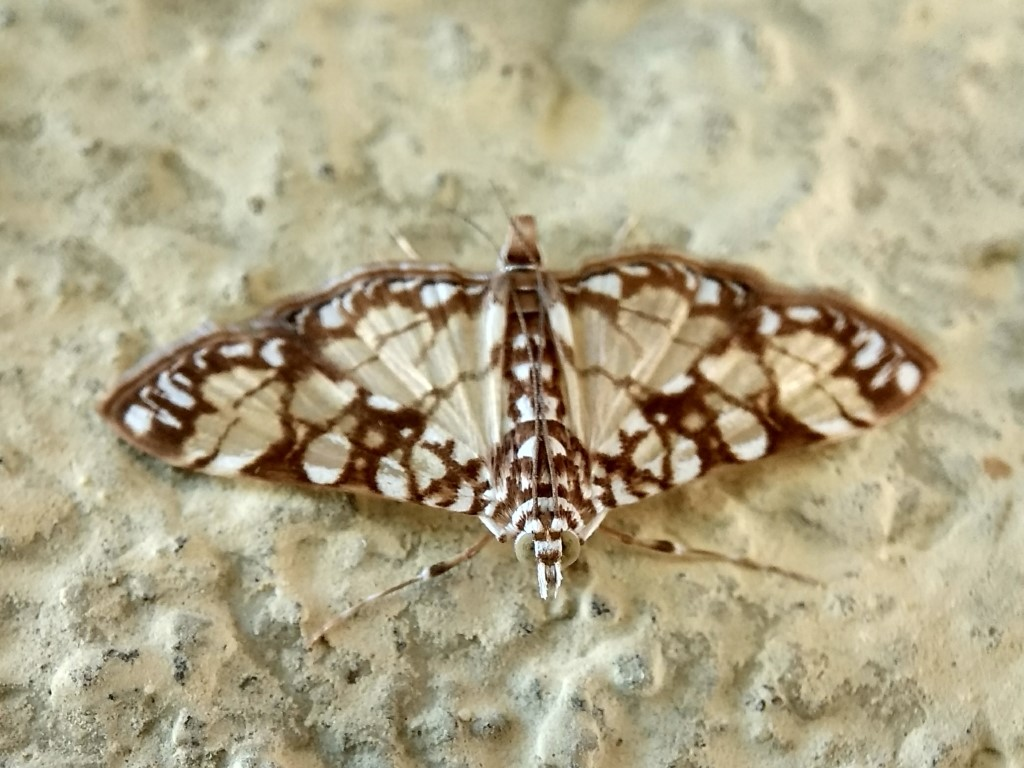

Scientific classification
- Kingdom: Animalia
- Phylum: Arthropoda
- Class: Insecta
- Order: Lepidoptera
- Family: Crambidae
- Genus: Synclera
- Species: S. univocalis

Binomial name
- Synclera univocalis (Walker, 1859)

Synonyms
- Glyphodes univocalis Walker, 1859; Pagyda univocalis

= Synclera univocalis =

Species of moth

Synclera univocalis, the jujube leaf-folder, is a moth of the family Crambidae described by Francis Walker in 1859. It is found on the Chagos Archipelago and Sri Lanka. Records from India, Burma, Yemen, Palestine, Syria and South Africa refer to other species in the genus.

The larvae feed on Zizyphus mauritiana.
