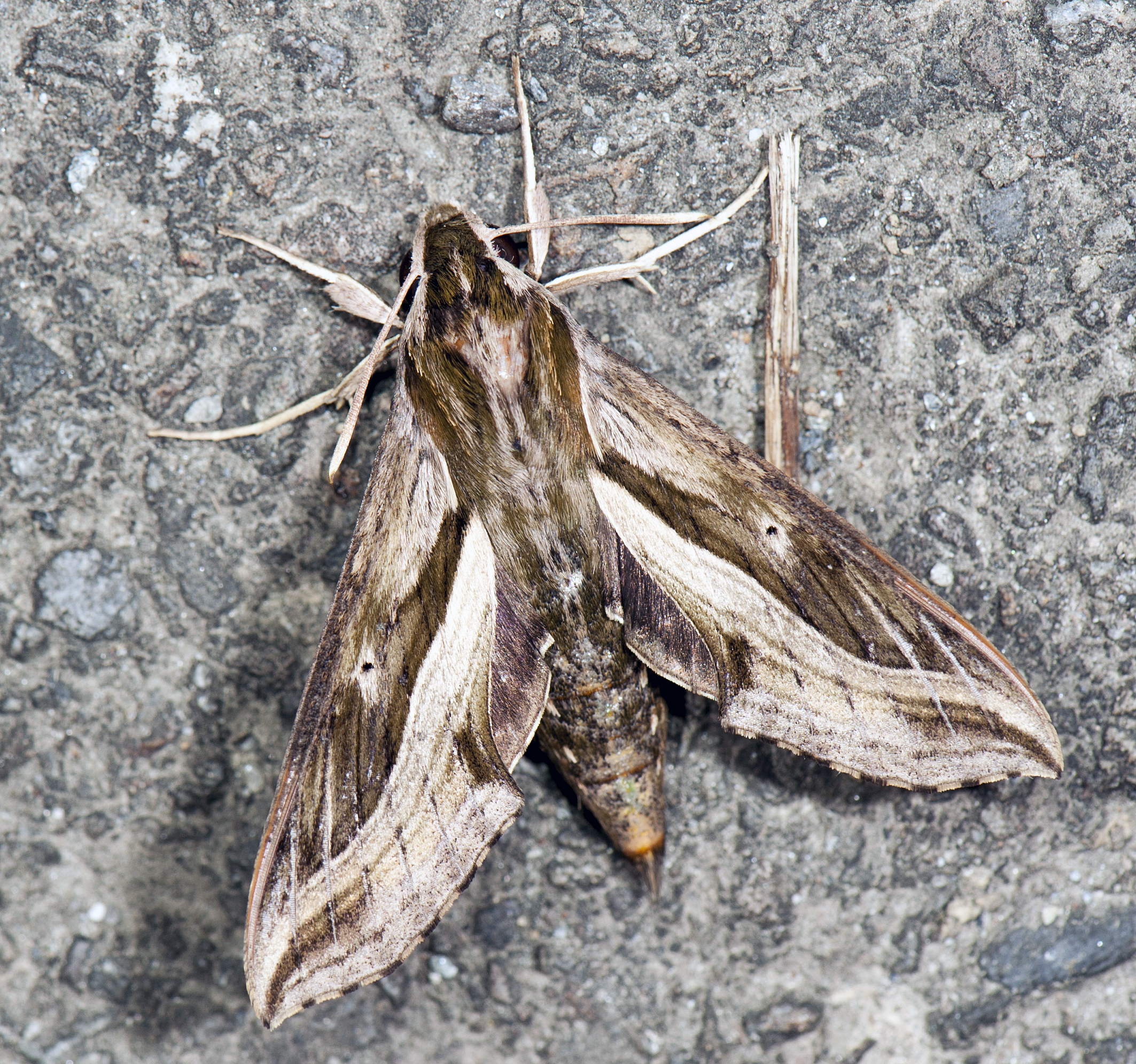

Scientific classification
- Kingdom: Animalia
- Phylum: Arthropoda
- Class: Insecta
- Order: Lepidoptera
- Family: Sphingidae
- Genus: Hippotion
- Species: H. velox

Binomial name
- Hippotion velox (Fabricius, 1793)

Synonyms
- Sphinx velox Fabricius, 1793; Sphinx phoenyx Herrich-Schäffer, 1856; Sphinx vigil Guérin-Méneville, 1843; Panacra rosea Rothschild, 1894; Panacra pseudovigil Rothschild, 1894; Panacra lignaria Walker, 1856; Panacra lifuensis Rothschild, 1894; Panacra griseola Rothschild, 1894; Hippotion taiwanensis Riotte, 1975; Hippotion tainanensis Clark, 1932; Hippotion obanawae Matsumura, 1909; Hippotion noel Clark, 1923; Hippotion japenum Riotte, 1994; Hippotion beddoesii Clark, 1922; Choerocampa yorkii Boisduval, 1875; Chaerocampa swinhoei Moore, 1866

= Hippotion velox =

Dark striated hawkmoth

Species of moth

Hippotion velox, the dark striated hawkmoth, is a species of sphingid moth or the family Sphingidae. The species was described by Johan Christian Fabricius in 1793.

== Distribution ==
It is found throughout the Indo-Australian tropics of India, Sri Lanka and east to Fiji and New Caledonia, north to Hong Kong, Taiwan, Sumatra southern Japan and northern Australia from Western Australia to Queensland.

== Description ==
The wingspan is 54–76 mm. The head and thorax are brown with pale lateral streaks. The abdomen is brown with numerous dark strigae and pairs of pale lateral strigae on each segment. The forewings are brown without any silvery makings, thus differ from T. celerio. Hindwings are smoky brown with traces of a darker submarginal line.

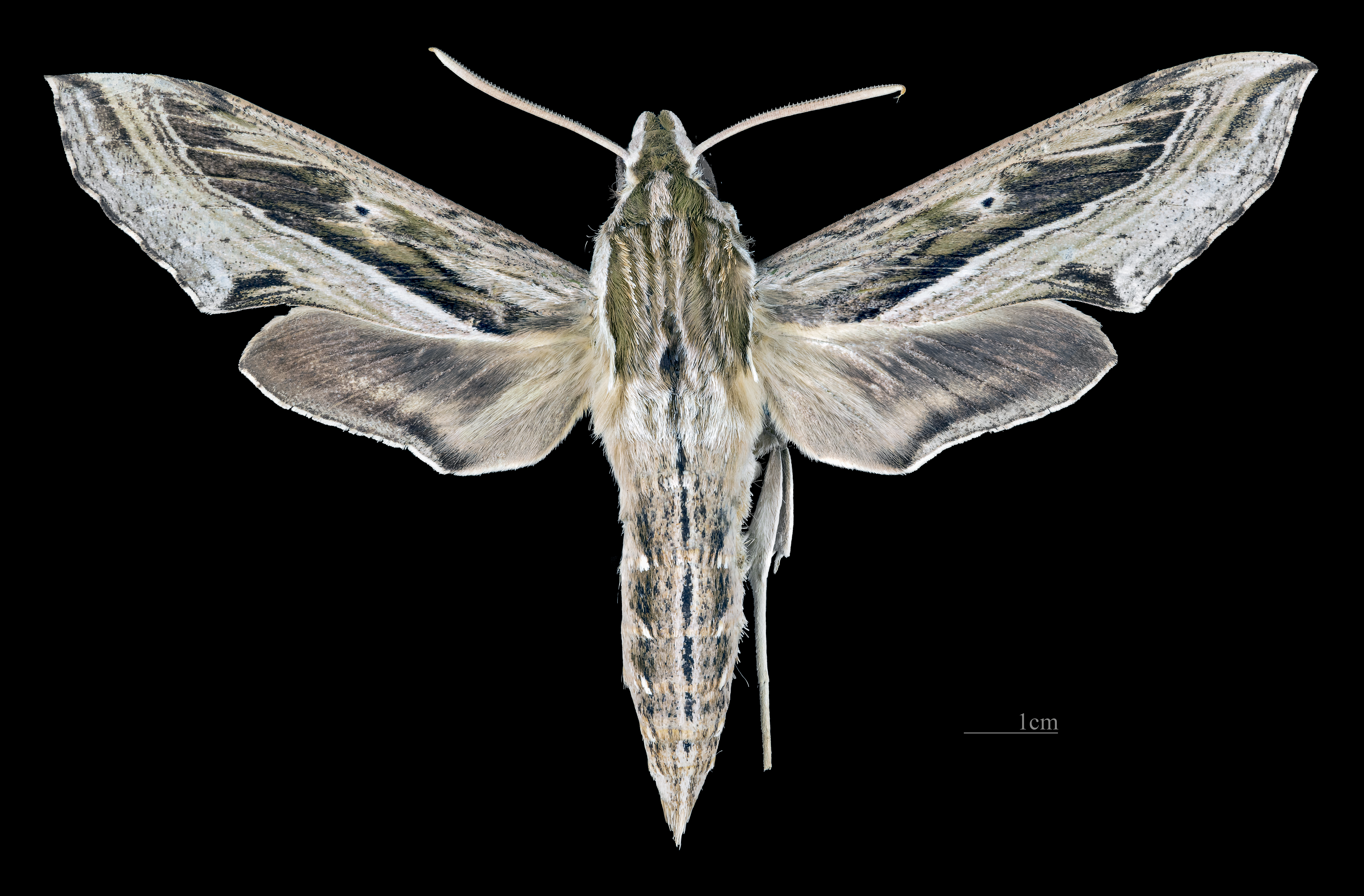
Male dorsal

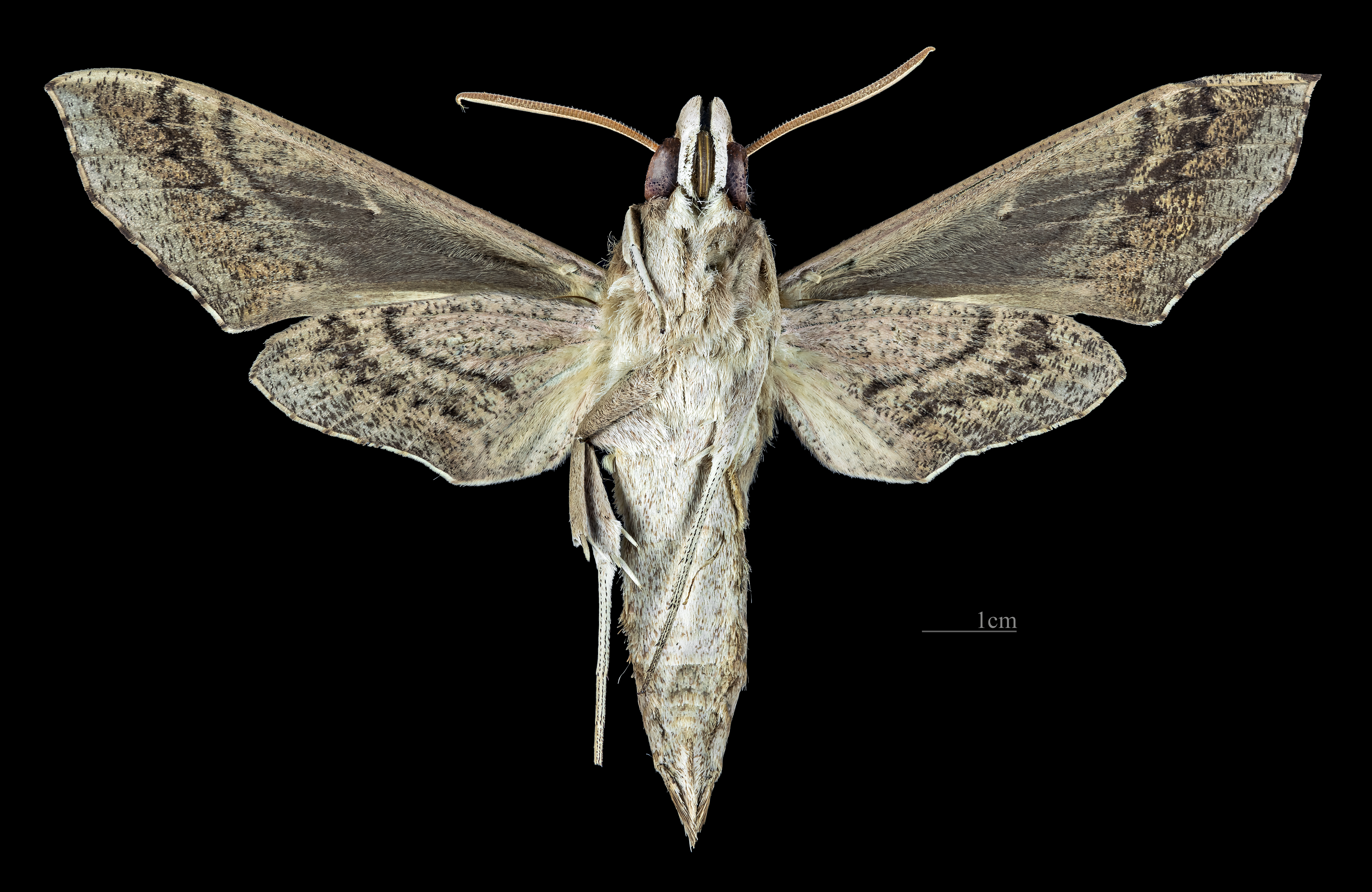
Male ventral

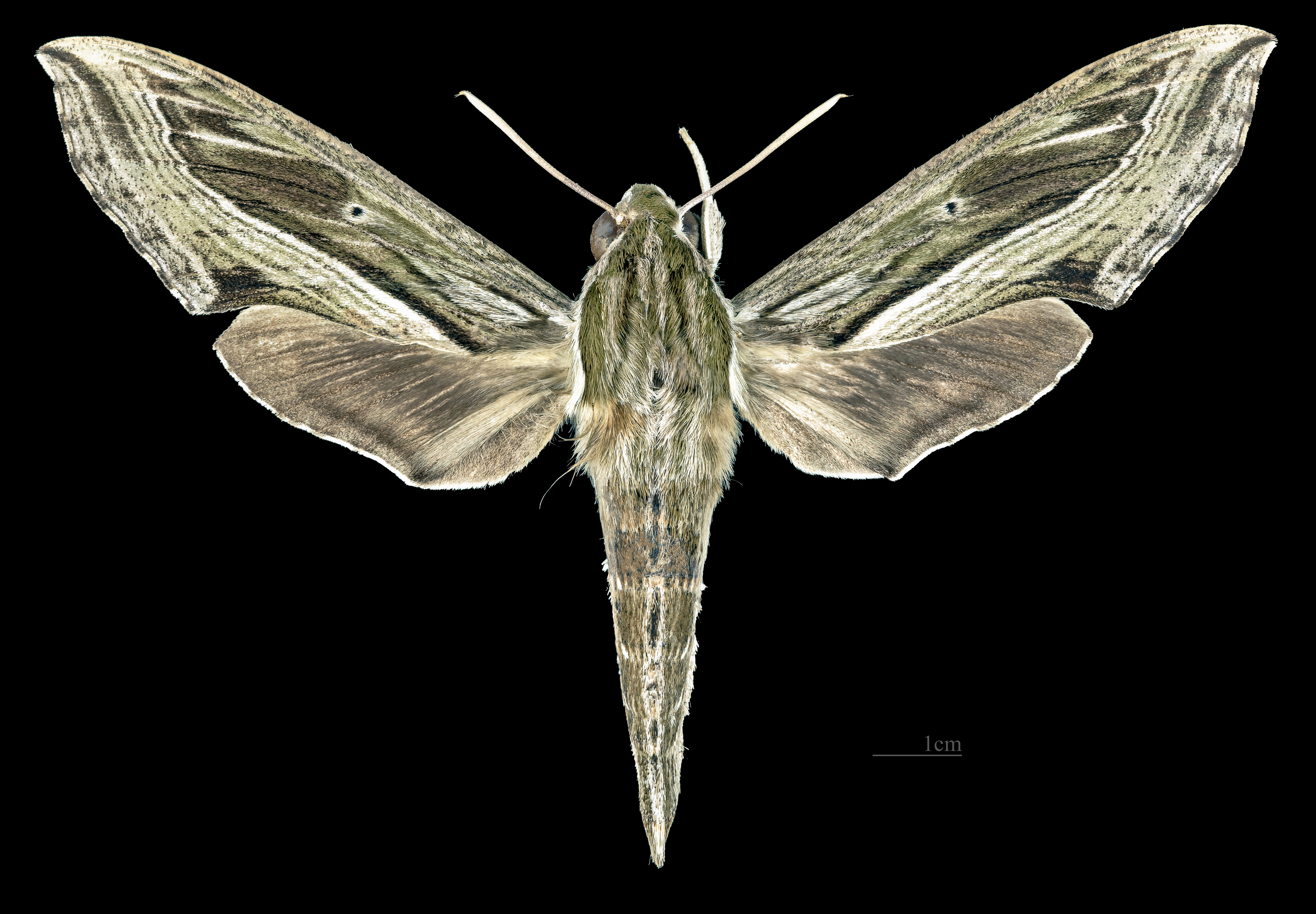
Female dorsal

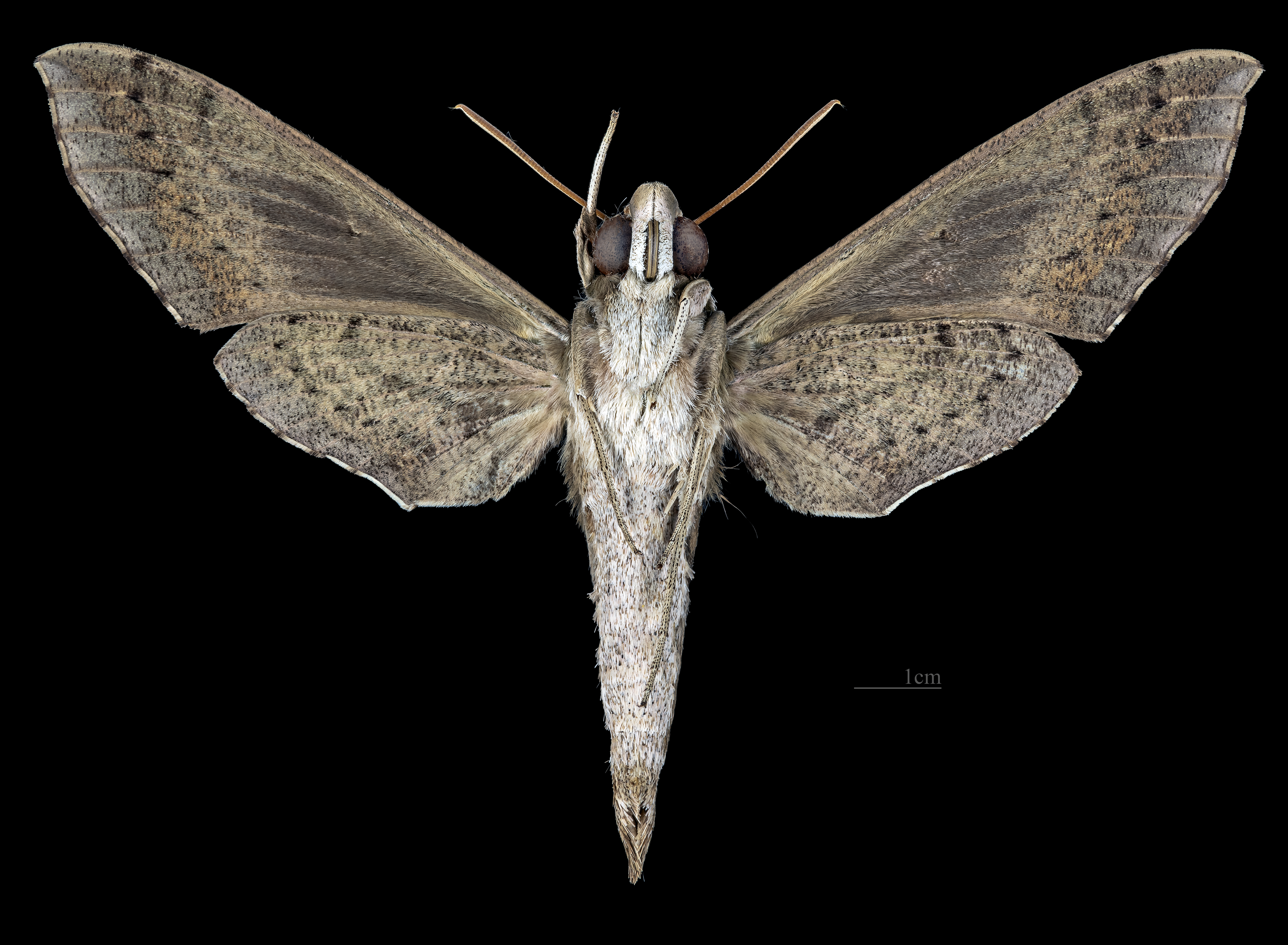
Female ventral

The final instar occurs in two forms, green and dark. Larvae are pale green or brown with dorsal black dots. There is an eyespot on the 4th somite which is blue centered with yellow in the green form. An ochreous black ring is present in brown form. There is a subdorsal line from 5th to 11th somite. Horn is purplish in the green form. Pupa is bone colored, closely spotted and speckled with brown and some black dots.

The larvae have been recorded on Araceae, Convolvulaceae, Nyctaginaceae and Rubiaceae species, including Ipomoea, Boerhavia and Morinda species.
