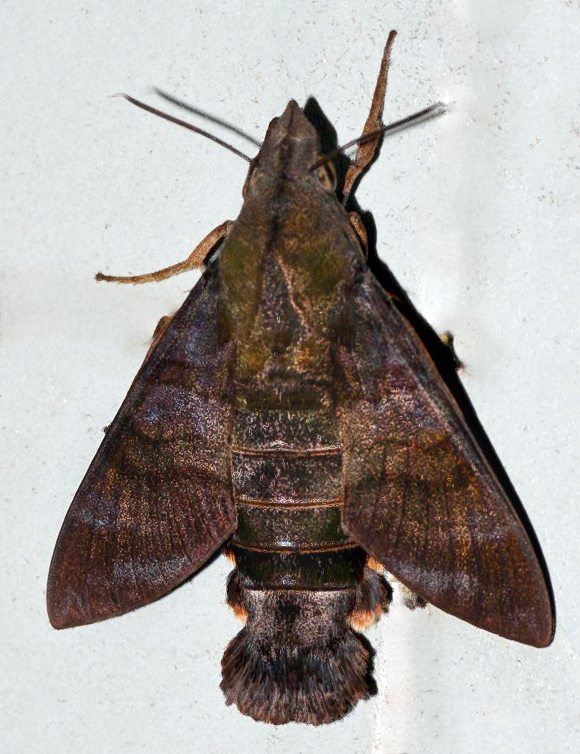

Scientific classification
- Kingdom: Animalia
- Phylum: Arthropoda
- Class: Insecta
- Order: Lepidoptera
- Family: Sphingidae
- Genus: Macroglossum
- Species: M. corythus

Binomial name
- Macroglossum corythus Walker 1856

Synonyms
- Macroglossum oceanicum Rothschild & Jordan, 1915; Macroglossa luteata Butler, 1875; Macroglossum platyxanthum Rothschild & Jordan, 1903; Macroglossum fuscicauda Rothschild & Jordan, 1903; Macroglossa fulvicaudata Butler, 1882; Macroglossum novebudensis Clark, 1926; Macroglossum novirlandum D'Abrera, [1986]; Macroglossa pylene Felder, 1861; Macroglossa cyniris Boisduval, [1875]; Macroglossa phlegeton Boisduval, [1875]; Macroglossa motacilla Boisduval, [1875]; Macroglossa approximans Lucas, 1891; Macroglossa labrosa Swinhoe, 1892; Macroglossa moluccensis Rothschild, 1894; Macroglossum xanthurus Rothschild & Jordan, 1903

= Macroglossum corythus =

Species of moth

Macroglossum corythus is a species of hawk moth of the family Sphingidae. It was described by Francis Walker in 1856 and is found throughout the Indo-Australian tropics east to New Caledonia.

== Description ==
The wingspan is 50–66 mm. The coloration is varying slightly in subspecies and climate of the country. Head, thorax and abdomen is rufus in color. Abdomen is without the lateral black marks on distal segments. The anal tufts are ruddy at tips. Forewings with all lines are obsolescent, where the postmedial lines less bent. The markings being reddish and ill-defined. Hindwings with the band are pure yellow and band is narrow.

Larva is dark violet brown with dorsal specks. There is a subdorsal yellow line on the 2nd and 4th somites and 10th and 11th somites. The horn is long and tuberculate. In a later stage, there are yellow and olive-brown transverse dorsal lines and yellow lateral spots. Larvae have been recorded from Loganiaceae and Rubiaceae species. Pupa is bone colored with a black dorsal stripe on the frons and thorax.

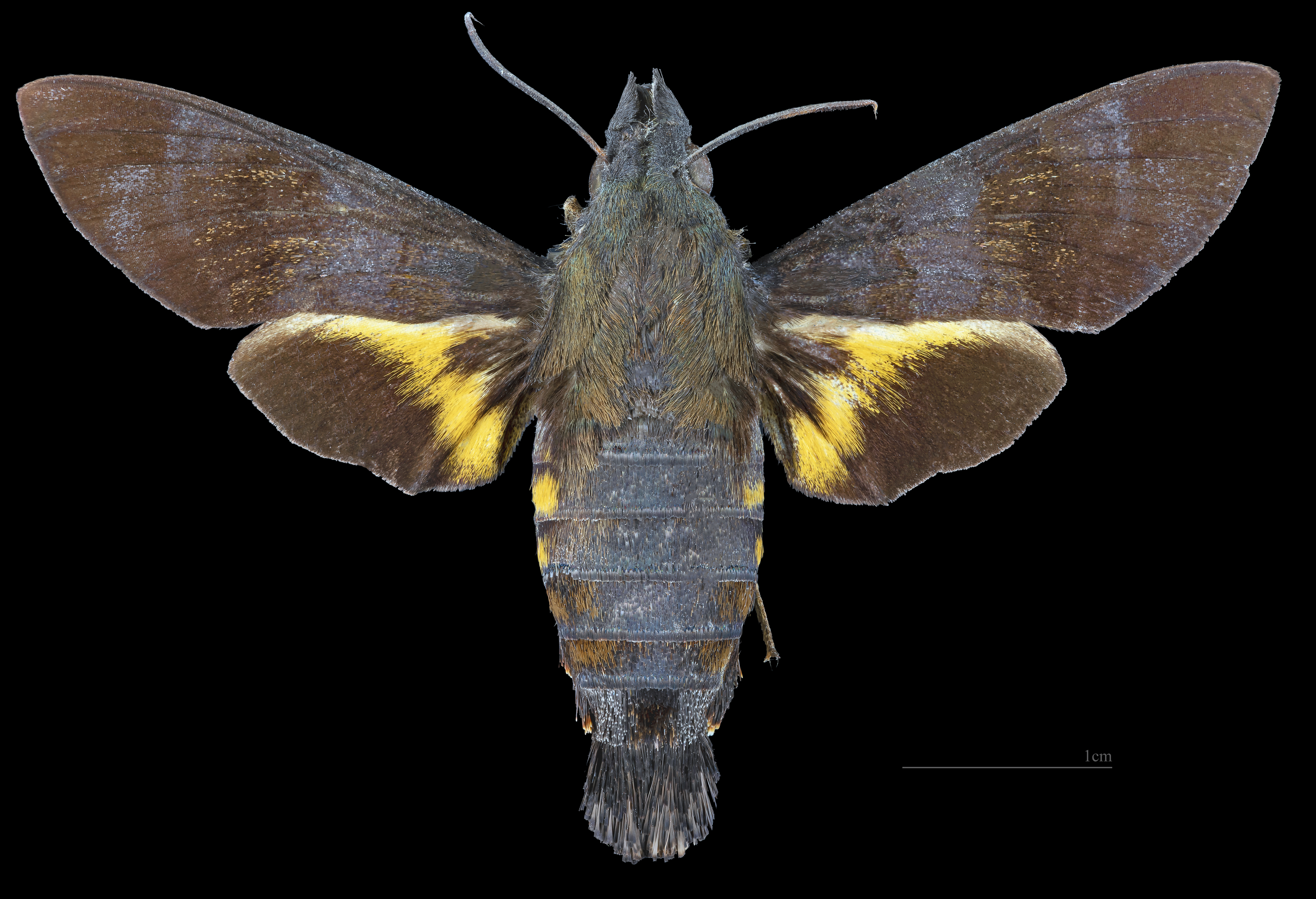
Macroglossum corythus ♂

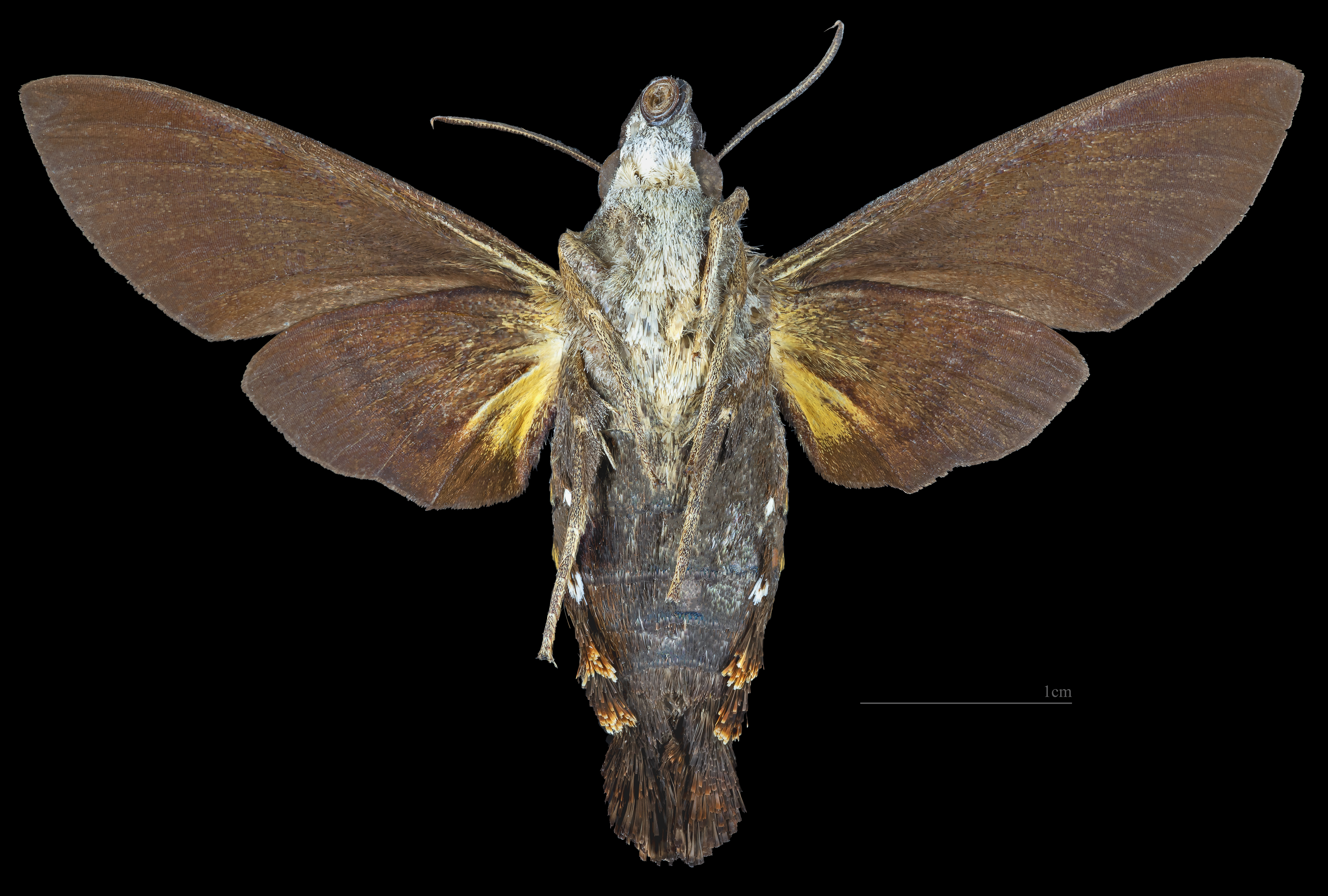
Macroglossum corythus ♂ △

== Subspecies ==
- Macroglossum corythus corythus (Sri Lanka, southern India)
- Macroglossum corythus luteata Butler, 1875 (north-eastern India, Bangladesh, Andaman and Nicobar Islands, Thailand, eastern and southern China, Taiwan, Japan (Tsushima Island), Malaysia (Peninsular, Sarawak, Sabah), Indonesia (Sumatra, Java, Kalimantan, Flores, Sumba, Sulawesi), the Philippines (Palawan, Mindanao, Luzon), Vietnam)
- Macroglossum corythus oceanicum (Rothschild & Jordan, 1915) (Chagos)
- Macroglossum corythus platyxanthum Rothschild & Jordan, 1903 (southern Japan)
- Macroglossum corythus xanthurus Rothschild & Jordan, 1903 (Tenimber)
- Macroglossum corythus pylene Felder, 1861 (New Guinea, Amboina, Buru, Moluccas)
- Macroglossum corythus novirlandum D'Abrera, 1986 (Bismarck islands)
- Macroglossum corythus novebudensis Clark, 1926 (New Hebrides)
- Macroglossum corythus fulvicaudata Butler, 1882 (New Britain)
- Macroglossum corythus fuscicauda Rothschild & Jordan, 1903 (Loyalty Islands)

Macroglossum corythus luteata and Macroglossum corythus oceanicum are treated as species (Macroglossum luteata and Macroglossum oceanicum) by some authors.
