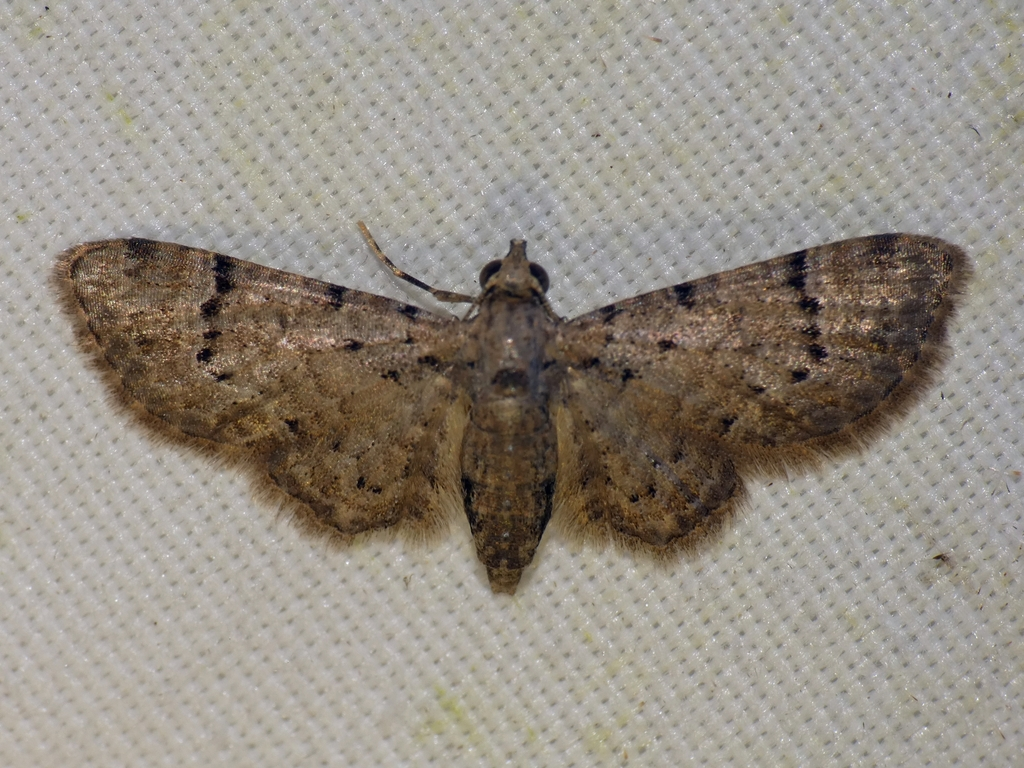

Scientific classification
- Kingdom: Animalia
- Phylum: Arthropoda
- Class: Insecta
- Order: Lepidoptera
- Family: Geometridae
- Genus: Glaucoclystis
- Species: G. immixtaria

Binomial name
- Glaucoclystis immixtaria (Walker, 1862)

Synonyms
- Eupithecia immixtaria Walker, 1862; Chloroclystis immixtaria; Chloroclystis ablechra Turner, 1904

= Glaucoclystis immixtaria =

Species of moth

Glaucoclystis immixtaria is a moth of the family Geometridae described by Francis Walker in 1862. It is known only from Sri Lanka, the Chagos Archipelago, Queensland and Fiji. It could prove to be more widely distributed, with populations in more seasonally dry habitats such as Java and the Lesser Sunda Islands.

== Description ==
The wingspan is about 18 mm. Palpi with the second joint reaching slightly beyond the frons. Hindwings with vein 3 from angle of cell or shortly stalked with vein 4. Male lack secondary sexual characters on the wings. Adults are uniform fuscous, with a slight rufous tinge. The forewings have a subbasal black speck on the costa and an antemedial oblique series of three specks. The hindwings have a medial waved line and traces of a submarginal waved line. Ventral side whitish with fuscous margins. Both wings with postmedial black line found angled at vein 4.
