= Marquesas tropical moist forests =

Ecoregion in the Marquesas Islands of French Polynesia

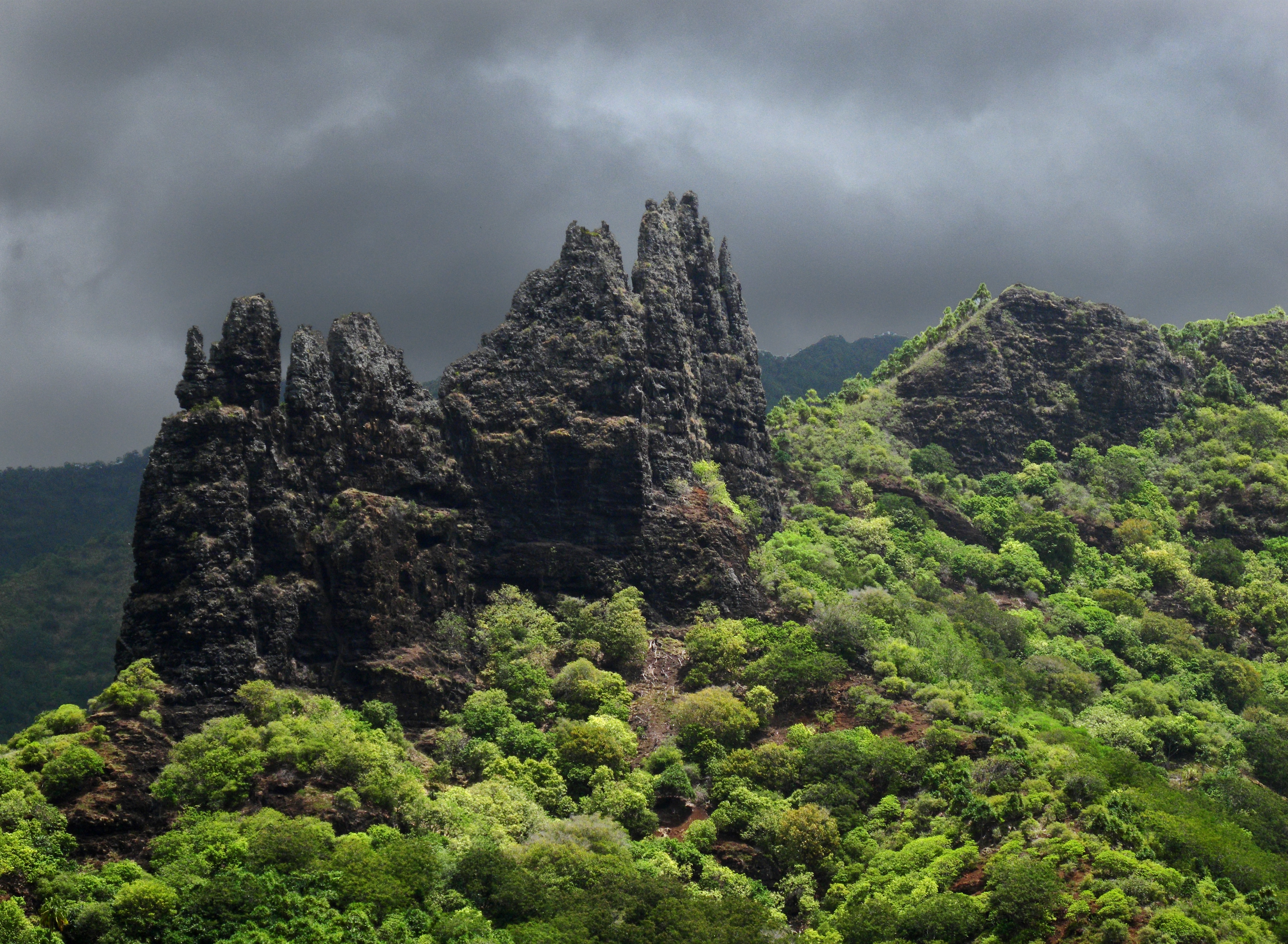
- Basalt outcrops at Hatihe'u on Nuku Hiva

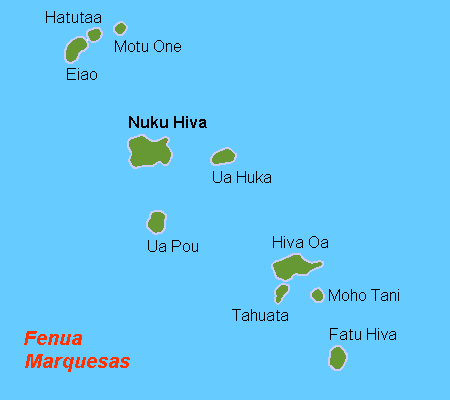
- Map of the Marquesas Islands

Ecology
- Realm: Oceanian
- Biome: tropical and subtropical moist broadleaf forests

Geography
- Area: 540 km^{2} (210 mi^{2})
- Country: French Polynesia
- Administrative subdivisions: Marquesas Islands

Conservation
- Conservation status: Critical/endangered
- Protected: 37 km^{2} (7%)

The Marquesas tropical moist forests is a tropical and subtropical moist broadleaf forests ecoregion in the Marquesas Islands of French Polynesia.

== Geography ==
The Marquesas Islands include 12 major islands of volcanic origin. They extend northwest to southeast between 8º and 11º S latitude and 139º and 141º W longitude. The islands are part of French Polynesia, lying north of the Tuamotu islands, south of Hawaii, and approximately 5,500 km (3,400 mi) west of South America.

The islands are volcanic in origin, created by the slow west-northwest movement of the Pacific Plate over the Marquesas hotspot. The northwestern islands are approximately 6 million years old, and the southeast islands are younger at 1.3 million years old.

The islands are composed of basalt rock, and have mountainous terrain with sharp ridges, deep canyons, and steep cliffs. The largest and highest islands are:

- Nuku Hiva – 339 km^{2} (131 sq mi), 1,224 m (4,016 ft)
- Hiva Oa – 316 km^{2} (122 sq mi), 1,213 m (3,980 ft)
- Ua Pou – 105.6 km^{2} (40.8 sq mi), 1,230 m (4,040 ft)
- Fatu Hiva – 85 km^{2} (33 sq mi), 1,125 m (3,691 ft)
- Ua Huka – 83.4 km^{2} (32.2 sq mi), 857 m (2,812 ft)
- Eiao – 43.8 km^{2} (16.9 sq mi), 576 m (1,890 ft)

== Climate ==
The islands have a tropical climate. Average annual rainfall varies with elevation and orientation, from 500 mm on leeward lowlands to 4000 mm or more on windward slopes above 1000 meters on the five highest islands. Trade winds blow from the southeast during most of the year, and the windward eastern slopes tend to be wetter than the leeward western slopes. The east-facing mountain slopes are cooler, with mean temperatures of 15º to 25 °C, while the hottest mean temperatures (25º to 29 °C) are in the dry western lowlands.

== Flora ==
The natural vegetation is principally tropical moist forest, which varies in height and species composition with rainfall and elevation.

Lowland forests extend up to about 300 m with areas of up to 2000 mm of annual rainfall. Typical lowland forests are dominated by Pisonia grandis, which forms a canopy up to 15 meters high, along with the trees Thespesia populnea, Calophyllum inophyllum, and Terminalia glabrata. Tropical dry forest occurred on drier leeward slopes of the larger islands, characterized by species of Hibiscus, Pandanus, Thespesia, and Cordia. Native lowland forests have mostly been replaced with introduced trees. Archeological evidence shows that some pre-settlement lowland forest trees are now extinct, including species of Planchonella and cf. Sideroxylon (Sapotaceae), and a species of Allophylus (Sapindaceae) extirpated from Nuku Hiva.

Mid-elevation forests occur between 300 and 800 meters elevation, with annual rainfall of 2,000 to 3,000 mm. Typical trees include Hibiscus tiliaceus, Pandanus tectorius, Alphitonia marquesensis, and Pterophylla marquesana, which form a canopy up to 20 meters high. Understory plants include Angiopteris evecta and Cyclophyllum barbatum. From 800 to 1000 meters elevation, Hernandia nukuhivensis, and the tree ferns Cyathea affinis and Sphaeropteris feani predominate in wet areas, and Metrosideros collina and Pterophylla marquesana on drier slopes. A cloud forest belt occurs above 1000 meters elevation, with a low-canopied forest of Cheirodendron bastardianum, Ilex anomala, and Metrosideros collina, with climbers of Freycinetia spp.

Mountaintops above 1,200 m are drier and windswept, supporting a heathland of low trees and shrubs up to one meter high, including M. collina, Vaccinium cereum, Styphelia tameiameiae, and Bidens spp., interspersed with grasses and ferns.

42% of the 320 native vascular plant species are endemic.

== Fauna ==
The ancestors of the Marquesas' native fauna arrived via long-distance dispersal from other islands, and evolved into distinct forms over millions of years.

The ecoregion has 19 breeding seabird species and 11 resident land birds, including ten endemic bird species. Endemic species include the Marquesas ground dove (Gallicolumba rubescens), Marquesas kingfisher (Halcyon godeffroyi), Fatuhiva monarch (Pomarea whitneyi), Iphis monarch (P. iphis), and Marquesas monarch (P. mendozae). Most endemic species have been decimated by introduced rats, which prey on eggs and chicks. The Nuku Hiva pigeon (Ducula galeata) is now limited to a few hundred individuals on Nuku Hiva. The ultramarine lory (Vini ultramarina) once ranged across the archipelago, but predation by introduced black rats reduced its range to Ua Huka island. The birds were reintroduced on Fatu Hiva in conjunction with a rat control program. The red-moustached fruit dove (Ptilinopus mercierii) is now extinct.

The Marquesas are home to at least 78 species of land and freshwater snails.

There are 1198 species of terrestrial arthropods in the Marquesas, 681 (53%) of which are considered endemic to the islands, 138 (11.5%) are introduced, and the remainder mostly native with some of uncertain status. The majority of the endemic insect species are contained in five orders: Coleoptera (beetles), Diptera (flies), Hemiptera (true bugs), Hymenoptera (wasps, bees and ants), and Lepidoptera (butterflies and moths). Many of the endemic species are native to a single island. Insect genera which have significant radiations of endemic species in the Marquesas include Asymphorodes (Lepidoptera, 21 spp.), Prochaetops (Diptera, 15 spp., possibly not all endemic), Campsicnemus (Diptera, 15 spp.), Pacificola (Coleoptera, 13 spp.), Dichelopa (Lepidoptera, 13 spp.), Sierola (Hymenoptera, 12 spp.), and Campylomma (Hemiptera, 11 spp.).

== Human impacts ==
Humans have altered landscape and flora and fauna of the islands since the arrival of Polynesians in the 11th and 12th centuries. Polynesian settlers introduced 33 to 37 species of plants to the islands, Including the coconut palm (Cocos nucifera), breadfruit tree (Artocarpus altilis), candlenut tree (Aleurites moluccana), Tahitian chestnut (Inocarpus fagifer), Malay apple (Syzygium malaccense), paper mulberry (Broussonetia papyrifera), and Polynesian bamboo (Schizostachyum glaucifolium), some of which have naturalized across the archipelago, as well as pigs and the Polynesian rat (Rattus exulans). Much of the native lowland forest vegetation was replaced with traditional agroforestry systems centered on the introduced breadfruit and coconut. These agroforestry landscapes provide food, fiber, and building materials while largely preventing soil erosion and nutrient depletion.

Europeans started visiting the islands in the 18th century and later conquered and settled there. Europeans brought with them many more exotic plants and animals, including black rats (Rattus rattus) which have decimated the islands' birds. Introduced sheep and goats have denuded some areas of vegetation, particularly in drier parts of the islands. Introduced grasses, shrubs, and trees are often fast-growing and adapted to grazing and fire, and can outcompete native species. By the 19th century commercial coconut plantations occupied much of the lowlands.

Relatively intact natural vegetation covers about 43% of the ecoregion's area. Most of the lowlands are used for agriculture and pasture, and very little natural lowland forest remains.

== Protected areas ==
A 2017 assessment found that 37 km^{2}, or 7%, of the ecoregion is in protected areas.
