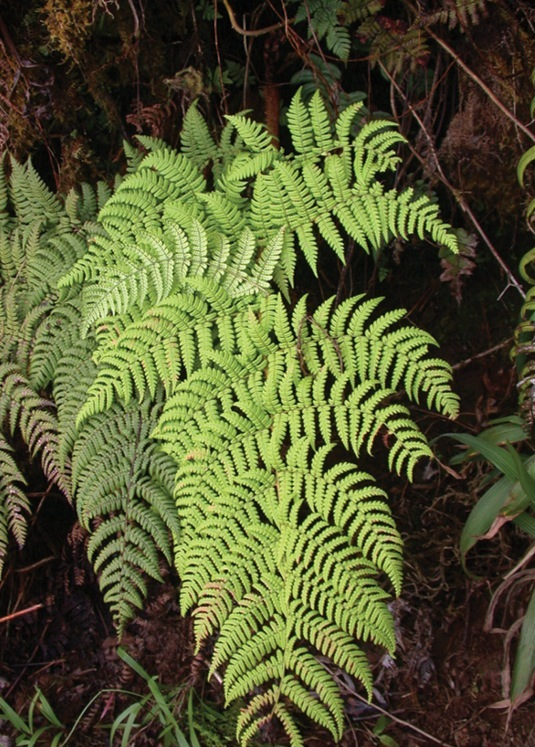

Conservation status
- Vulnerable (IUCN 3.1)

Scientific classification
- Kingdom: Plantae
- Clade: Tracheophytes
- Division: Polypodiophyta
- Class: Polypodiopsida
- Order: Polypodiales
- Suborder: Polypodiineae
- Family: Dryopteridaceae
- Genus: Dryopteris
- Species: D. macropholis

Binomial name
- Dryopteris macropholis (L.) Gray

= Dryopteris macropholis =

Species of fern

Dryopteris macropholis is a species of fern. It is distributed on the Marquesas Islands.

== Description ==
Dryopteris macropholis is a terrestrial fern; rhizomes suberect, 20–25 cm long, 5–7 cm in diameter (to 15 cm including scales), densely clothed with pale brown to reddish brown or dark brown scales; scales of rhizome and base of stipe (10–)20–80 × (1–)2–5–14 mm, thin, narrowly oblong-elliptic to linear-lanceolate, falcate, usually twisted distally, concolorous, lustrous, medium to dark brown or reddish brown, margins entire, cells narrowly rectangular to linear-fusiform.

Fronds are clustered, 5–7 per rhizome, erect-arching; stipes (35)49–75 cm long, 4–6 mm in diameter medially, about as long as the blades, adaxially grooved, reddish brown to stramineous, entire length clothed in dense, persistent, spreading, lustrous, light to dark brown or reddish brown, linear-oblong to linear-lanceolate twisted scales to c. 20 × 3 mm, margins entire or subentire and fringed with shortstipitate glands, bases darkened at point of attachment, mixed with smaller bristlelike and hairlike scales, surfaces bearing short, gland-tipped hairs, scales progressively smaller and finer distally and on rachis, stipes of older fronds punctate with dark scale bases; blades thickly chartaceous, dark above green when fresh, paler beneath, 50–100 × 32–66 cm, ovate-deltate, 3-pinnate to 3-pinnate-pinnatifid at least in lower half, distally mostly 2-pinnate-pinnatifid; rachises stramineous to light brown, densely scaly with persistent medium to dark brown, spreading bristlelike scales to 9 × 1 mm, margins entire or with sparse sessile glands, mixed with short glandular hairs, rachises of older fronds punctuate with dark brown scale bases.

The pinnae are opposite to subopposite, (11–)13–20 on a side, spreading, ovate-oblong to linear-oblong, apex acuminate, lowermost pinnae the largest, 20–33 × 11–19 cm, with 11–16 pairs of pinnules, slightly inequilateral, basiscopic basal pinnules 7–10.5 cm long, acroscopic basal pinnules shorter, 4–8.5 cm long, lowermost pinnules usually the largest, distal pinnae stalked 3–6 mm becoming sessile, apices pinnatifid; largest ultimate pinnules 12–19 × 4–8 mm, spaced 5–10 mm distant, obtuse to truncate at apices, margins crenate or cut c. 1/4 –2/3 toward costule, adaxially glabrous, abaxially glabrous except for scattered small, spreading, brown linear scales on rachises; veins forking 1–2 times, scarcely visible to visible on both surfaces, depressed adaxially and prominulous abaxially; each fertile pinnule usually with 1–4 pairs of inframedial sori. Sori with indusia 0.4–0.6 mm in diameter, brown, thick, glabrous. Spores dark brown.

== Distribution ==
The species is known from the Marquesas Islands, from Nuku Hiva, Ua Huka, Ua Pou, Hiva Oa and Tahuata.

== Ecology ==
This species is rare and localized from c. 700 to 1150 m elevation. It occurs in transitional mesic to wet forests with Alsophila tahitensis Brack., Hernandia nukuhivensis F. Br., and Sphaeropteris spp.; in wet forests dominated by Crossostylis biflora, Freycinetia spp., Hibiscus tiliaceus L., Metrosideros collina, Pandanus tectorius, and with associates including Fagraea berteroana A. Gray ex Benth., Ficus prolixa G. Forst. var. prolixa; Glochidion marchionicum F. Br., Pterophylla marquesana (F.Br.) Pillon & H.C.Hopkins var. marquesana, and Xylosma suaveolens (J. R. Forst. & G. Forst.) G. Forst. subsp. pubigerum Sleumer; in montane wet forests of Metrosideros collina and Pterophylla marquesana var. marquesana; in montane shrublands; and in and summit cloud forests and shrublands with Alsophila tahitensis, Cyrtandra spp., Dicranopteris linearis, Freycinetia spp., Metrosideros collina, Psychotria spp., Sphaeropteris spp., and Vaccinium cereum(L. f.) G. Forst. var. adenandrum (Decne.) F. Br.and diverse pteridophytes.

== Conservation status ==
Threats in most areas include human disturbance, feral pigs, and invasive weeds. The species is proposed in IUCN Red List Category Endangered (EN): B2a, B2b (i–iii): B2: total area of occupancy less than 5000 km^{2} (c. 904 km^{2}). B1a, severely fragmented; B1b (i–iii), habitat continuing decline inferred.

The suitable habitat for Dryopteris macropholis on Nuku Hiva (c. 340 km^{2}), Ua Huka (c. 83 km^{2}), Ua Pou (c. 105 km^{2}), Hiva Oa (c. 315 km^{2}), and Tahuata (c. 61 km^{2}) is restricted to mountain slopes and summits, indicated as an endangered environment that is threatened by human activity (deforestation and fire), feral animals, and invasive plants, reducing the extent of the forest.

== Systematics ==
Dryopteris macropholis seems most closely related to Dryopteris sweetorum, known only from Fatu Hiva.
