= UIA =

Uia is a locality in the Marquesas Islands.

UIA may refer to:

== Airlines ==
- Ukraine International Airlines, the flag carrier of Ukraine
- Uni Air (ICAO: UIA), a Taiwanese regional airline based in Zhongshan, Taipei
- United International Airlines, a Serbian cargo airline

== Professional organizations and unions ==
- Argentine Industrial Union (Unión Industrial Argentina)
- International Union of Architects (Union internationale des Architectes)
- Union Internationale des Avocats (International Association of Lawyers)

== Universities ==
- International Islamic University Malaysia (Universiti Islam Antarabangsa)
- Universidad Iberoamericana in Mexico
- University of Agder (Universitetet i Agder)
- University of Antwerp (Universitaire Instelling Antwerpen)

== Other uses ==
- Microsoft UI Automation, a computer accessibility technology
- Uganda Investment Authority
- UIA Mutual, a defunct insurance company in the United Kingdom
- Ukrainian Insurgent Army
- Unemployment Insurance Agency, the agency that oversees unemployment compensation in the U.S. state of Michigan
- Union of International Associations
- United Iraqi Alliance
- United Israel Appeal
- Ethel (cat), a cat known for UIA Cat meme.
