= Dichelopa castanopis =

Scientific classification
- Kingdom: Animalia
- Phylum: Arthropoda
- Class: Insecta
- Order: Lepidoptera
- Family: Tortricidae
- Genus: Dichelopa
- Species: D. castanopis

Binomial name
- Dichelopa castanopis Meyrick, 1934

Species of moth

Dichelopa castanopis is a species of moth of the family Tortricidae. It is found on the Marquesas Archipelago in French Polynesia with records only from Ua Pou. In the original species description, also specimens from Hiva Oa were included, but in 1986, J. F. Gates Clarke described the population on Hiva Oa as a distinct species, Dichelopa flexura.

The wingspan is 16–30 mm (0.63–1.18 in) for females.
