= Dichelopa deltozancla =

Scientific classification
- Kingdom: Animalia
- Phylum: Arthropoda
- Class: Insecta
- Order: Lepidoptera
- Family: Tortricidae
- Genus: Dichelopa
- Species: D. deltozancla

Binomial name
- Dichelopa deltozancla Meyrick, 1926

Species of moth

Dichelopa deltozancla is a species of moth of the family Tortricidae. It is found on Rapa Iti in the South Pacific Ocean.
