= Dichelopa zona =

Scientific classification
- Domain: Eukaryota
- Kingdom: Animalia
- Phylum: Arthropoda
- Class: Insecta
- Order: Lepidoptera
- Family: Tortricidae
- Genus: Dichelopa
- Species: D. zona

Binomial name
- Dichelopa zona Clarke, 1986

Species of moth

Dichelopa zona is a species of moth of the family Tortricidae. It is found on the Marquesas Archipelago in French Polynesia.
