= Sphaeropteris feani =

Scientific classification
- Kingdom: Plantae
- Clade: Tracheophytes
- Division: Polypodiophyta
- Class: Polypodiopsida
- Order: Cyatheales
- Family: Cyatheaceae
- Genus: Sphaeropteris
- Species: S. feani

Binomial name
- Sphaeropteris feani (E.D.Br.) R.M.Tryon (1970)

Synonyms
- Cyathea feani E.D.Br. (1931)

Species of fern

Sphaeropteris feani is a species of tree fern native to the Marquesas Islands and Solomon Islands in the South Pacific.

In the Marquesas Islands Sphaeropteris feani, together with the tree Hernandia nukuhivensis and the tree fern Cyathea affinis, is predominant in humid montane forests from 800 to 1000 meters elevation.
