= Dichelopa cirrhodoris =

Scientific classification
- Kingdom: Animalia
- Phylum: Arthropoda
- Class: Insecta
- Order: Lepidoptera
- Family: Tortricidae
- Genus: Dichelopa
- Species: D. cirrhodoris

Binomial name
- Dichelopa cirrhodoris Meyrick, 1934

Species of moth

Dichelopa cirrhodoris is a species of moth of the family Tortricidae. It is found on the Marquesas Archipelago in French Polynesia with records only from Hiva Oa.

The wingspan is 17–18 mm (0.67–0.71 in) for females.
