= Dichelopa sabulosa =

Scientific classification
- Kingdom: Animalia
- Phylum: Arthropoda
- Class: Insecta
- Order: Lepidoptera
- Family: Tortricidae
- Genus: Dichelopa
- Species: D. sabulosa

Binomial name
- Dichelopa sabulosa Meyrick, 1910

Species of moth

Dichelopa sabulosa is a species of moth of the family Tortricidae. It is found in Australia, where it has been recorded from New South Wales and Queensland.

The wingspan is 10.5 mm for males and 12 mm for females.
