= Fatu Hiva (book) =

Book by Thor Heyerdahl

Original Norwegian edition

Fatu-Hiva - Back to Nature is a book published in 1974 by archaeologist and explorer Thor Heyerdahl detailing his experiences and reflections during a 15-month stay on the Marquesan island of Fatu Hiva in 1937–38. The book was based on Heyerdahl's original report På Jakt efter Paradiset (In Search of Paradise), which was published in Norway in 1938, but because of the outbreak of World War II was never translated and rather forgotten.

== Background ==
On the occasion of their honeymoon, Thor Heyerdahl and his first wife Liv determined to escape from civilization, and to "return to nature". They nominally had an academic mission, to research the spread of animal species between islands, but in reality they intended to "run away to the South Seas" and never return home.

The couple arrived at Fatu Hiva in 1937, in the valley of Omo‘a. Finding that civilization, albeit on a vastly reduced scale, was still present there, they decided to cross over the island's mountainous interior to settle in one of the small, nearly abandoned, valleys on the eastern side of the island. There, they made their thatch-covered stilted home in the valley of Uia.

== On the origins of the Polynesians ==
It was in this setting, surrounded by the ruins of the formerly glorious Marquesan civilization, that Heyerdahl first developed his theories regarding the possibility of pre-Columbian trans-oceanic contact between the pre-European Polynesians, and the peoples and cultures of South America.

During several exchanges with an elderly Marquesan man who lived in Uia with them, a former cannibal named Tei Tetua, Heyerdahl determined that, although prior to the arrival of Europeans, cats were not to be found in Polynesia, the Marquesans were nonetheless familiar with the creatures, and indeed, certain of the carved tiki figures seemed very much to represent felines:

To our surprise, the reliefs of two human figures with hands above their heads appeared, and between them, two large quadrupeds in profile, each with an eye, a mouth, erected ears, and a tail. Two quadrupeds!...A cat?...Felines yes, but not rats. (p.173)

To the present day, Andean peasants consider the hail-cat, "ccoa" - seen with hail running out of his eyes - a beast to be reckoned with. (Sullivan, "The Secret Of The Incas", p.139)

The ccoa was an important figure in the Andean cultures. In the Mayan language, toh is the name for the puma. In Polynesia, toa is the word for "brave". Cats are not native to Polynesia, but somehow feline icons are found in their primitive sculptures and figures. In Samoa, pusi is an English derivative that was adopted with the newly arrived cat. In Fatu-Hiva, the name for cat is "poto". The fact that cats seem to display some sense of keen intellect probably caused the natives to name the new arrivals poto after the Polynesian word for smart, poto.

The observation prompted Heyerdahl to ask Tei Tetua from whence his people had come, to which he replied "the east":

"From where?" I asked, and was curious to hear the old man's reply. "From Te Fiti [The East]", answered the old man and nodded toward that part of the horizon where the sun rose, the direction in which there was no other land except South America. (p.217)

Heyerdahl went on to explore this possibility a number of years later, as is detailed in his books Kon-Tiki and Aku-Aku: The Secret of Easter Island.

== Disillusion ==
Initially, the Heyerdahls found life on Fatu Hiva to be idyllic, what with the abundance of fruit trees and readily available unpolluted river water. The charm soon wore off, however, as they had to face the reality of elephantiasis-bearing mosquitos, as well as other unfamiliar tropical diseases. Eventually, also, Thor and Liv found it impossible to live among the local people and ended up sheltering in a cave, anxious to get home.

The book begins with Heyerdahl's optimistic idea that paradise could still be found. By the end of the book, Heyerdahl bitterly concludes:

There is nothing for modern man to return to. Our wonderful time in the wilderness had given us a taste of what man had abandoned and what mankind was still trying to get even further away from. ... Progress today can be defined as man's ability to complicate simplicity. ... Nothing in all the procedure that modern man, helped by all his modern middlemen, goes through before he earns money to buy a fish or a potato will ever be as simple as pulling it out of the water or soil. Without the farmer and the fisherman, modern society would collapse, with all its shops and pipes and wires. The farmers and the fishermen represent the nobility of modern society; they share their crumbs with the rest of us, who run about with papers and screwdrivers attempting to build a better world without a blueprint.

== Chapters ==
1. Farewell to Civilization
2. Back to Nature
3. White Men, Dark Shadows
4. Exodus
5. Taboo
6. Ocean Escape
7. On Hivaoa
8. Island of Ill Omen
9. In the Cannibal Valley
10. Cave Dwellers

== Publishing history ==
- Thor Heyerdahl: Fatu-Hiva - Back to Nature
  - First published in Great Britain by George Allen & Unwin, 1974
  - Doubleday & Company, Inc., Garden City, NY, 1975
  - Penguin edition, 1976, (ISBN 0-14-004188-5), jointly by
    - Penguin Books Ltd, Harmondsworth, Middlesex, England
    - Penguin Books, 625 Madison Avenue, New York, New York 10022, U.S.A.
    - Penguin Books Australia Ltd, Ringwood, Victoria Australia
    - Penguin Books Canada Ltd, 41 Steelcase Road West, Markham, Ontario, Canada
    - Penguin Books (N.Z.) Ltd, 182-190 Wairau Road, Auckland 10, New Zealand
- Thor Heyerdahl: Fatu Hiva: Back to Nature
  - Buccaneer Books, 1992, (ISBN 0-89966-928-X)
