= Hana Vave =

Bay in Fatu Hiva, French Polynesia

Coordinates: 10°27′47″S 138°39′47″W

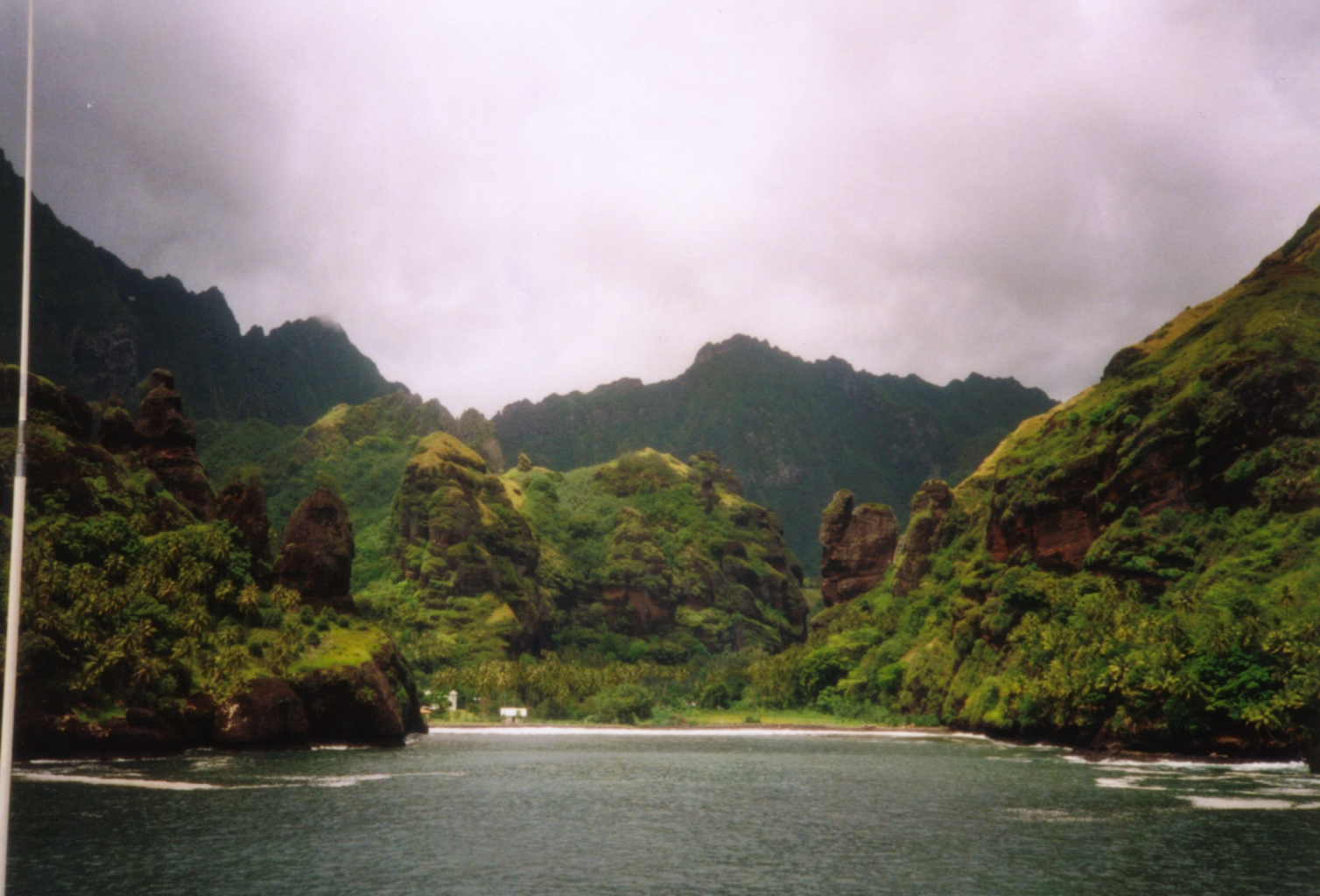
View of Hana Vave from outside the entrance to the bay. Note basalt spire on either side of the bay.

Map

Hana Vave is the name of the northernmost bay on the west coast of Fatu Hiva in French Polynesia. The bay is sometimes called the Bay of Virgins, a translation of the French name Baie des Vierges.

The French name originally given to the bay was Baie des Verges (Bay of Penes), because of the phallus-shaped basalt spires that rise on either side of its entrance.

Hana Vave is also the name of a small village located at the head of the bay, which in 2020 had an estimated population of 346. In 2002, it had approximately 200 inhabitants.
