= Dichelopa orthiostyla =

Scientific classification
- Kingdom: Animalia
- Phylum: Arthropoda
- Class: Insecta
- Order: Lepidoptera
- Family: Tortricidae
- Genus: Dichelopa
- Species: D. orthiostyla

Binomial name
- Dichelopa orthiostyla Meyrick, 1934

Species of moth

Dichelopa orthiostyla is a species of moth of the family Tortricidae. It is found on the Marquesas Archipelago in French Polynesia with records only from Hiva Oa.

The wingspan is 16–19 mm (0.63–0.75 in) for females. The type series was collected with light from north slope of Mount Temetiu at 1,180 m (3,860 ft) above sea level.
