= Dichelopa tarsodes =

Scientific classification
- Kingdom: Animalia
- Phylum: Arthropoda
- Class: Insecta
- Order: Lepidoptera
- Family: Tortricidae
- Genus: Dichelopa
- Species: D. tarsodes

Binomial name
- Dichelopa tarsodes Meyrick, 1910

Species of moth

Dichelopa tarsodes is a species of moth of the family Tortricidae. It is found in Australia, where it has been recorded from New South Wales, specifically around Mt Gladstone, Cooma.

The wingspan is about 12 mm.
