= Dichelopa porphyrophanes =

Scientific classification
- Domain: Eukaryota
- Kingdom: Animalia
- Phylum: Arthropoda
- Class: Insecta
- Order: Lepidoptera
- Family: Tortricidae
- Genus: Dichelopa
- Species: D. porphyrophanes

Binomial name
- Dichelopa porphyrophanes Meyrick, 1934

Species of moth

Dichelopa porphyrophanes is a species of moth of the family Tortricidae. It is found on the Marquesas Archipelago in French Polynesia with records from Ua Pou (type locality: Hakahau Valley at 590 m (1,950 ft) above sea level) and Hiva Oa, although the latter could represent a different species.

The wingspan is 17 mm (0.67 in) for females.
