= Dichelopa sciota =

Scientific classification
- Domain: Eukaryota
- Kingdom: Animalia
- Phylum: Arthropoda
- Class: Insecta
- Order: Lepidoptera
- Family: Tortricidae
- Genus: Dichelopa
- Species: D. sciota

Binomial name
- Dichelopa sciota (Lower, 1916)

Synonyms
- Tortrix sciota Lower, 1916

Species of moth

Dichelopa sciota is a species of moth of the family Tortricidae. It is found in Australia, where it has been recorded from South Australia.

The wingspan is about 18 mm. The forewings are light fuscous, reticulated throughout with waved transverse dot-like lines of darker fuscous. The costa between the base and median band is dull bronze-fuscous. There is a moderately broad fuscous median band, reaching from the middle of the costa to the tornus. The hindwings are fuscous with darker spots.
