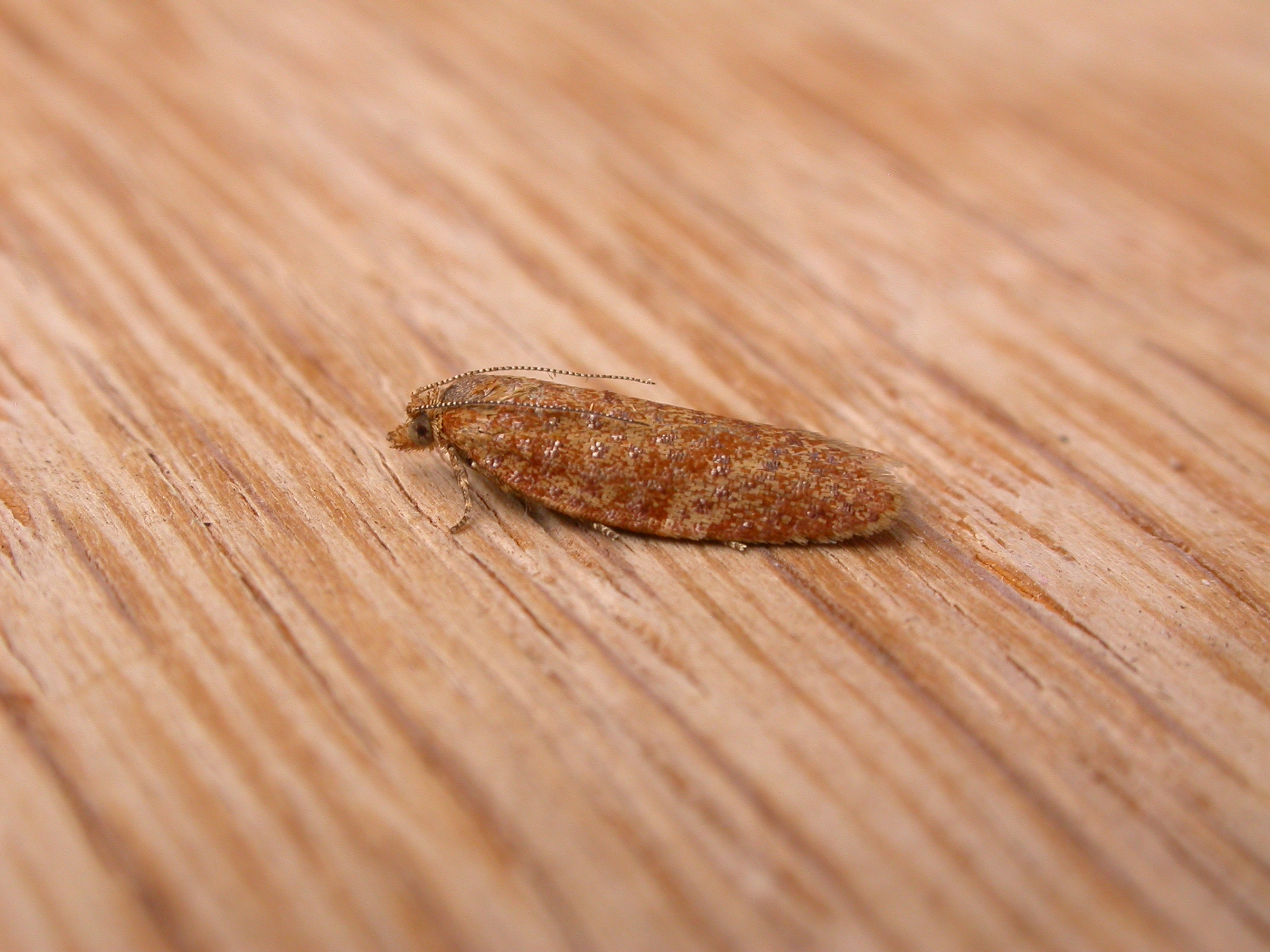

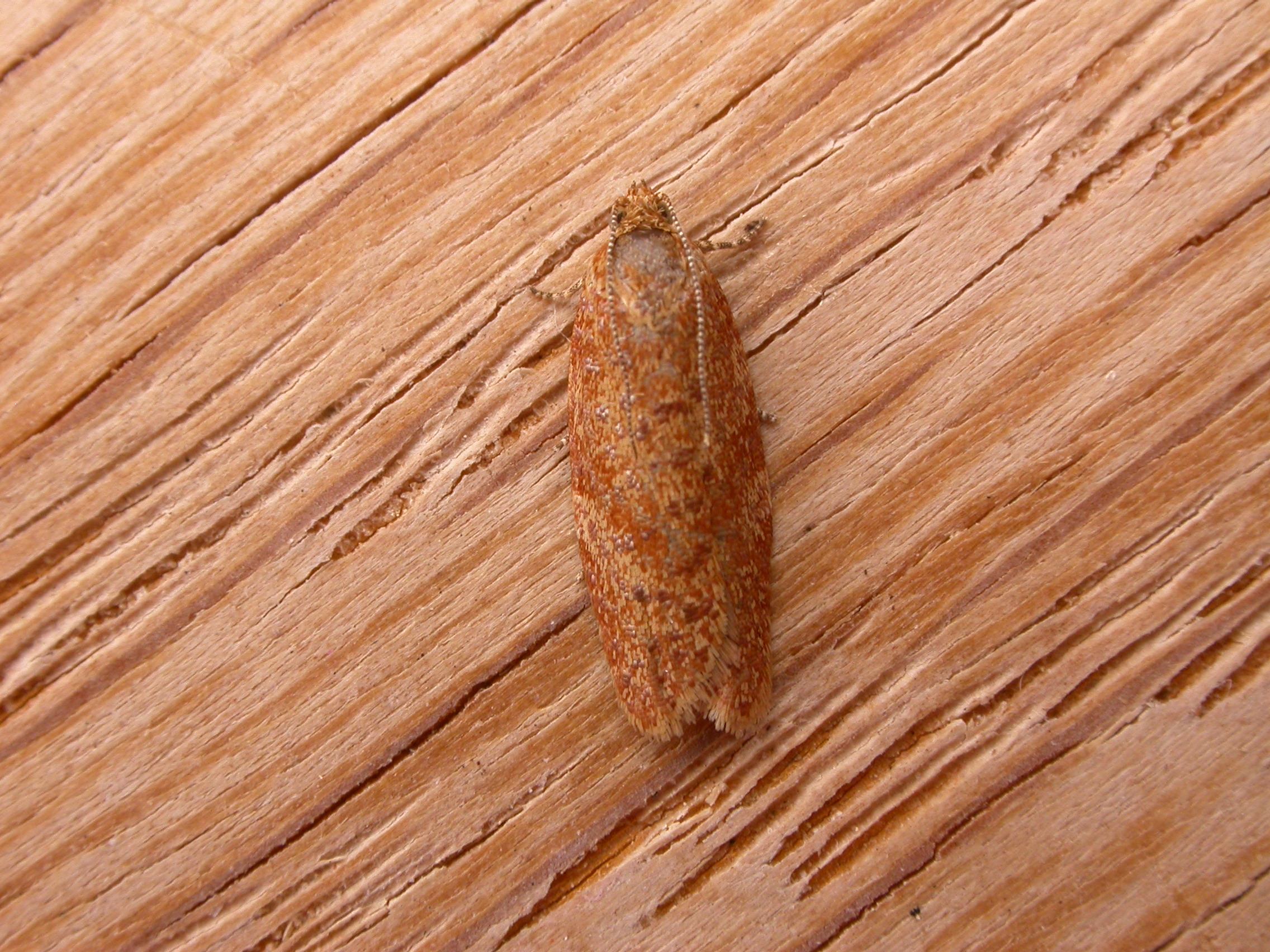

Scientific classification
- Kingdom: Animalia
- Phylum: Arthropoda
- Class: Insecta
- Order: Lepidoptera
- Family: Tortricidae
- Genus: Dichelopa
- Species: D. panoplana

Binomial name
- Dichelopa panoplana (Meyrick, 1881)

Synonyms
- Dichelia panoplana Meyrick, 1881; Dichelopa heterozyga Turner, 1916; Lamyrodes molybdospora Turner, 1926

= Dichelopa panoplana =

Species of moth

Dichelopa panoplana is a moth of the family Tortricidae. It is known from Australia, where it widespread in semiarid areas from southern Queensland to South Australia.

The wingspan is about 12 mm. The forewings are reddish-brown, mixed with fuscous and crossed by numerous broken silvery transverse lines. The hindwings are dark-brown.

The larvae feed on Dodonaea species.
