= Hernandia nukuhivensis =

Conservation status
- Vulnerable (IUCN 3.1)

Scientific classification
- Kingdom: Plantae
- Clade: Embryophytes
- Clade: Tracheophytes
- Clade: Spermatophytes
- Clade: Angiosperms
- Clade: Magnoliids
- Order: Laurales
- Family: Hernandiaceae
- Genus: Hernandia
- Species: H. nukuhivensis

Binomial name
- Hernandia nukuhivensis F.Br. (1935)

Species of flowering plant

Hernandia nukuhivensis is a species of flowering plant in the Hernandiaceae family. It is a tree endemic to the Marquesas Islands of French Polynesia.

It is the predominant tree in wet montane forest from 800 to 1000 meters elevation, together with the tree ferns Cyathea affinis and Sphaeropteris feani.
