= Omo'a =

- Town
- Location in the Marquesas Islands
- Coordinates: 10°30′44″S 138°40′58″W
- Country: France
- Overseas collectivity: French Polynesia
- Territory: Marquesas Islands
- Island: Fatu Hiva

Population (2002)
  - Total: 400

Omo‘a (or Omoa) is the name of a small town and valley at the head of a bay by the same name, on Fatu Hiva.

The bay of Omo‘a is the southernmost bay on the western coast of Fatu Hiva, and provides a good anchorage. In 2002, it had approximately 400 inhabitants. The village is home to the island's only Protestant church. The valley of Omo‘a is well-watered, and curves in a half-moon shape, first to the southeast, and then to the northeast, terminating at the island's central plateau. This is where Thor Heyerdahl and his wife came ashore in 1937, an experience recorded in his book Fatu Hiva.
