= Dichelopa chionogramma =

Scientific classification
- Kingdom: Animalia
- Phylum: Arthropoda
- Class: Insecta
- Order: Lepidoptera
- Family: Tortricidae
- Genus: Dichelopa
- Species: D. chionogramma

Binomial name
- Dichelopa chionogramma Clarke, 1986

Species of moth

Dichelopa chionogramma is a species of moth of the family Tortricidae. It is found on the Marquesas Archipelago in French Polynesia. It was first described by Edward Meyrick in 1934.

Like several other species in its genus, Dichelopa chionogramma is endemic to the Marquesas Archipelago, with closely related taxa recorded only on islands such as Hiva Oa and Nuku Hiva.
