= Dichelopa sericopis =

Scientific classification
- Kingdom: Animalia
- Phylum: Arthropoda
- Class: Insecta
- Order: Lepidoptera
- Family: Tortricidae
- Genus: Dichelopa
- Species: D. sericopis

Binomial name
- Dichelopa sericopis Meyrick, 1926

Species of moth

Dichelopa sericopis is a species of moth of the family Tortricidae. It is found on Rapa Iti in the South Pacific Ocean.
