= Pterophylla tremuloides =

Conservation status
- Endangered (IUCN 3.1)

Scientific classification
- Kingdom: Plantae
- Clade: Embryophytes
- Clade: Tracheophytes
- Clade: Angiosperms
- Clade: Eudicots
- Clade: Rosids
- Order: Oxalidales
- Family: Cunoniaceae
- Genus: Pterophylla
- Species: P. tremuloides

Binomial name
- Pterophylla tremuloides (H.C.Hopkins & J.Florence) Pillon & H.C.Hopkins

Synonyms
- Weinmannia tremuloides H.C.Hopkins & J.Florence

Species of flowering plant

Pterophylla tremuloides, formerly known as Weinmannia tremuloides, is a species of plant in the family Cunoniaceae. It is a shrub endemic to the island of Fatu Hiva in the Marquesas Islands of French Polynesia.

== Description ==
Pterophylla tremuloides is a shrub which grows up to 2 meters high. Its leaves are trifoliolate and glabrous, with a total length up to 9 cm including a petiole of 2.5–4.2 cm. The inflorescence is a trio of flower spikes up to 6 cm long, covered in tiny white flowers. The species name tremuloides means trembling, an appearance given by the long, laterally compressed petioles.

== Range and habitat ==
Pterophylla tremuloides is found only on the island of Fatu Hiva. Its typical habitat is low ridge top and cliff shrubland with Metrosideros, Dicranopteris, and Lycopodium between 700 and 850 metres elevation, where it is locally common.
