= Melicope fatuhivensis =

Conservation status
- Critically Endangered (IUCN 3.1)

Scientific classification
- Kingdom: Plantae
- Clade: Tracheophytes
- Clade: Angiosperms
- Clade: Eudicots
- Clade: Rosids
- Order: Sapindales
- Family: Rutaceae
- Genus: Melicope
- Species: M. fatuhivensis

Binomial name
- Melicope fatuhivensis (F.Br.) T.G.Hartley & B.C.Stone

Synonyms
- Pelea fatuhivensis F.Br.

Species of flowering plant

Melicope fatuhivensis is a species of flowering plant in the family Rutaceae. It is endemic to the island of Fatu Hiva in the Marquesas Islands of French Polynesia.
