= Dichelopa dichroa =

Scientific classification
- Domain: Eukaryota
- Kingdom: Animalia
- Phylum: Arthropoda
- Class: Insecta
- Order: Lepidoptera
- Family: Tortricidae
- Genus: Dichelopa
- Species: D. dichroa

Binomial name
- Dichelopa dichroa Lower, 1901

Synonyms
- Lamyrodes stenozona Turner, 1926

Species of moth

Dichelopa dichroa is a species of moth of the family Tortricidae. It is found in Australia, where it has been recorded from South Australia, Victoria and New South Wales.

The wingspan is about 14.5 mm. The forewings are pale ochreous with a few grey and fuscous scales. The markings are fuscous-brown mixed with grey. The hindwings are fuscous.
