= Culture of the Marquesas Islands =

Culture of an archipelago in French Polynesia

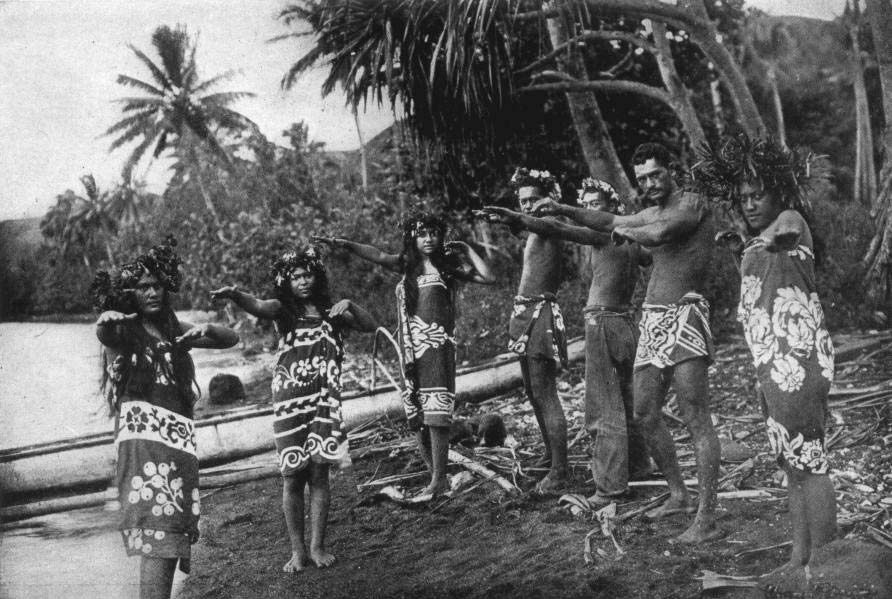
Marquesans performing a Haka dance

The Marquesas Islands were colonized by seafaring Polynesians as early as 300 AD, thought to originate from Tonga and the Samoan Islands. The dense population was concentrated in the narrow valleys and consisted of warring tribes.

Much of Polynesia, including the original settlers of Hawaii, Tahiti, Rapa Iti and Easter Island, was settled by Marquesans, believed to have departed from the Marquesas as a result more frequently of overpopulation and drought-related food shortages, than because of the nearly constant warfare that eventually became a prominent feature of the islands' culture. Almost the entire remainder of Polynesia, with the exception of a few areas of western Polynesia as well as the majority of the Polynesian outliers, was colonized by Marquesan descendants centered in Tahiti.

== Culture ==
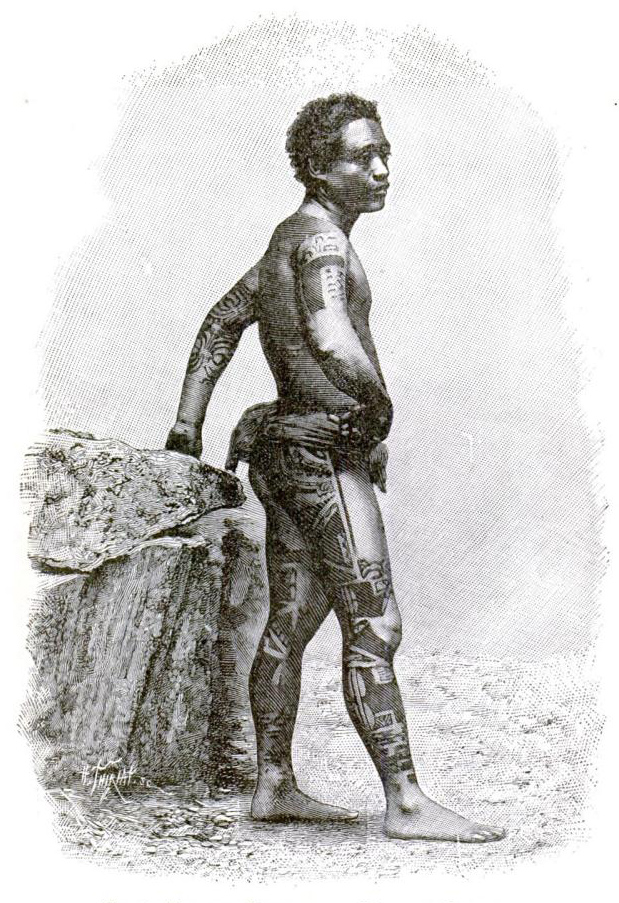
An 1890 etching showing a Marquesan man in his tattoos

=== 1595–1945 ===
Native Marquesan culture was devastated in the period following the arrival of European explorers. The primary cause of its collapse can be directly linked to the catastrophic effects of alien diseases, especially smallpox, which reduced the population by an estimated 98%.

The sexual culture of Marquesans is often misrepresented. Robert Louis Stevenson, who visited the islands and talked to the natives, wrote:

"Stanislao Moanatini told me that in his own recollection, the young were strictly guarded; they were not suffered so much as to look upon one another in the street, but passed (so my informant put it) like dogs; and the other day the whole school-children of Nuka-hiva and Ua-pu escaped in a body to the woods, and lived there for a fortnight in promiscuous liberty. Readers of travels may perhaps exclaim at my authority, and declare themselves better informed. I should prefer the statement of an intelligent native like Stanislao (even if it stood alone, which it is far from doing) to the report of the most honest traveller."

(The conflicting reports mentioned here are compactly summarized by Robert Carl Suggs.)

=== Tatu ===
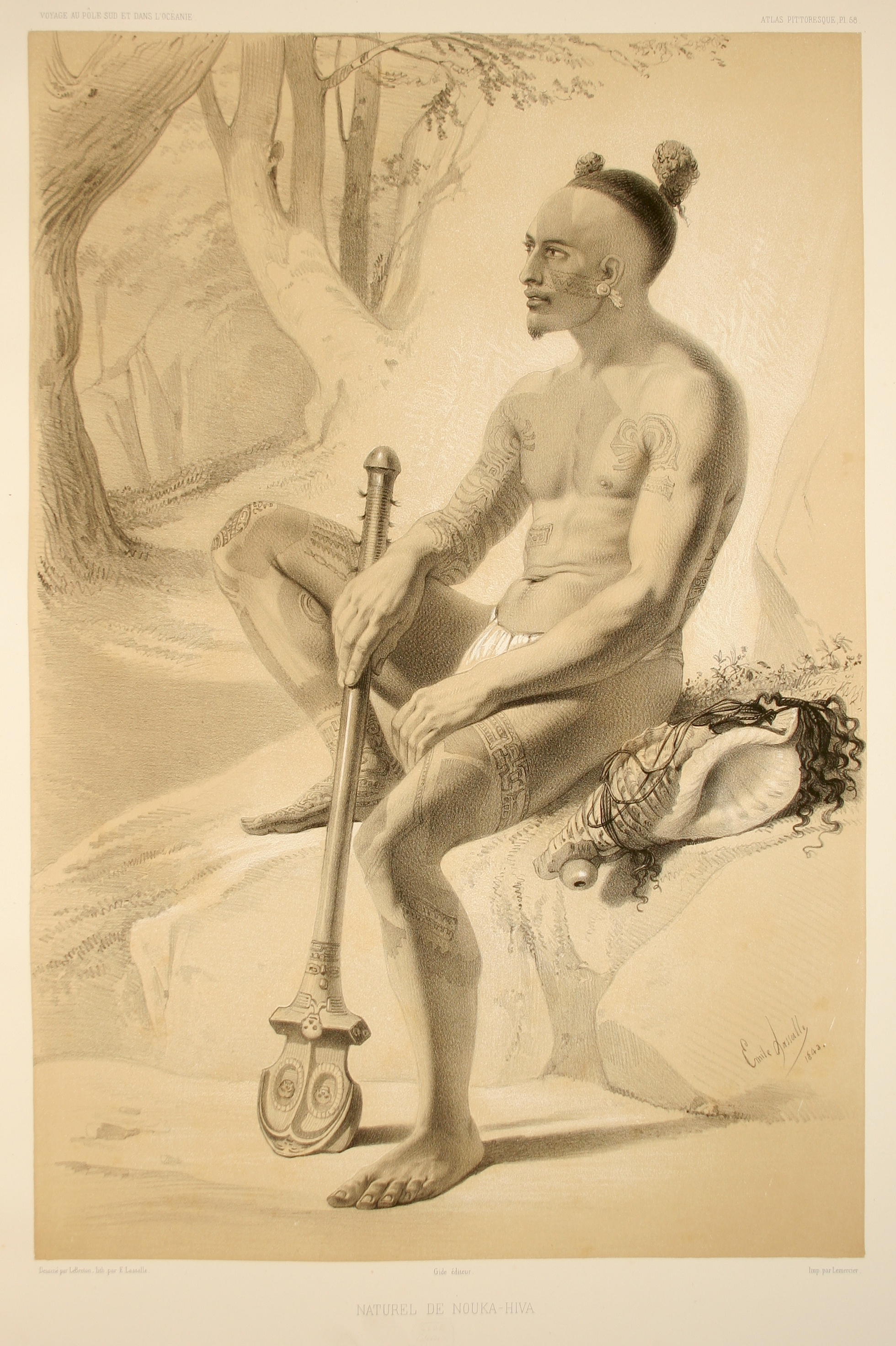
Drawing of a man from the Marquesas Islands, 1846

The Marquesas have a long history of complex geometric tattooing, covering the whole bodies of both men and women.

Marquesan tattoos can be recognized by 'trademark symbols', such as geckos, centipedes, Ti'i's, the Marquesan Cross (which is also commonly confused with other designs) and other geometric designs. Marquesan designs distinguish themselves through the use of symbols and consistent artistic renderings of lines, arches and circles, which are uniquely attributed and linked through history to the South Pacific Islands.

Boys received their first tattoos in their teens in a ritual setting, and by old age often had tattoos all over their bodies. Women were also tattooed, but not as extensively as men. The designs share many symbolic motifs, but were never copied entirely; every individual's tattoos were different and signified heritage, accomplishments, the specific Marquesan island the individual came from and their familial position.

=== Contemporary period ===
Today, Marquesan culture is a mélange created by the layering of the ancient Marquesan culture, with strong influences from the important Tahitian culture and the politically important French culture.

Ua Huka is host to the biennial Marquesas Islands Arts Festival. The Marquesas Islands Arts Festival was created in 1986 by the Motu-Haka cultural federation with the aim of promoting Marquesan culture.

== In Western culture ==
- Famous French painter Paul Gauguin and Belgian singer Jacques Brel spent the last years of their lives in the Marquesas, and are buried there. Brel composed a famous song, Les Marquises, about the Marquesas Islands, his last home.
- The Marquesas provided inspiration to American novelist Herman Melville, whose experiences in the Marquesas formed the basis for his novel Typee.
- Robert Louis Stevenson visited the Marquesas in 1888, and wrote about his experiences and impressions there in 1900, in a book called In the South Seas.
- Thor Heyerdahl wrote his book Fatu Hiva during a year-long stay on that island.
- The island group is also mentioned in passing in the Crosby, Stills & Nash song, "Southern Cross".
- The Marquesas Islands temporarily received an international spotlight in the United States when the reality TV show Survivor: Marquesas was filmed there. It was the fourth installment of the American TV series Survivor.

== See also ==
- Marquesan language
- Wood carving in the Marquesas Islands
