= Dichelopa argosphena =

Scientific classification
- Kingdom: Animalia
- Phylum: Arthropoda
- Clade: Pancrustacea
- Class: Insecta
- Order: Lepidoptera
- Family: Tortricidae
- Genus: Dichelopa
- Species: D. argosphena

Binomial name
- Dichelopa argosphena Meyrick, 1934

Species of moth

Dichelopa argosphena is a species of moth of the family Tortricidae from the Marquesas Archipelago in French Polynesia. It is only known from Hiva Oa.

The wingspan is 14 mm (0.55 in) for the holotype, a male, and 15–16 mm (0.59–0.63 in) for females.
