= Dichelopa pyrsogramma =

Scientific classification
- Domain: Eukaryota
- Kingdom: Animalia
- Phylum: Arthropoda
- Class: Insecta
- Order: Lepidoptera
- Family: Tortricidae
- Genus: Dichelopa
- Species: D. pyrsogramma

Binomial name
- Dichelopa pyrsogramma Meyrick, 1934

Species of moth

Dichelopa pyrsogramma is a species of moth of the family Tortricidae. It is found on the Marquesas Archipelago in French Polynesia with records only from Nuku Hiva.

The wingspan is 8 mm (0.31 in) for the holotype, a female. It was collected on a Cyrtandra species on the summit of Mount Ooumu at 1,190 m (3,890 ft) above sea level. Later collections have made on elevations above 769 m (2,523 ft).
