= Dichelopa lupicinia =

Scientific classification
- Domain: Eukaryota
- Kingdom: Animalia
- Phylum: Arthropoda
- Class: Insecta
- Order: Lepidoptera
- Family: Tortricidae
- Genus: Dichelopa
- Species: D. lupicinia

Binomial name
- Dichelopa lupicinia Clarke, 1971

Species of moth

Dichelopa lupicinia is a species of moth of the family Tortricidae. It is found on Rapa Iti in the South Pacific Ocean.
