= Dichelopa loricata =

Scientific classification
- Kingdom: Animalia
- Phylum: Arthropoda
- Class: Insecta
- Order: Lepidoptera
- Family: Tortricidae
- Genus: Dichelopa
- Species: D. loricata

Binomial name
- Dichelopa loricata Meyrick, 1910

Species of moth

Dichelopa loricata is a species of moth of the family Tortricidae. It is found in Australia, where it has been recorded from New South Wales and Queensland.

The wingspan is about 10.5 mm.
