= Dichelopa anthracodelta =

Scientific classification
- Domain: Eukaryota
- Kingdom: Animalia
- Phylum: Arthropoda
- Class: Insecta
- Order: Lepidoptera
- Family: Tortricidae
- Genus: Dichelopa
- Species: D. anthracodelta

Binomial name
- Dichelopa anthracodelta Clarke, 1971

Synonyms
- Dichelopa anthrocodelta Brown & Lewis, 2000

Species of moth

Dichelopa anthracodelta is a species of moth of the family Tortricidae. It is found on Rapa Iti in the South Pacific Ocean.
