= Uia =

- Coordinates: 10.486°S 138.624°W
- Country: Marquesas Islands

Uia is the name of a town on the central eastern coast of the Marquesas island Fatu Hiva.

The well-watered valley, the largest on the east coast of the island, is about 1.3 km wide at its mouth, with steep ridges on all sides. In 1937 and 1938, the Norwegian archaeologist and explorer Thor Heyerdahl and his first wife Liv spent their honeymoon (a year and a half) primarily in this valley. The book, Fatu Hiva, describes their adventures.
