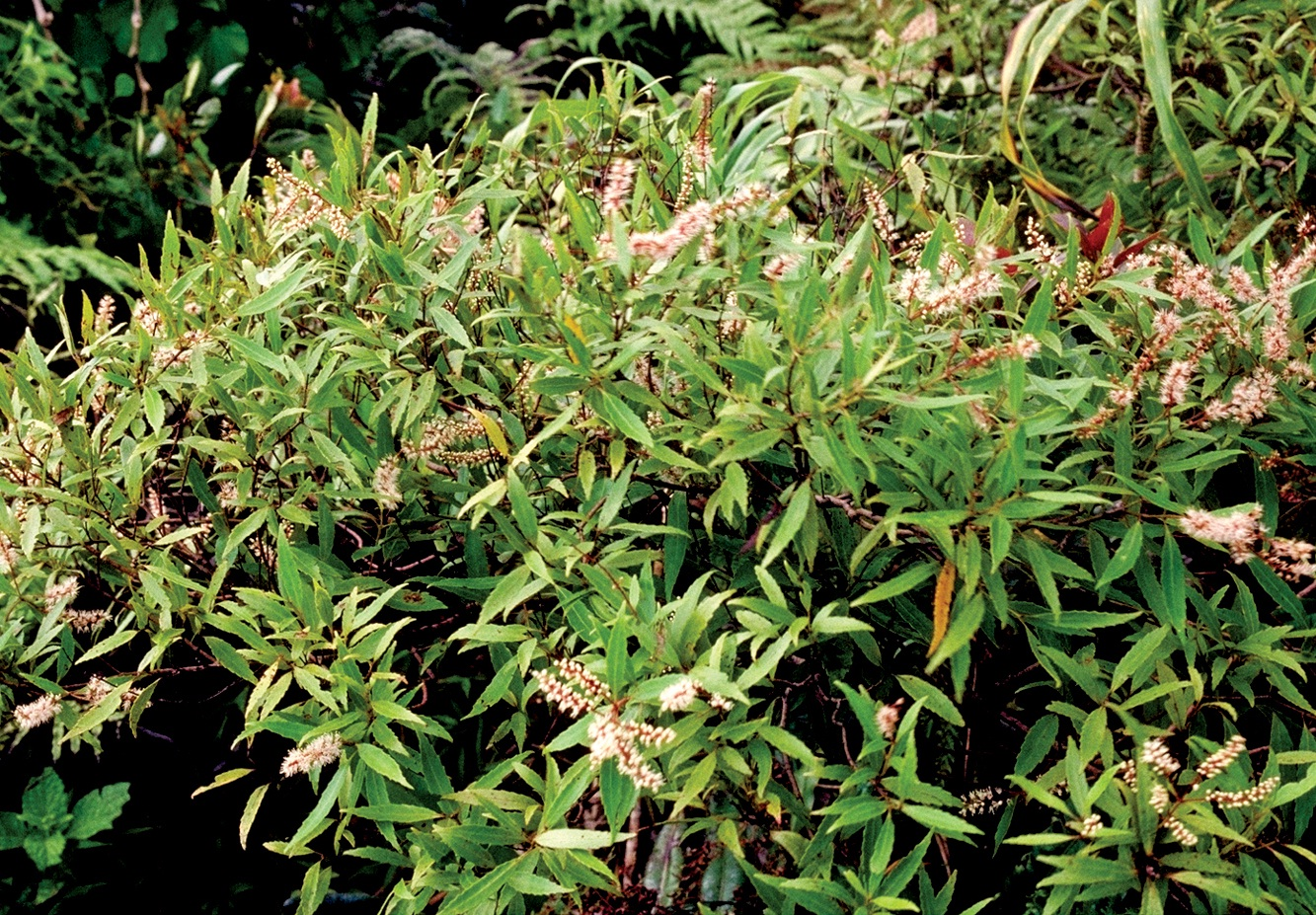
- Pterophylla marquesana var. angustifolia

Conservation status
- Near Threatened (IUCN 3.1)

Scientific classification
- Kingdom: Plantae
- Clade: Embryophytes
- Clade: Tracheophytes
- Clade: Angiosperms
- Clade: Eudicots
- Clade: Rosids
- Order: Oxalidales
- Family: Cunoniaceae
- Genus: Pterophylla
- Species: P. marquesana

Binomial name
- Pterophylla marquesana (F.Br.) Pillon & H.C.Hopkins

Synonyms
- Weinmannia marquesana F.Br.; Weinmannia parviflora var. marquesana (F.Br.) Fosberg

= Pterophylla marquesana =

Species of flowering plant

Pterophylla marquesana, formerly known as Weinmannia marquesana, is a species of flowering plant in the family Cunoniaceae. It is a shrub or tree endemic to the Marquesas Islands of French Polynesia.

== Description ==
Pterophylla marquesana is a shrub to a small tree, rarely a subshrub, (0.6-) 1.5 – 10 meters tall, with a trunk up to 35 cm in diameter. Its growth habit varies with elevation and exposure. Its crown is sometimes umbrella-shaped when it grows as a small tree. Leaves are elliptical or sometimes ovate, (2.5–) 3.3–7.5 (–9.6) cm long by (1–) 1.3–3.6 (–4.4) cm wide. Flowers are greenish-white to cream, with a greenish-red calyx and white corolla and stamens. Young fruits are green to bright carmine red. Its bark is smooth and grey, brown, or reddish in color. Its sapwood is white or pinkish, and its heartwood is red and fragrant.

== Range and habitat ==
Pterophylla marquesana grows on the islands of Fatu Hiva, Hiva Oa, Nuku Hiva, Tahuata, Ua Huka, and Ua Pou. It grows at mid- to high-elevations, typically above 500 to 600 meters elevation except on Nuku Hiva, where found from 790–1180 m.

It is common in mid-elevation forests, which occur between 300 and 800 meters elevation on the larger islands. It is a canopy tree, which together with Hibiscus tiliaceus, Pandanus tectorius, and Alphitonia marquesensis, forms the 20-meter high forest canopy. On Nuku Hiva it is the co-dominant canopy tree in montane forests above 790 meters elevation.

It also occurs in dry scrub on rocky ridges and hilltops with the fern Dicranopteris, and in savannas and dry forest with Dicranopteris and Metrosideros trees.

== Varieties ==
There are three accepted varieties:

- Pterophylla marquesana var. angustifolia (Lorence & W.L.Wagner) Pillon & H.C.Hopkins – endemic to Tahuata.
- Pterophylla marquesana var. marquesana – the most widespread variety, it is found on Fatu Hiva, Hiva Oa, Nuku Hiva, Tahuata, Ua Huka, and Ua Pou.
- Pterophylla marquesana var. myrsinites (Fosberg & Sachet) Pillon & H.C.Hopkins – found only on Hiva Oa, where it generally grows as a shrub 0.6 to 1.5 m high, and less often as a small tree up to 2 m high. Its flowers are white, its young fruits are red, and its inflorescences are much shorter than those of var. marquesana. It is common in summit scrub (maquis sommital) on high, windswept slopes and ridges on the dry side of island, and in cloud forest on the windward side of the island, from 800 to 1300 metres elevation.
