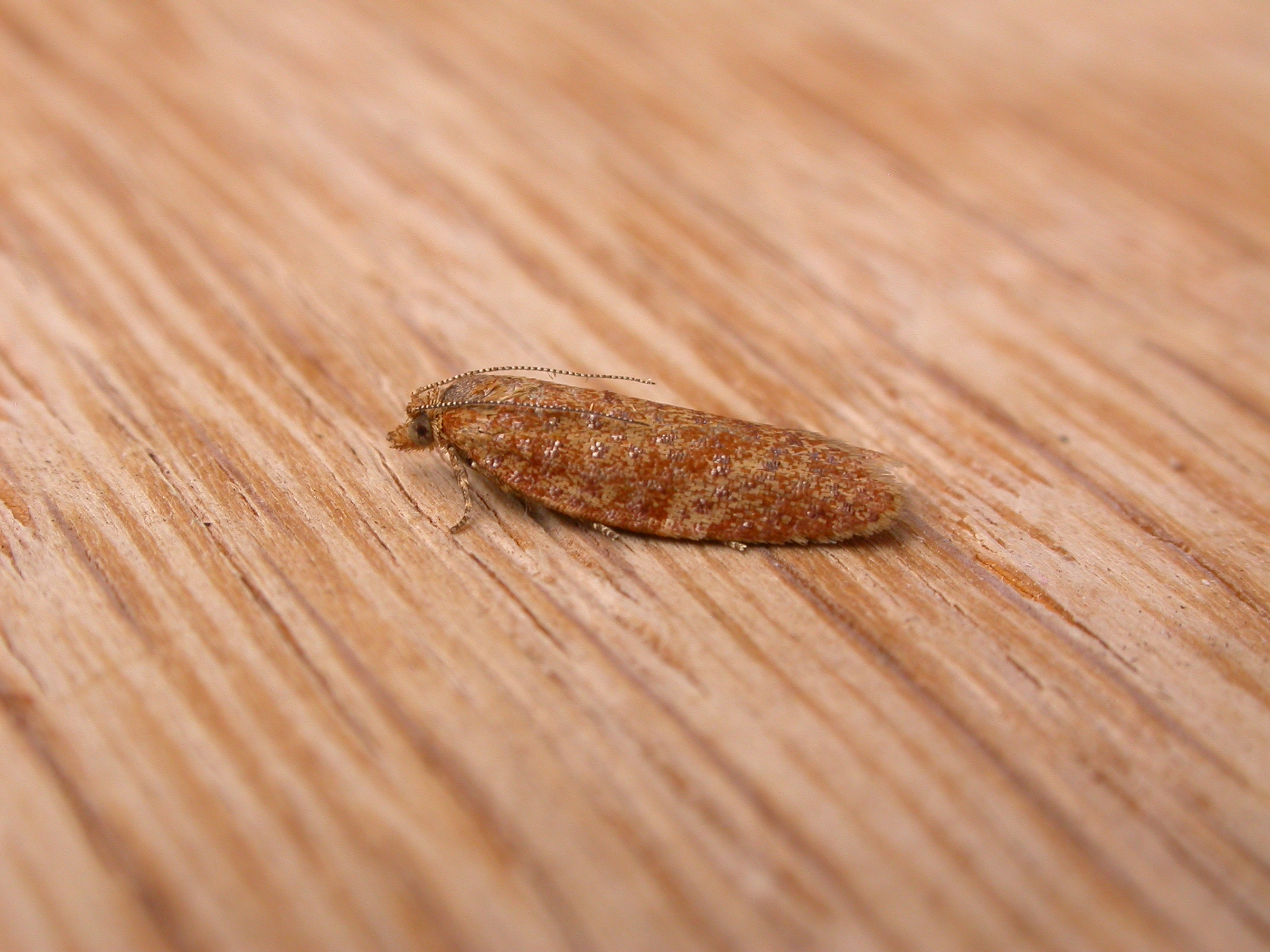

Scientific classification
- Domain: Eukaryota
- Kingdom: Animalia
- Phylum: Arthropoda
- Class: Insecta
- Order: Lepidoptera
- Family: Tortricidae
- Tribe: Archipini
- Genus: Dichelopa; Lower, 1901

= Dichelopa =

Genus of tortrix moths

Dichelopa is a genus of moths belonging to the subfamily Tortricinae of the family Tortricidae.

== Species ==
- Dichelopa achranta Meyrick, 1910
- Dichelopa amorpha Clarke, 1986
- Dichelopa anthracodelta Clarke, 1971
- Dichelopa argema Clarke, 1986
- Dichelopa argoschista Meyrick, 1928
- Dichelopa argosphena Meyrick, 1934
- Dichelopa argyrospiloides Clarke, 1971
- Dichelopa canitia Clarke, 1986
- Dichelopa castanopis Meyrick, 1934
- Dichelopa ceramocausta Meyrick, 1926
- Dichelopa chionogramma Clarke, 1986
- Dichelopa choleranthes Meyrick, 1928
- Dichelopa cirrhodoris Meyrick, 1934
- Dichelopa deltozancla Meyrick, 1926
- Dichelopa dendrophila Clarke, 1971
- Dichelopa dichroa Lower, 1901
- Dichelopa dorsata Clarke, 1986
- Dichelopa dryomorpha Meyrick, 1928
- Dichelopa exulcerata Meyrick, 1926
- Dichelopa flexura Clarke, 1986
- Dichelopa fulvistrigata Meyrick, 1928
- Dichelopa gnoma Clarke, 1986
- Dichelopa hadrotes Clarke, 1986
- Dichelopa harmodes Meyrick, 1928
- Dichelopa honoranda Meyrick, 1926
- Dichelopa iochorda Meyrick, 1926
- Dichelopa loricata Meyrick, 1910
- Dichelopa lupicinia Clarke, 1971
- Dichelopa meligma Clarke, 1986
- Dichelopa messalina Clarke, 1971
- Dichelopa myopori Clarke, 1971
- Dichelopa ochroma Clarke, 1986
- Dichelopa orthiostyla Meyrick, 1934
- Dichelopa pachydmeta Meyrick, 1928
- Dichelopa panoplana Meyrick, 1881
- Dichelopa paragnoma Clarke, 1986
- Dichelopa peropaca Meyrick, 1928
- Dichelopa phalaranthes Meyrick, 1934
- Dichelopa platyxantha Clarke, 1986
- Dichelopa porphyrophanes Meyrick, 1934
- Dichelopa praestrigata Meyrick, 1928
- Dichelopa pulcheria Clarke, 1971
- Dichelopa pyrsogramma Meyrick, 1934
- Dichelopa rhodographa Clarke, 1971
- Dichelopa sabulosa Meyrick, 1910
- Dichelopa sciota (Lower, 1916)
- Dichelopa sericopis Meyrick, 1926
- Dichelopa tarsodes Meyrick, 1910
- Dichelopa vaccinii Clarke, 1971
- Dichelopa zona Clarke, 1986

== See also ==
- List of Tortricidae genera
