= Alphitonia marquesensis =

Conservation status
- Endangered (IUCN 3.1)

Scientific classification
- Kingdom: Plantae
- Clade: Embryophytes
- Clade: Tracheophytes
- Clade: Spermatophytes
- Clade: Angiosperms
- Clade: Eudicots
- Clade: Rosids
- Order: Rosales
- Family: Rhamnaceae
- Genus: Alphitonia
- Species: A. marquesensis

Binomial name
- Alphitonia marquesensis F.Br. (1935)

Species of flowering plant

Alphitonia marquesensis is a species of flowering plant in the family Rhamnaceae. It is a tree endemic to the Marquesas Islands of French Polynesia, where it grows on the islands of Fatu Hiva, Hiva Oa, and Nuku Hiva.
