= Fatu-Hiva =

Commune in French Polynesia, France

- Commune
- Flag

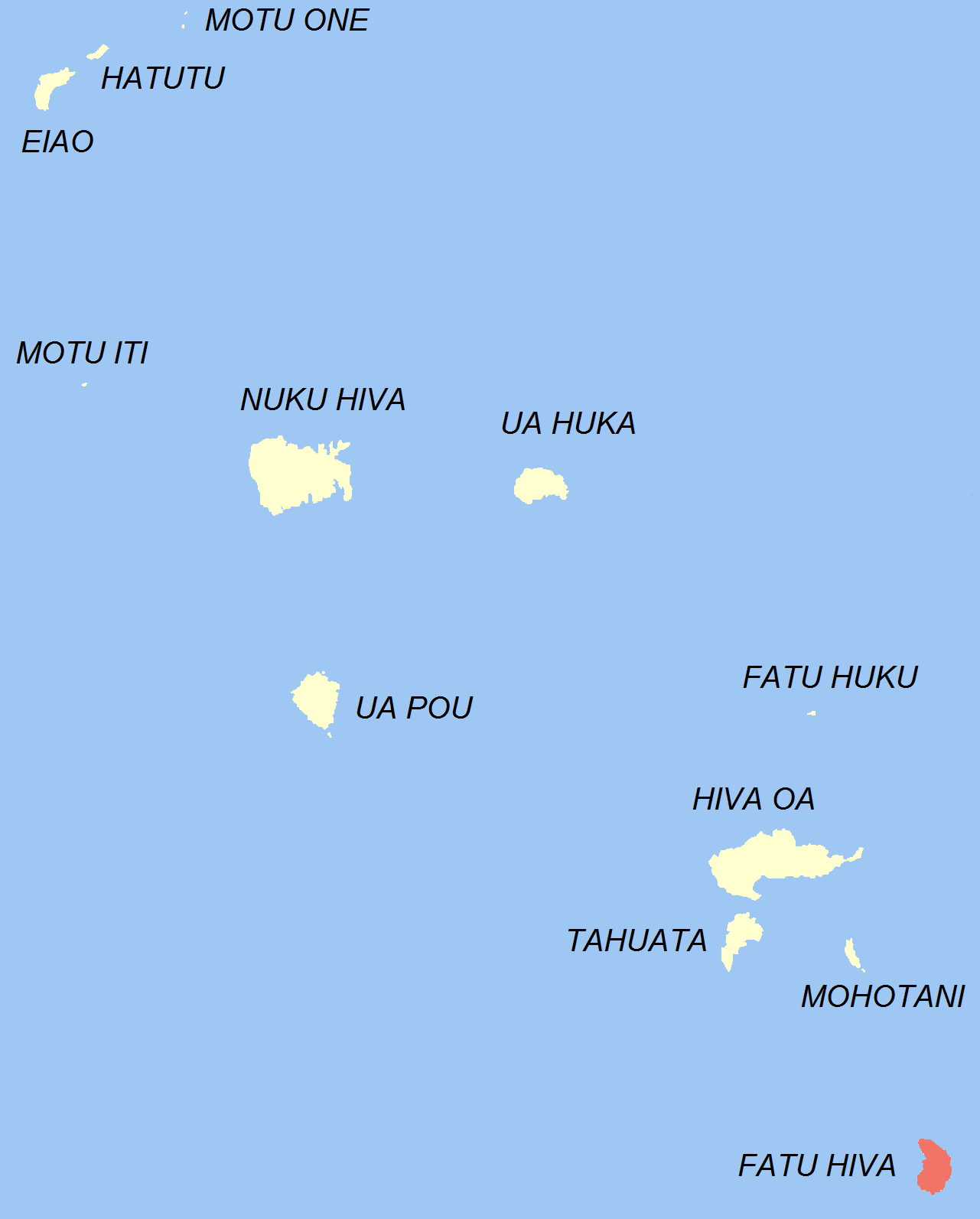
- Location of the commune (in red) within the Marquesas Islands
- Location of Fatu-Hiva
- Location within France
- Coordinates: 10°29′00″S 138°38′00″W
- Country: France
- Overseas collectivity: French Polynesia
- Subdivision: Marquesas Islands

Government
  - Mayor (2020–2026): Henri Tuieinui
- Area^{1}: 85 km^{2} (33 sq mi)
- Highest elevation: 1,125 m (3,691 ft)
- Lowest elevation: 0 m (0 ft)
- Population (2022): 600
  - Density: 7.1/km^{2} (18/sq mi)
- Time zone: UTC−09:30
- INSEE/Postal code: 98718 /98740
- ^{1} French Land Register data, which excludes lakes, ponds, glaciers > 1 km^{2} (0.386 sq mi or 247 acres) and river estuaries.

Fatu-Hiva (the "H" is not pronounced, see name section below) is the southernmost island of the Marquesas Islands in French Polynesia, an overseas territory of France in the Pacific Ocean. With Motu Nao as its closest neighbour, it is also the most isolated of the inhabited islands.

Fatu Hiva is also the title of a book by explorer and archaeologist Thor Heyerdahl, in which he describes his stay on the island in the 1930s.

== Name ==
The name of the island in Marquesan is Fatu Iva (without "h": [ˈfatu ˈiva]). However, the name was recorded by Europeans as Fatu-Hiva, perhaps due to other Marquesan islands (such as Nuku-Hiva and Hiva-Oa) containing the element Hiva, or because the letter "h" is silent in French. The spelling Fatu-Hiva has now become official.

The island was also named Isla Magdalena ("Magdalene Island") by Spanish explorers in the 16th century, but this name was rarely used.

Hatauheva is another name form that appears in 1817, coined by Camille de Roquefeuil during his voyage around the world on the "Bordelais".

The spelling Fatou-Hiva appears in 1838 in a work by Jules Dumont d'Urville.

== History ==
=== First settlers ===
Like the other islands of the archipelago, Fatu Iva was originally populated by Polynesians, who probably came from Western Polynesia.

Rivalries between the different valleys were frequent. In one case, some time around the middle of the 19th century, the Anainoapa tribe of Hanavave and the Tiu of Omoa confronted each other. The latter, defeated, fled the island on bamboo rafts and ended up in the Tuamotus, on Napuka Atoll, where their descendants still live. The Tiu sorcerer, who remained on Fatu Iva, revealed to the victors the names of the places in the valley (a way of acknowledging their sovereignty), and had himself buried alive, head down, symbolizing his defeat and the end of his tribe.

Little is known of Fatu Hiva culture before European influence, as it was greatly affected by the arrival of the missionaries. Stratified tribal societies were formed in the great valleys, as in the rest of the Marquesas Islands. In 1897, the German explorer Karl von den Steinen described nine tribes inhabiting the Hanamoohe, Hanateone, Hanahouuna, Ouia, Hanavave and Omoa valleys. In the Hanavave valley, four tribes are known from archaeological evidence.

Systematic archaeological excavations have not yet been carried out. Surface investigations were carried out by the American anthropologist Ralph Linton on behalf of the Bishop Museum of Honolulu in 1920–1921. The finds are less numerous than on the other islands of the Marquesas and indicate less extensive building activity. Linton found the remains of several tohua (ceremonial and power centers), with paepae (dwelling platforms)and small me'ae (temples or sacred spaces) in the Omoa Valley. This led Linton to suspect that several tribes had resided there. During his brief visit to the Hanavave Valley, Linton was only able to find small remains of a tohua and a ceremonial stone platform. Unlike the other islands of the Marquesas, the dead of Fatu Hiva were occasionally mummified (smoked) and often buried in the dwellings.

No colossal stone statues have been found on the island, but some small, crude stone sculptures have been preserved. This does not mean that there were no outstanding works of art on Fatu Hiva in prehistoric times. The island was known for tattoo artists and wood carvers, whose ephemeral works have barely survived the ages.

=== European exploration and colonization ===
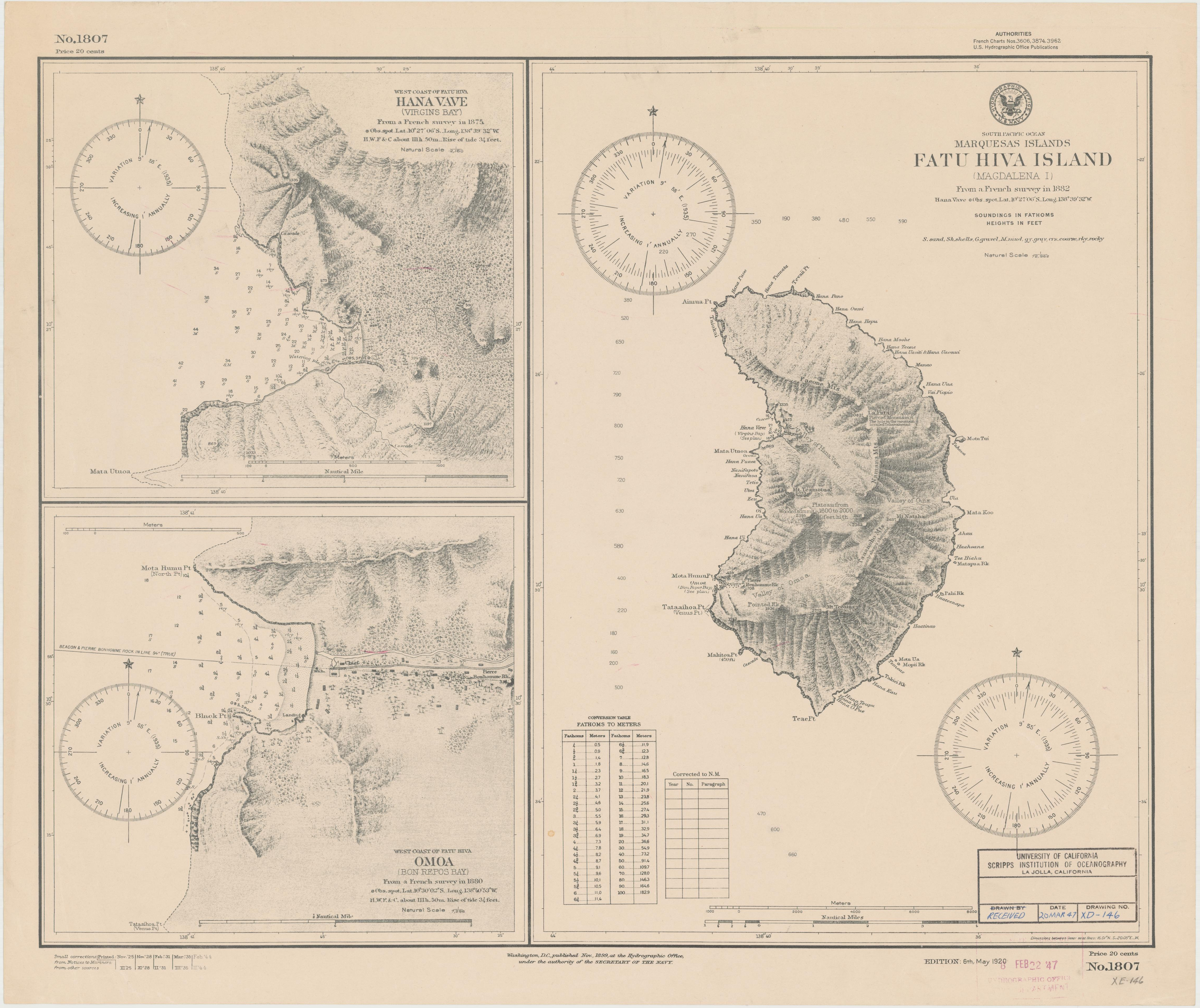
Nautical charts of Fatu Hiva, Marquesas Islands (1920)

From a Western perspective, the first explorer to discover Fatu Iva was the Spanish navigator Álvaro de Mendaña, on 21 July 1595. It was the first island in the archipelago that he saw, but he was unable to land there because he could not find a safe anchorage. He mistakenly believed that he had found the Solomon Islands, the goal of his voyage, before realizing that he had just discovered a new land. He named the archipelago "Marquesas de Mendoza", in honor of the viceroy of Peru at the time, who had helped him launch his expedition, "wishing to show his gratitude for the help he had given him". As Mendaña arrived during the vigil of St. Mary Magdalene in 1595, he named the island "Isla Magdalena".

In 1937 and 1938, Norwegian anthropologist and adventurer Thor Heyerdahl and his wife Liv lived for a year and a half in Fatu Iva, first in Omoa and then in Ouia, a now-deserted valley on the eastern coast of the island. Officially commissioned by the University of Oslo to investigate the distribution and spread of animal species among the Polynesian islands, his most personal goal on this trip, which was also his wedding trip, was to "sail the South Seas" and never return. The couple landed on Omoa in 1937, but found that civilization was still too much for their liking. They crossed the island and settled in Ouia, on the east coast of the island, a valley formerly inhabited by Marquesans. However, after a year and a half, mosquitoes, disease and bad weather dampened their enthusiasm. He recounted his experience in the book Paa Jakt efter Paradiset (1938), rewritten in 1974 and published as Fatu Hiva: Back to Nature.

In the early 1960s, until 1966, most of the island's men went to work in Moruroa, in the Tuamotu archipelago, on the construction of the Pacific Nuclear Experimental Center.

On 11 March 2011, Swiss explorer Raphaël Domjan, expedition leader of the PlanetSolar adventure, the first ship to circumnavigate the planet on solar power, called at Fatu Hiva.

== Geography ==
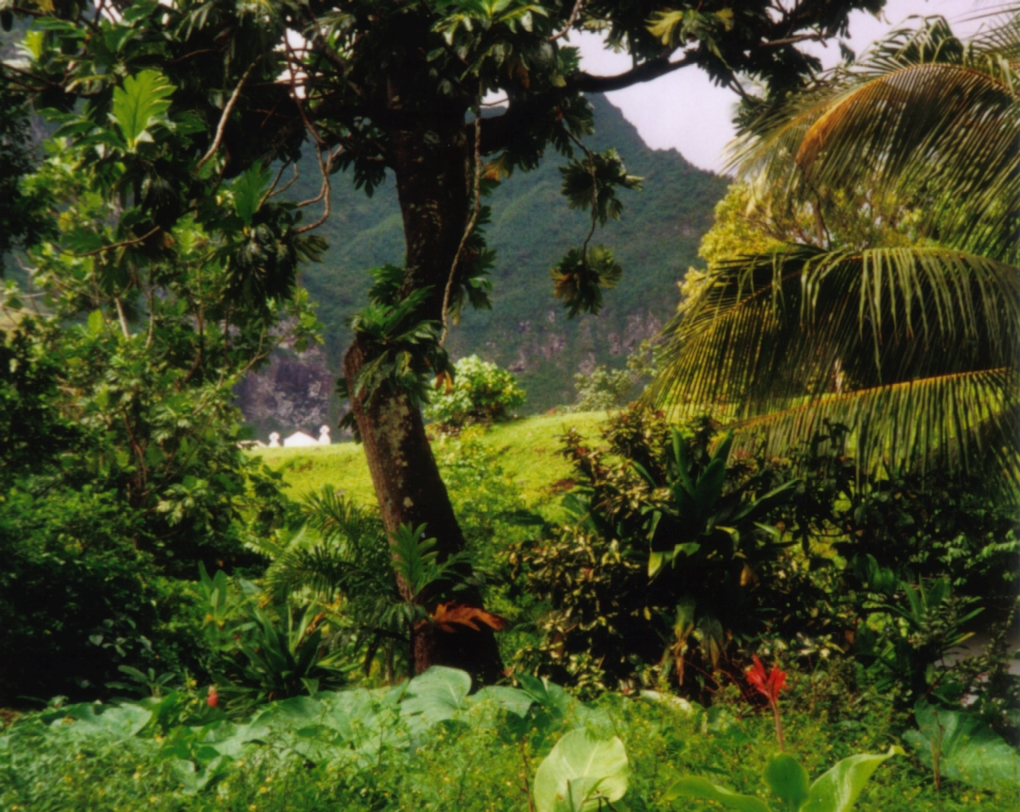
Rainforest on Fatu-Hiva

The eastern coastline of Fatu-Hiva is characterized by a number of narrow valleys, carved by streams that lead to the interior. Between these valleys are headlands which terminate in cliffs that plunge directly into the sea, making travel between them possible only by crossing the high mountain ridges, or by boat. The largest of these valleys is at Uia.

The western coastline has two significant bays, Hana Vave (also known as Bay of Virgins or Baie des Vierges) in the north, one of the most picturesque sites in the South Pacific, and the well-protected harbor of Omoa near the south. There are several smaller valleys between these two.

The centre of the island is a plateau which is covered largely by tall grasses and pandanus trees. To the south of the plateau, running to the south, is a mountain ridge, called Tauauoho, its highest peak, at 1,125 m (3,691 ft) is the highest point on Fatu-Hiva. Proceeding to the north and northwest from the plateau is a mountain ridge called Fa‘e One, the highest peak of which is 820 m (2,690 ft).

=== Geology ===
Fatu Hiva is formed by the eastern half of two interlocking volcanoes.

The first caldera, about 8 km (5 mi) in diameter, has a sharply cut rim, formed by a hemicircular series of peaks rising to over 1,000 m (3,300 ft). It is composed mainly of basalt, picrite and hawaiite. Its age is dated between 2.46 and 1.81 million years. The second caldera, located within the first, has a diameter of 3 to 4 km (1.9 to 2.5 mi). It was created by a powerful eruption, as evidenced by the impressive basalt columns, the "statues" of the Virgin, in Hanavave Bay, caused by lahars. It dates to between 1.68 and 1.33 million years ago. The main explosion seems to date back to 1.40 Ma2.

The valleys of the two villages of the island are located at the extremes of the space between the two calderas.

=== Flora ===
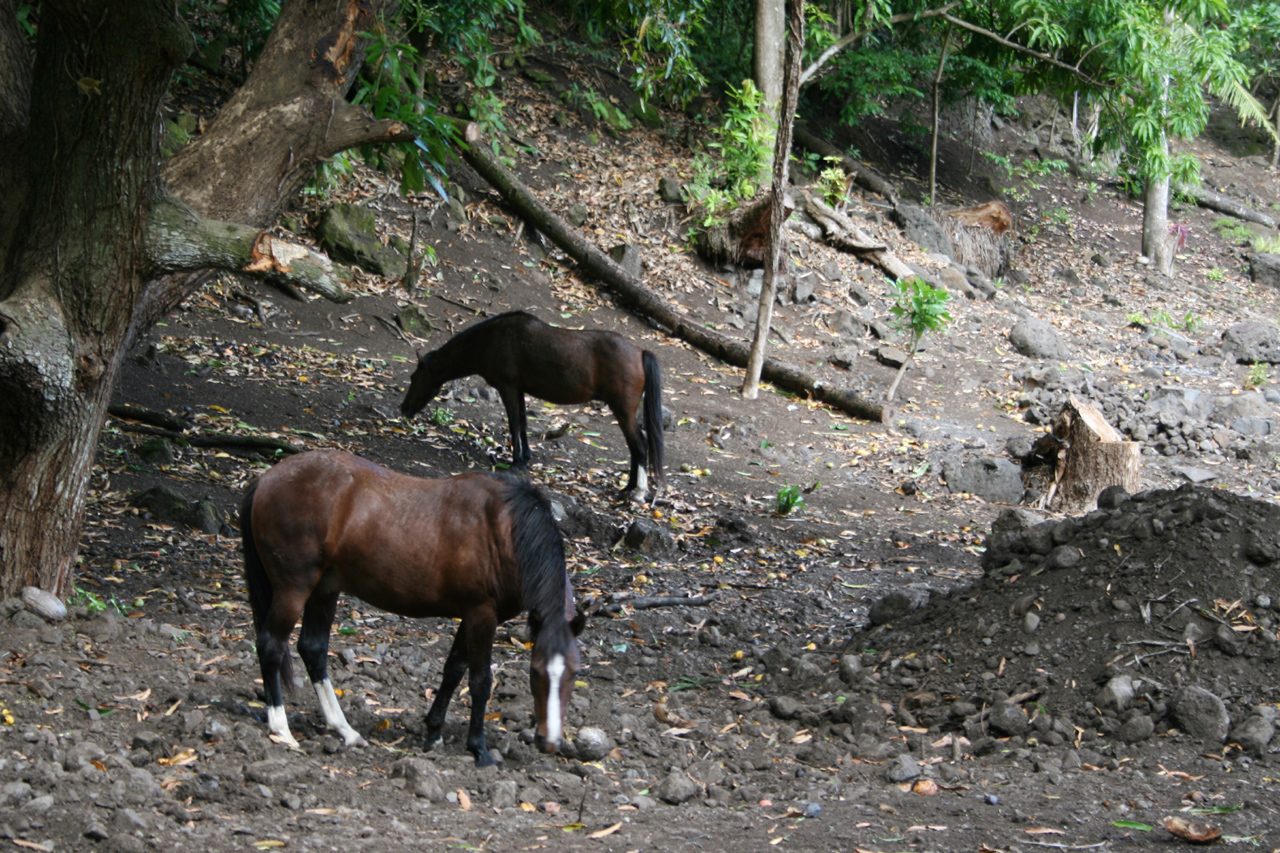
Horses at Fatu Hiva

The landscape surrounding the settlements in the coastal zone and in the valleys has been extensively remodelled for human food production, so little of the original vegetation remains. Massive interventions, already in historical times, probably caused the extinction of an unknown number of endemic and native plants in the lower and middle areas of the island. The present inhabitants cultivate breadfruit, coconut, yam, taro, sweet potatoes, bananas and other fruits.

The higher areas of the mountainous island are covered with mountain rainforest and cloud forest interspersed with tree ferns. Above 600 m (2,000 ft), grass forests, with the trees Metrosideros sp. and Pterophylla marquesana, dominate. However, even these inaccessible areas are threatened as feral goats are seriously affecting the flora. Peak tops and extensive leeward areas of the mountains are arid.

The mountain rainforest still harbours some endemic plants, such as Ochrosia fatuhivensis and Melicope fatuhivensis (syn. Pelea fatuhivensis), a tree of the Rutaceae family which may already be extinct. Pterophylla tremuloides is an endemic shrub which grows in low ridge top and cliff shrubland with Metrosideros, Dicranopteris and Lycopodium from 700 to 850 m (2,300 to 2,790 ft) elevation. A systematic study of the flora in 1988, supported by the Smithsonian Institution, counted 175 native, 21 endemic, and 136 anthropochoric plants.

=== Fauna ===
The rich flora contrasts with a relatively species-poor fauna. It is limited to land and sea birds, small mammals, insects, spiders and lizards. The Fatu Hiva monarch (Pomarea whitneyi), a bird of the family Monarchidae, is endemic.

== Administration ==
Administratively, Fatu-Hiva forms the commune (municipality) of Fatu-Hiva, part of the administrative subdivision of the Marquesas Islands. The commune consists solely of Fatu-Hiva itself. Its administrative seat is the settlement of Omoa, on the island's southwestern side.

== Demographics ==
Fatu-Hiva's population was 584 at the 2002 census, 611 in 2012, and 600 in 2022. Its main villages are Omoa, which is the capital and is situated in Omoa bay, and Hanavave, which is in Hanavave bay. The population lives mainly on agriculture, handicrafts and tourism. The island's orography does not allow the construction of an airstrip; it is accessible only by boat.

Fatu-Hiva experienced a demographic decline beginning in the late 1990s, for two main reasons:

- School emigration: as there is no secondary school on the island, young people must leave at a young age—first to Hiva Oa, then to Papeete—to pursue their studies. Many do not return to Fatu-Hiva afterwards.
- Economic emigration: the island's development prospects are limited by its isolation, as it is the most remote of the islands of the archipelago, and its rugged terrain prevents the building of an airstrip.

However, since 2007, there has been a demographic recovery, with censuses showing a 4% population increase in five years, spread primarily across the villages of Hana Vave, Omoa and Uia.

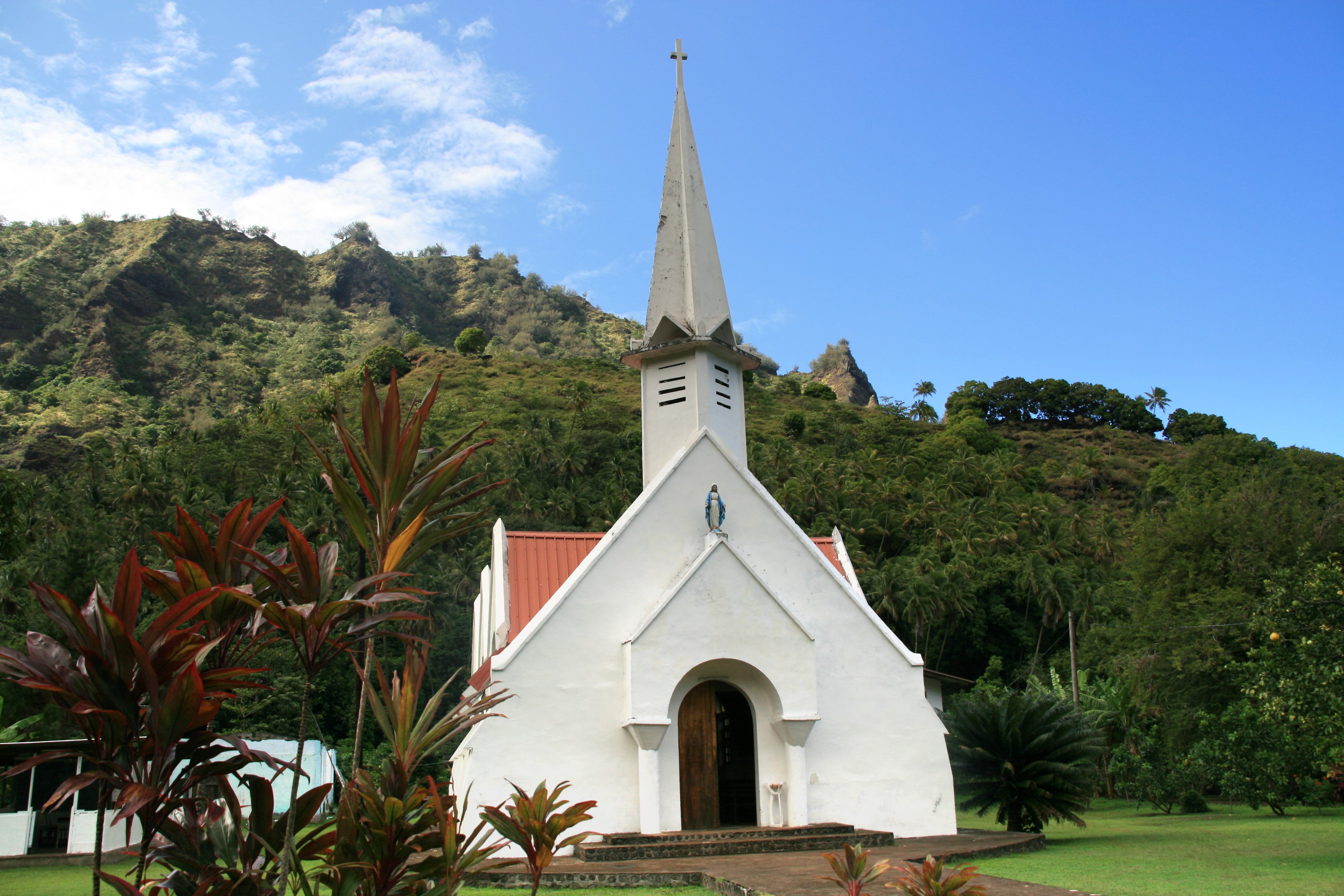
Church of Our Lady of Peace (Église de Notre-Dame-de-Paix) in the town of Omoa

=== Religion ===
The island was converted to Christianity by Catholic missionaries in 1877. The Catholic Church administers two religious buildings on the island under the Diocese of Taiohae (Dioecesis Taiohaënus seu Humanae Telluris or Diocèse de Taiohae): The Church of Saint Michael in Hanavave (Église de Saint-Michel), and the Church of Our Lady of Peace in Omoa (Église de Notre-Dame-de-Paix).

== Economy ==
The primary sector is still predominant in Fatu-Hiva, with a focus on fishing, especially tuna, mackerel, bonito, swordfish and marlin, as well as crayfish. The municipality has a cold storage facility that allows fish to be stored while waiting for cargo ships to sell the merchandise. Copra cultivation is still very important, as is the more recent cultivation of noni. Coffee cultivation was practically abandoned in the second half of the 20th century. For their personal needs, the inhabitants also hunt wild pigs and goats, and gather seafood and fruit in great abundance. They do not hesitate to offer fruit spontaneously to visitors.

Since the 1960s and 1970s, handicrafts have developed considerably, thanks mainly to tourism. The Island's speciality is the tapa. Today they are still made in the traditional way, mainly in monochrome. However, chemical dyes are now used alongside traditional methods like soot made from luminous walnut.

The currency is the CFP franc, which is pegged to the euro.

The islanders live mainly from subsistence farming. Selling monoi oil, carvings and painted bark raffia to infrequent cruise ship tourists and other sailors generates some income.

=== Tourism ===
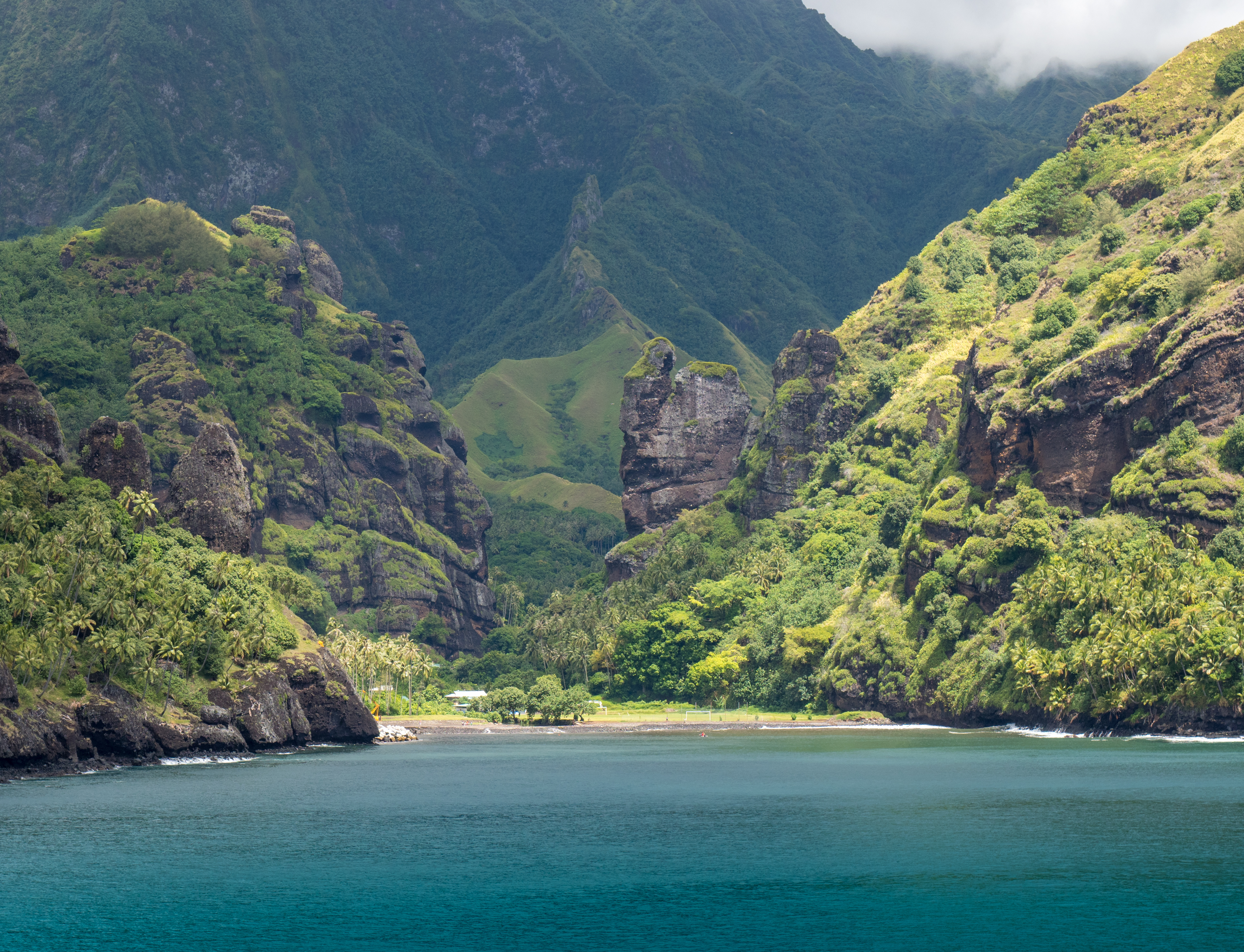
Baie des Vierges (Hanavave), Fatu Hiva, Marquesas Islands, French Polynesia

Tourism is limited due to the lack of an airport, though the island is visited by cruise ships. There is only limited tourist infrastructure, with no banks, ATM machines or taxis, and only limited accommodation. Fatu Hiva has no bathing beaches.

The three-hour hike between the two villages is steep but offers views of the island, ocean and waterfalls.

The Grélet Museum in Omoa holds a collection of local artifacts, including war clubs, tikis and carved wood bowls.

== Politics and government ==
Politically, the island belongs to French Polynesia (French: Pays d'Outre-Mer - POM) and is therefore affiliated with the European Union. It is administered by a subdivision (Subdivision administrative des Îles Marquises) of the High Commissariat of the Republic in French Polynesia (Haut-commissariat de la République en Polynésie française) based in Papeete. Fatu Hiva forms an independent municipality (Commune de Fatu Hiva). As of 2012 it had 636 inhabitants and a population density of about 7 inhabitants/km^{2}.

The official language is French. The main town and administrative centre is the village of Omoa, on the west coast, with about 250 inhabitants.

== Infrastructure ==
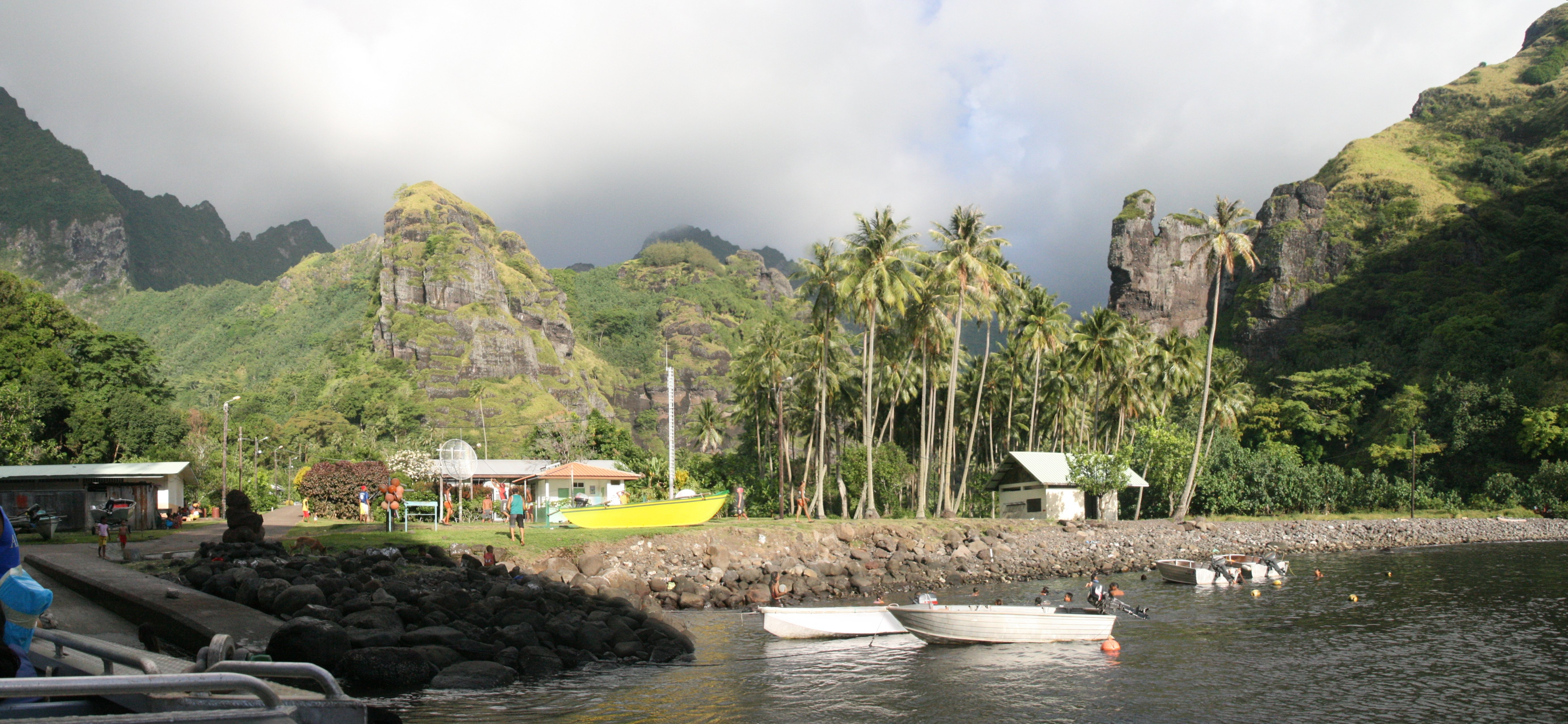
Hanavave village and harbour, Fatu Hiva Island

The inhabitants of this 8,400 ha (32 sq mi) island live mainly in the villages of Omoa and Hanavave, on the west coast, which are connected by a dirt road through the mountains. The largest of the villages is Omoa, which has a Catholic church, a nursery and elementary school, a small shop, a post office and a satellite telephone. Fatu Hiva has no paved roads between the two villages, no harbor dock for large ships and no airfield. Safe landing on the difficult-to-access coast is only possible in the two bays on the west coast, where the villages are located.

The 17 km (11 mi) road linking the two villages is very bumpy, especially near Hanavave, and the rains often make the road sweeping and dangerous for traffic. The inhabitants prefer to use a boat to reach the other village, which takes about 15 minutes.

== Fatu Hiva in literature ==
The island became better known through the book of the same name by Thor Heyerdahl, who spent about eight months on the island in 1937 with his first wife Liv in a self-imposed robinsonade. The couple lived first near the west coast in the Omoa Valley, and later on the east coast in Ouia, which is now uninhabited. In 1937, there was also an old man named Tei Tetua who was, by his own account, the son of one of the last true cannibals and who lived there accompanied by his twelve-year-old adopted daughter.

A first book about the stay was published in 1938 by Gyldendal in Oslo, sold poorly despite good reviews and was never translated, probably because of the World War II. Heyerdahl's well-known book, Fatu Hiva, was later rewritten. According to the author's note, after the success of his book, his first work had become outdated.

In Jack London's short story collection "A Son of the Sun", the island appears under the name Fitu-Iva. In the story "Feathers of the Sun," Fitu-Iva falls under the influence of a cunning Solomon Islands swindler who, with the connivance of the ever-elusive chief, introduces paper money and exchanges all valuables for domestically manufactured currency. When the fraud is discovered, he is beaten with a dead pig, a particularly dishonorable punishment, and banished from the island.

== See also ==
- Overseas France
- Dependent Territory
