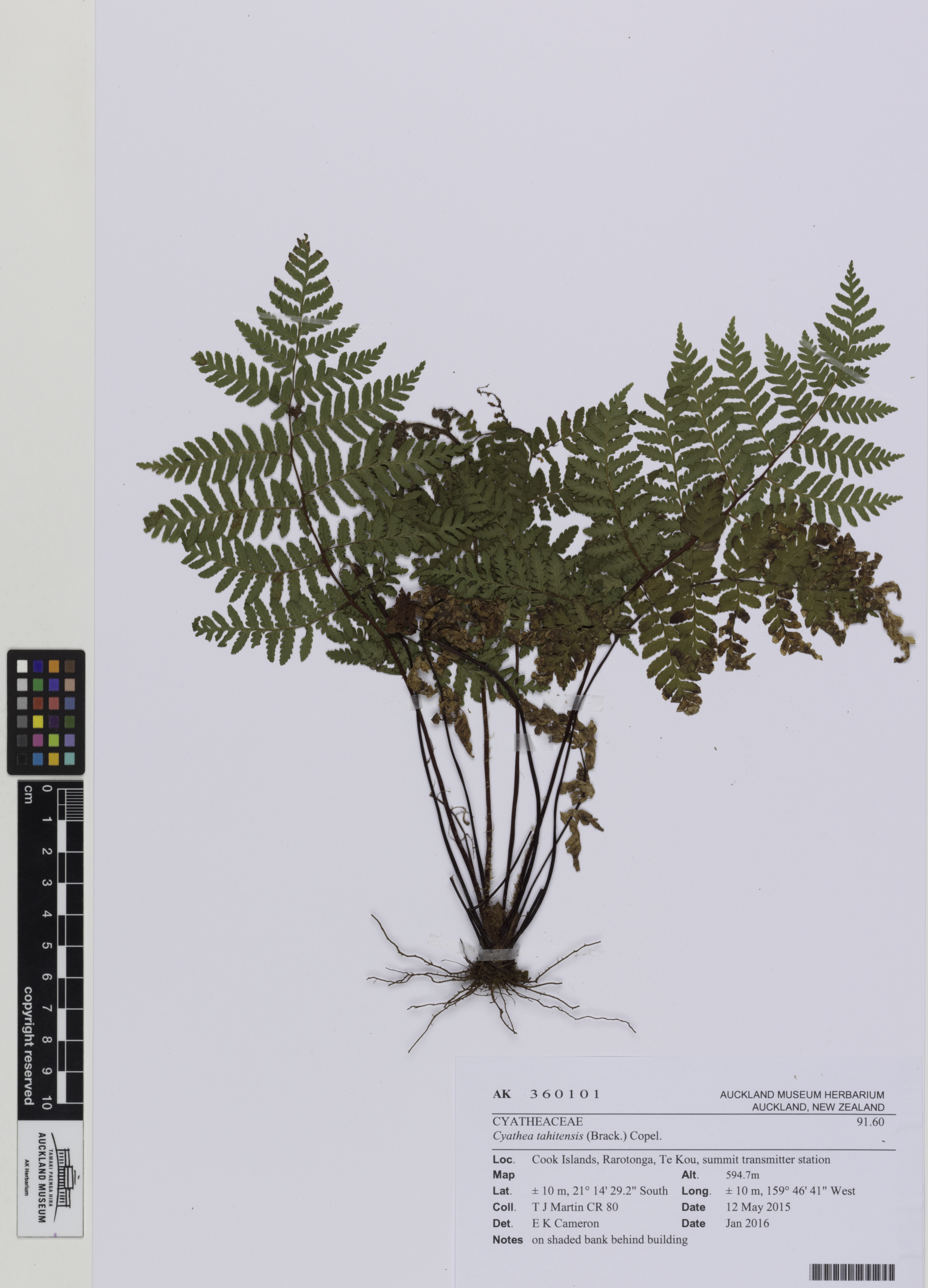

Scientific classification
- Kingdom: Plantae
- Clade: Tracheophytes
- Division: Polypodiophyta
- Class: Polypodiopsida
- Order: Cyatheales
- Family: Cyatheaceae
- Genus: Cyathea
- Species: C. affinis

Binomial name
- Cyathea affinis (G.Forst.) Sw.

Synonyms
- Alsophila tahitensis Brack.; Amphicosmia tahitensis (Brack.) Moore; Cyathea bisulca Schkuhr; Cyathea rapensis Copel.; Cyathea tahitensis (Brack.) Copel.; Cyathea thurstonii Baker; Hemitelia durvillei Mett. ex Kuhn; Hemitelia raiateensis J.W.Moore; Hemitelia tahitensis (Brack.) Mett.; Polypodium affine G.Forst.

= Cyathea affinis =

Species of plant

Cyathea affinis is a variable species of tree fern native to Fiji, Samoa, the Cook Islands, Austral Islands, Tahiti, and the Marquesas Islands. The trunk of this plant is erect and 2–6 metres (6 ft 7 in – 19 ft 8 in) tall. Fronds are bipinnate and 2–3 metres (6 ft 7 in – 9 ft 10 in) in length. The rachis and stipe are pale to brown in colour, or flushed with red towards the pinnule rachis. The stipe is sparsely covered in narrow basal scales, which are pale to dark and have broad fragile edges. Characteristically of this species, the lowest one or two pairs of pinnae may be slightly reduced and occur towards the base of the stipe. Sori are located near the pinnule midvein and are partially or fully covered by indusia, which open towards the pinnule margin.

Large and Braggins (2004) note that there is much variation between individual plants of C. affinis in terms of frond and scale details and Cyathea tahitensis, which is usually regarded as synonymous, may in fact represent a separate species.

Cyathea affinis (G.Forst.) Sw. is not to be confused with Cyathea affinis Brack, a synonym of Sphaeropteris propinqua, nor Cyathea affinis A.Rojas, a synonym of Cyathea retanae.

Young shoots of C. affinis are eaten in the Marquesas Islands.
