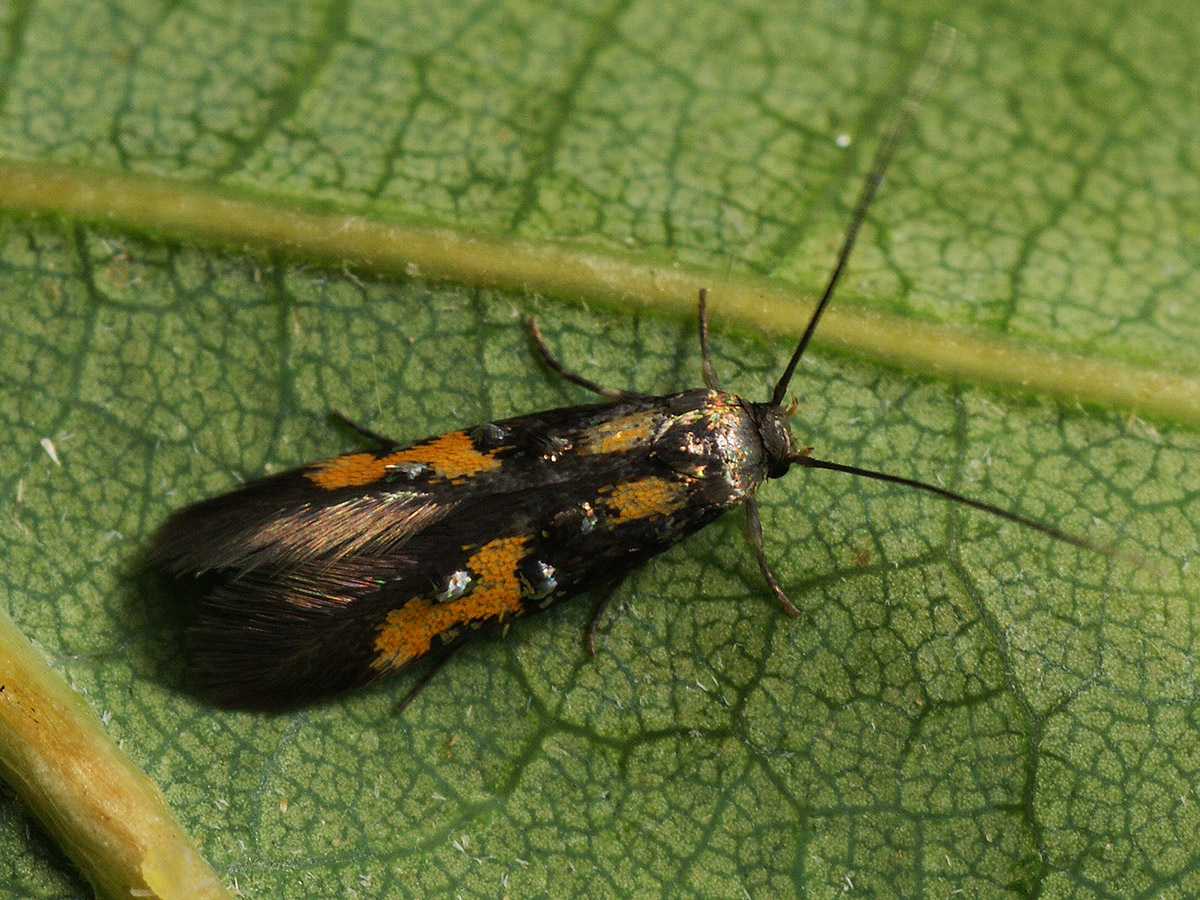

Scientific classification
- Domain: Eukaryota
- Kingdom: Animalia
- Phylum: Arthropoda
- Class: Insecta
- Order: Lepidoptera
- Family: Elachistidae
- Genus: Chrysoclista
- Species: C. lathamella

Binomial name
- Chrysoclista lathamella (T. B. Fletcher, 1936)

Synonyms
- List: Glyphipteryx lathamella T. B. Fletcher, 1936; Tinea bimaculella Haworth, 1828 (junior primary homonym of Tinea bimaculella Thunberg, 1794); Chrysoclista razowskii Riedl, 1965

= Chrysoclista lathamella =

Species of moth

Chrysoclista lathamella is a species of moth of the family Agonoxenidae described by Thomas Bainbrigge Fletcher in 1936. It is found in northern Europe (it is not present on the Iberian Peninsula, Balkan Peninsula and Italy).

The wingspan is 11–13 mm. C. lathamella differs from Chrysoclista linneella, Chrysoclista splendida and Chrysoclista abchasica by the dark border on the anterior and posterior margins of the forewings. Both edges merge in front of the middle of the wings, so that the orange basic coloration is divided into two spots. The basal spot is smaller and lies completely below the costal fold.

The genital armature of the males is similar to that of Chrysoclista splendida, but the gnathos arms are straighter, distally slightly dilated and more spinous. The valves taper apically much stronger. The anellus lobes are less slender and about half as long as the valvae. The aedeagus is only slightly curved.

The genital armature of the females is similar to that of Chrysoclista splendida, but the sclerotization of the eighth tergite is reduced to two narrow, curved, lateral bands. The antrum is funnel-shaped and the ductus bursae is almost twice as long as the corpus bursae.

Similar species A similar species is Chrysoclista zagulajevi

Adults are on wing from June to August.

The larvae feed on willow (Salix species), probably including white willow (S. alba), crack willow (S. fragilis) and pussy willow (S. caprea). They mine the bark of their host plant.
