= Pammeces picticornis =

Scientific classification
- Domain: Eukaryota
- Kingdom: Animalia
- Phylum: Arthropoda
- Class: Insecta
- Order: Lepidoptera
- Family: Elachistidae
- Genus: Pammeces
- Species: P. picticornis

Binomial name
- Pammeces picticornis (Walsingham, 1897)

Synonyms
- Coleophora picticornis Walsingham, 1897; Pammces picticornis

Species of moth

Pammeces picticornis is a species of moth of the family Agonoxenidae. It is found in the West Indies (Puerto Rico and the U.S. Virgin Islands).

== Taxonomy ==
The species was described in the family Coleophoridae.
