= Chrysoclista thrypsiphila =

Scientific classification
- Kingdom: Animalia
- Phylum: Arthropoda
- Class: Insecta
- Order: Lepidoptera
- Family: Elachistidae
- Genus: Chrysoclista
- Species: C. thrypsiphila

Binomial name
- Chrysoclista thrypsiphila Meyrick, 1912

Species of moth

Chrysoclista thrypsiphila is a moth of the family Agonoxenidae. It was described by Edward Meyrick in 1912. It is found in Sri Lanka.
