= Palaeomystella chalcopeda =

Scientific classification
- Kingdom: Animalia
- Phylum: Arthropoda
- Class: Insecta
- Order: Lepidoptera
- Family: Elachistidae
- Subfamily: Agonoxeninae
- Genus: Palaeomystella
- Species: P. chalcopeda

Binomial name
- Palaeomystella chalcopeda (Meyrick, 1931)

Synonyms
- Palaeomystis chalcopeda Meyrick, 1931

Species of moth

Palaeomystella chalcopeda is a moth of the family Agonoxenidae. It is found in Brazil.
