= Chrysoclista hygrophilella =

Scientific classification
- Kingdom: Animalia
- Phylum: Arthropoda
- Class: Insecta
- Order: Lepidoptera
- Family: Elachistidae
- Genus: Chrysoclista
- Species: C. hygrophilella

Binomial name
- Chrysoclista hygrophilella Viette, 1957

Species of moth

Chrysoclista hygrophilella is a moth of the family Agonoxenidae. It was described by Pierre Viette in 1957. It is found on Réunion.
