= Palaeomystella tibouchinae =

Scientific classification
- Kingdom: Animalia
- Phylum: Arthropoda
- Clade: Pancrustacea
- Class: Insecta
- Order: Lepidoptera
- Family: Elachistidae
- Subfamily: Agonoxeninae
- Genus: Palaeomystella
- Species: P. tibouchinae

Binomial name
- Palaeomystella tibouchinae Becker & Adamski, 2008

Species of moth

Palaeomystella tibouchinae is a moth of the family Agonoxenidae. It is found in Brazil.

The length of the forewings is 9.2-10.3 mm.

The larvae feed on Tibouchina barbigera.

== Etymology ==
The species epithet tibouchinae is derived from the generic name of its plant host.
