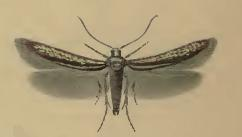

Scientific classification
- Kingdom: Animalia
- Phylum: Arthropoda
- Clade: Pancrustacea
- Class: Insecta
- Order: Lepidoptera
- Family: Coleophoridae
- Genus: Augasma
- Species: A. aeratella

Binomial name
- Augasma aeratella (Zeller, 1839)

Synonyms
- Elachista aeratella Zeller, 1839

= Augasma aeratella =

Species of moth

Augasma aeratella is a moth of the family Coleophoridae. It is found in most of Europe (except most Fennoscandia and parts of the Balkan Peninsula). The habitat consists of open landscapes of forest-steppe and steppe biotopes.

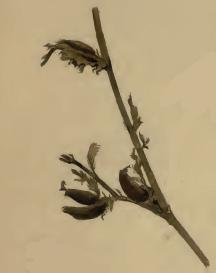
A sprig of Polygonim aviculare with pod-like galls caused by larva

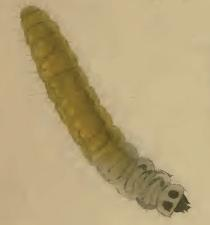
Larva

The wingspan is 9–10 mm. Adults are on wing from June to July in one generation per year.

The larva live in fusiform galls on the stems of Polygonum aviculare, Polygonum arenarium and Polygonum lapathifolium. They can be found from late June to mid-August.
