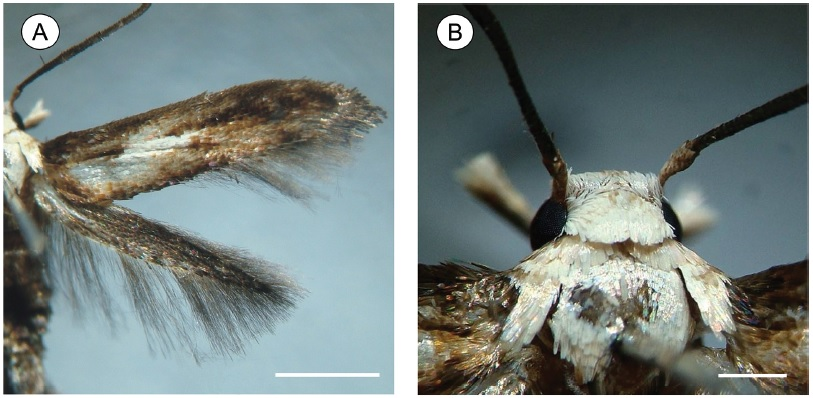
- Palaeomystella fernandesi head and thorax

Scientific classification
- Domain: Eukaryota
- Kingdom: Animalia
- Phylum: Arthropoda
- Class: Insecta
- Order: Lepidoptera
- Family: Elachistidae
- Genus: Palaeomystella
- Species: P. fernandesi

Binomial name
- Palaeomystella fernandesi Moreira & Becker, 2014

= Palaeomystella fernandesi =

Species of moth

Palaeomystella fernandesi is a moth of the family Agonoxenidae. It is found in Atlantic rain forest of Brazil.

The length of the forewings is 4.68–6.11 mm. The forewings are covered mostly by dark-brown scales dorsally, with three interconnected white areas that form a longitudinal S-like band. There is a tenuous, U-shaped band of pale-grey scales following the contours of the tornus. The hindwings are covered in dark brown scales on both sides. Adults are thought to emerge after the winter (September).

The larvae feed on Tibouchina sellowiana. They create a gall on their host plant. Pupation takes place inside the gall, within a cylindrical, longitudinally arranged cocoon made of woven white silk.

== Etymology ==
The species is named in honor of Prof. Dr. Geraldo Wilson Fernandes, Departamento de Biologia Geral, Instituto de Ciências Biológicas, Universidade Federal de Minas Gerais, for his contributions to the development of cecidology in the Neotropics.

== Gallery ==
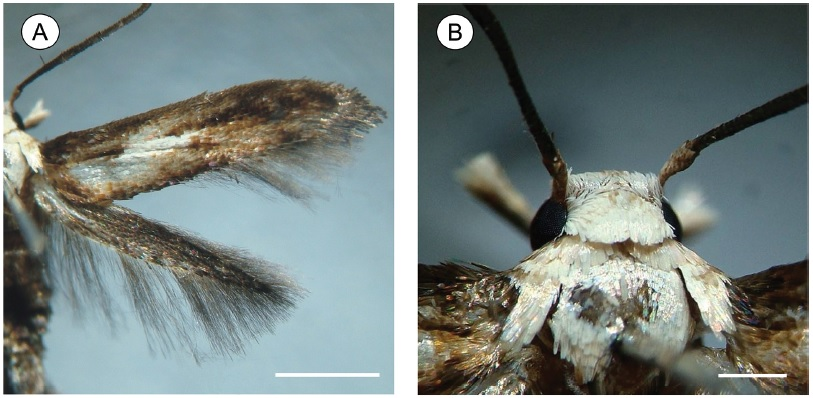
Head and thorax

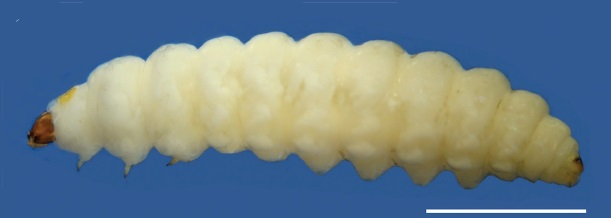
Last instar larva

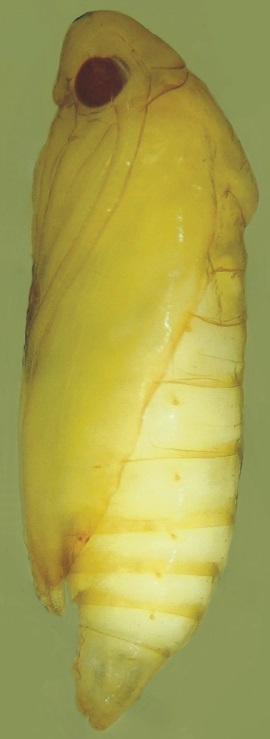
Pupa

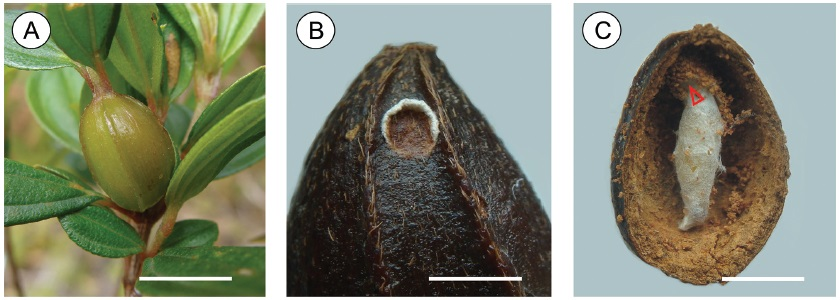
Gall on Tibouchina sellowiana; B operculum; C pupal cocoon dissected gall
