= Goniodoma nemesi =

Scientific classification
- Domain: Eukaryota
- Kingdom: Animalia
- Phylum: Arthropoda
- Class: Insecta
- Order: Lepidoptera
- Family: Coleophoridae
- Genus: Goniodoma
- Species: G. nemesi

Binomial name
- Goniodoma nemesi Capuse, 1970

Species of moth

Goniodoma nemesi is a moth of the family Coleophoridae. It is found in Croatia, Italy, Greece and Romania.
