= Chrysoclista monotyla =

Scientific classification
- Kingdom: Animalia
- Phylum: Arthropoda
- Class: Insecta
- Order: Lepidoptera
- Family: Elachistidae
- Genus: Chrysoclista
- Species: C. monotyla

Binomial name
- Chrysoclista monotyla Meyrick, 1921

Species of moth

Chrysoclista monotyla is a moth of the family Agonoxenidae. It was described by Edward Meyrick in 1921. It is found in Australia (Queensland).
