= Pammeces problema =

Scientific classification
- Domain: Eukaryota
- Kingdom: Animalia
- Phylum: Arthropoda
- Class: Insecta
- Order: Lepidoptera
- Family: Elachistidae
- Genus: Pammeces
- Species: P. problema

Binomial name
- Pammeces problema Walsingham, 1915

Species of moth

Pammeces problema is a moth of the family Agonoxenidae. It was described by Walsingham in 1915. It is found in Colombia.
