= Pammeces albivittella =

Scientific classification
- Kingdom: Animalia
- Phylum: Arthropoda
- Clade: Pancrustacea
- Class: Insecta
- Order: Lepidoptera
- Family: Elachistidae
- Genus: Pammeces
- Species: P. albivittella

Binomial name
- Pammeces albivittella Zeller, 1863

Species of moth

Pammeces albivittella is a moth of the family Agonoxenidae. It was described by Philipp Christoph Zeller in 1863. It is found in Venezuela.
