= Tocasta =

Scientific classification
- Kingdom: Animalia
- Phylum: Arthropoda
- Clade: Pancrustacea
- Class: Insecta
- Order: Lepidoptera
- Family: Elachistidae
- Subfamily: Agonoxeninae
- Genus: Tocasta; Busck, 1912
- Species: T. priscella

Binomial name
- Tocasta priscella Busck, 1912

Genus of moths

Tocasta is a genus of moths, belonging to the subfamily Agonoxeninae. It has been included in the Coleophoridae and Tineidae in the past. It consists of only one species, Tocasta priscella, which is found in Panama.
