= Augasma atraphaxidellum =

Scientific classification
- Domain: Eukaryota
- Kingdom: Animalia
- Phylum: Arthropoda
- Class: Insecta
- Order: Lepidoptera
- Family: Coleophoridae
- Genus: Augasma
- Species: A. atraphaxidellum

Binomial name
- Augasma atraphaxidellum Kuznetzov, 1957

Species of moth

Augasma atraphaxidellum is a moth of the family Coleophoridae. It is found in Russia and Armenia.

The larvae feed on Atraphaxis spinosa, Atraphaxis replicata and Atraphaxis virgata. They feed on the flower or shoot gall of their host plant.
