= Augasma nitens =

Scientific classification
- Domain: Eukaryota
- Kingdom: Animalia
- Phylum: Arthropoda
- Class: Insecta
- Order: Lepidoptera
- Family: Coleophoridae
- Genus: Augasma
- Species: A. nitens

Binomial name
- Augasma nitens Amsel, 1935

Species of moth

Augasma nitens is a moth of the family Coleophoridae. It is found in the Palestinian Territories and Israel.
