= Chrysoclista cambiella =

Scientific classification
- Domain: Eukaryota
- Kingdom: Animalia
- Phylum: Arthropoda
- Class: Insecta
- Order: Lepidoptera
- Family: Elachistidae
- Genus: Chrysoclista
- Species: C. cambiella

Binomial name
- Chrysoclista cambiella (Busck, 1915)

Synonyms
- Psacaphora cambiella Busck, 1915

Species of moth

Chrysoclista cambiella is a species of moth of the family Agonoxenidae. It is found in the United States (Oregon, Idaho and Montana) and Canada (British Columbia and Alberta).

The wingspan is about 12 mm for males and 13 mm for females.

The larvae feed on Salix species. They bore in the cambium of their host plant.
