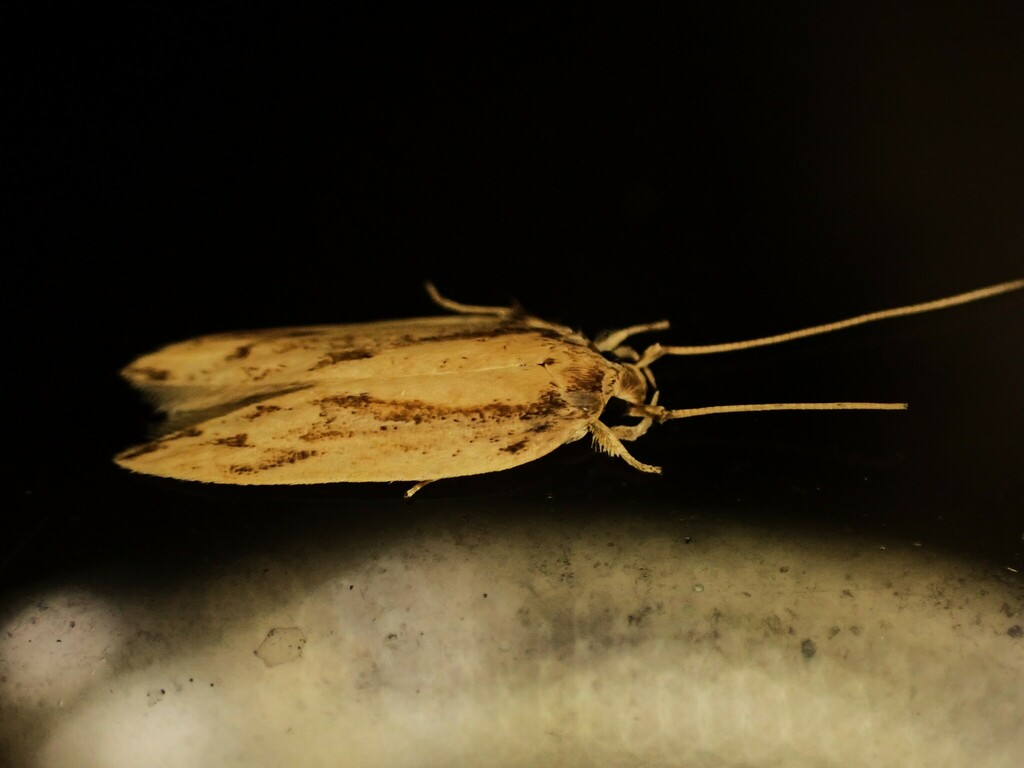

Scientific classification
- Kingdom: Animalia
- Phylum: Arthropoda
- Class: Insecta
- Order: Lepidoptera
- Family: Elachistidae
- Genus: Agonoxena
- Species: A. argaula

Binomial name
- Agonoxena argaula Meyrick, 1921

= Agonoxena argaula =

Species of moth

Agonoxena argaula, or the coconut flat moth, is a moth of the family Agonoxenidae. It was first described by Edward Meyrick in 1921 from Fiji and is also known from Guam, the New Hebrides, Tonga, Samoa, Ellice, Wallis, Futuna, and the Palmyra Atoll. It was first recorded in Hawaii in 1949. It is artificially spread by commerce.
