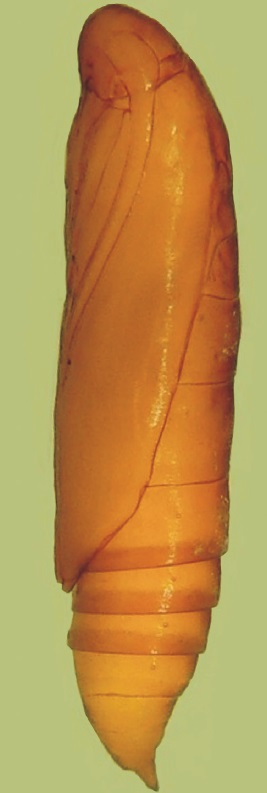
- Palaeomystella rosaemariae pupa

Scientific classification
- Domain: Eukaryota
- Kingdom: Animalia
- Phylum: Arthropoda
- Class: Insecta
- Order: Lepidoptera
- Family: Elachistidae
- Genus: Palaeomystella
- Species: P. rosaemariae

Binomial name
- Palaeomystella rosaemariae Moreira & Becker, 2014

= Palaeomystella rosaemariae =

Species of moth

Palaeomystella rosaemariae is a moth of the family Agonoxenidae. It is found in the Atlantic Forest of Coxilha das Lombas in Brazil.

The length of the forewings is 4.81-5.59 mm. The forewings are covered mostly by pale-brown scales dorsally, intermixed with scattered, pale-brown scales tipped with dark brown, and with longitudinally aligned groups of brown scales. There is a narrow, ill-defined, dark-brown streak bisecting the wing longitudinally from the base to the tornus. The hindwings are covered in pale brown scales on both sides.

The larvae feed on Tibouchina asperior. They create a gall on their host plant. The larvae construct a cocoon by tying together small pieces of dried leaves with silk, where pupation takes place.

== Gallery ==
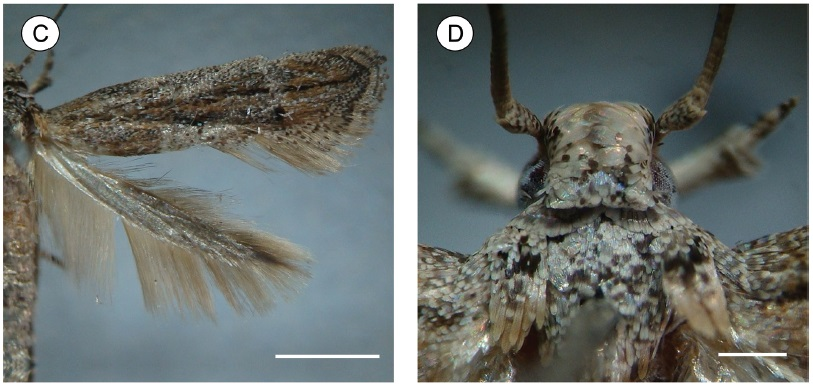
Head and thorax

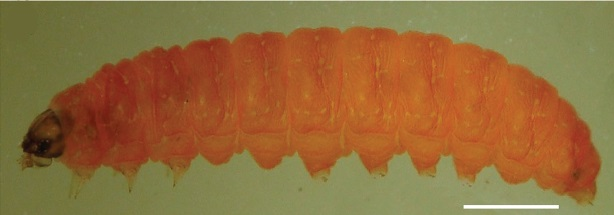
Last instar larva

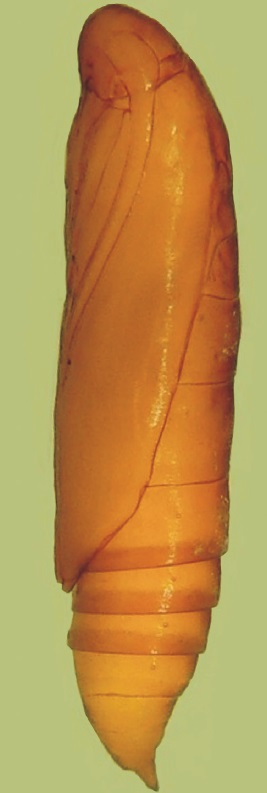
Pupa

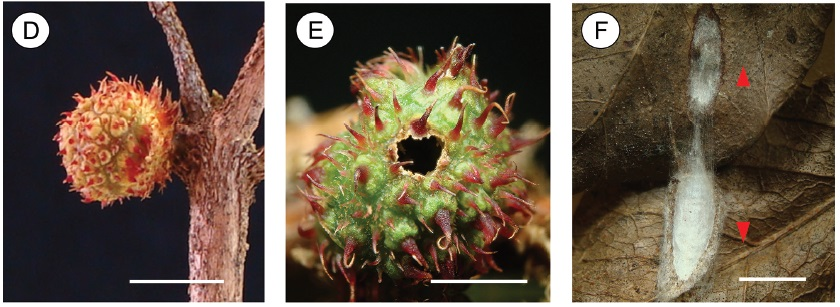
Gall on Tibouchina asperior; E exit hole; F pupal cocoon

== Etymology ==
The species is named in honor of Prof. Dr. Rosy Mary dos Santos Isaias, an anatomist of the Departamento de Botânica, Instituto de Ciências Biológicas, Universidade Federal de Minas Gerais.
