= Palaeomystella henriettiphila =

Scientific classification
- Kingdom: Animalia
- Phylum: Arthropoda
- Clade: Pancrustacea
- Class: Insecta
- Order: Lepidoptera
- Family: Elachistidae
- Genus: Palaeomystella
- Species: P. henriettiphila

Binomial name
- Palaeomystella henriettiphila Becker & Adamski, 2008

Species of moth

Palaeomystella henriettiphila is a moth of the family Agonoxenidae. It is found in Brazil and French Guiana.

The length of the forewings is 7.3-9.2 mm.

The larvae feed on Henriettea succosa. They create a cataplasmatic histioid gall on their host plant. The larvae are pale gray and 4.6-5.6 mm long.
