= Pammeces phlogophora =

Scientific classification
- Domain: Eukaryota
- Kingdom: Animalia
- Phylum: Arthropoda
- Class: Insecta
- Order: Lepidoptera
- Family: Elachistidae
- Genus: Pammeces
- Species: P. phlogophora

Binomial name
- Pammeces phlogophora Walsingham, 1909

Species of moth

Pammeces phlogophora is a moth of the family Agonoxenidae. It was described by Walsingham in 1909. It is found in Panama.
