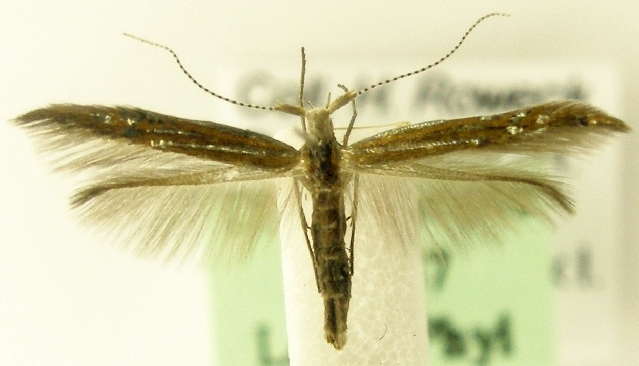

Scientific classification
- Domain: Eukaryota
- Kingdom: Animalia
- Phylum: Arthropoda
- Class: Insecta
- Order: Lepidoptera
- Family: Coleophoridae
- Genus: Goniodoma
- Species: G. limoniella

Binomial name
- Goniodoma limoniella (Stainton, 1884)

Synonyms
- Coleophora limoniella Stainton, 1884

= Goniodoma limoniella =

Species of moth

Goniodoma limoniella is a moth of the family Coleophoridae. It is found in western Europe (the coastal salt marshes of Great Britain, the Netherlands, Belgium and France) and the Mediterranean region (including the coast of Tunisia).

The wingspan is about 10 mm. Adults are on wing from July to August. Larvae can be found from September to May.
