= Goniodoma millierella =

Scientific classification
- Domain: Eukaryota
- Kingdom: Animalia
- Phylum: Arthropoda
- Class: Insecta
- Order: Lepidoptera
- Family: Coleophoridae
- Genus: Goniodoma
- Species: G. millierella

Binomial name
- Goniodoma millierella Ragonot, 1882

Species of moth

Goniodoma millierella is a moth of the family Coleophoridae. It is found in France, Italy and Tunisia.
