= Goniodoma sinica =

Scientific classification
- Domain: Eukaryota
- Kingdom: Animalia
- Phylum: Arthropoda
- Class: Insecta
- Order: Lepidoptera
- Family: Coleophoridae
- Genus: Goniodoma
- Species: G. sinica

Binomial name
- Goniodoma sinica Li & Zheng, 2002

Species of moth

Goniodoma sinica is a moth of the family Coleophoridae. It is found in China.
