= Palaeomystella tavaresi =

Scientific classification
- Domain: Eukaryota
- Kingdom: Animalia
- Phylum: Arthropoda
- Class: Insecta
- Order: Lepidoptera
- Family: Elachistidae
- Genus: Palaeomystella
- Species: P. tavaresi

Binomial name
- Palaeomystella tavaresi Moreira & Becker, 2014

Species of moth

Palaeomystella tavaresi is a moth of the family Agonoxenidae. It is found in the Atlantic Forest at the Serra Bonita Reserve in Brazil.

The length of the forewings is 7.02-9.23 mm. The forewings are covered by brown scales dorsally, intermixed with dark-brown scales tipped with black, and pale-brown scales. There is a narrow, ill-defined, dark-brown streak which bisects the wing longitudinally from the base to a brown, subapical, crescentic marking, edged distally with dark-grey scales. The hindwings are covered with light brown scales on both sides.

The larvae feed on Tibouchina fissinervia. They create a gall on their host plant.

== Gallery ==
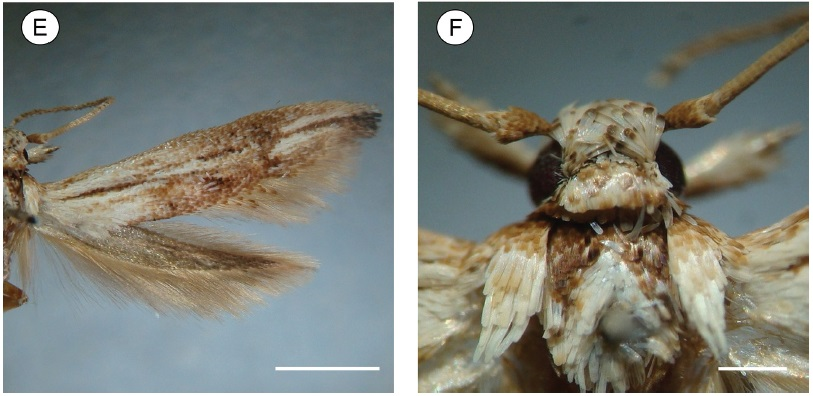
Head and thorax

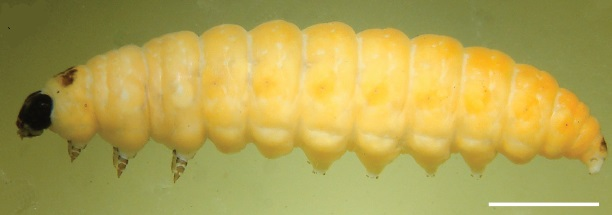
Last instar larva

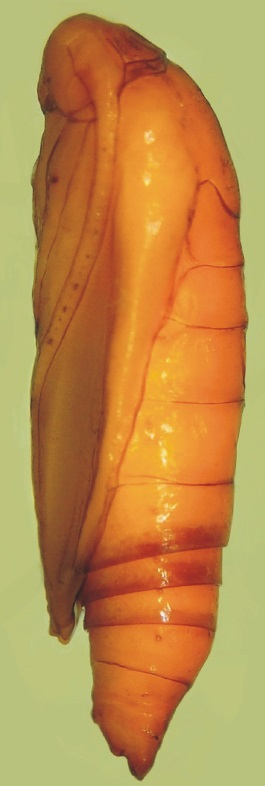
Pupa

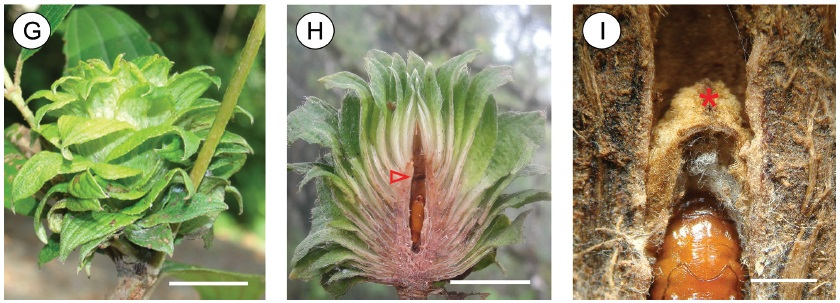
Gall on Tibouchina fissinervia; H dissected gall; I internal chamber

== Etymology ==
The species is named in honor of the Jesuit priest Joaquim da Silva Tavares, a Portuguese naturalist and a pioneer in the study and description of Brazilian cecidology.
