= Pammeces lithochroma =

Scientific classification
- Domain: Eukaryota
- Kingdom: Animalia
- Phylum: Arthropoda
- Class: Insecta
- Order: Lepidoptera
- Family: Elachistidae
- Genus: Pammeces
- Species: P. lithochroma

Binomial name
- Pammeces lithochroma Walsingham, 1897

Species of moth

Pammeces lithochroma is a moth of the family Agonoxenidae. It was described by Thomas de Grey, 6th Baron Walsingham, in 1897. It is found in the West Indies.
