= Agonoxena phoenicia =

Scientific classification
- Domain: Eukaryota
- Kingdom: Animalia
- Phylum: Arthropoda
- Class: Insecta
- Order: Lepidoptera
- Family: Elachistidae
- Genus: Agonoxena
- Species: A. phoenicia

Binomial name
- Agonoxena phoenicia Bradley, 1966

Synonyms
- Agonoxena phoenicea

Species of moth

Agonoxena phoenicia is a moth of the family Agonoxenidae. It is found in Australia (Queensland).

The wingspan is about 10 mm. Adults are yellow, with a rust-coloured line along each forewing.

The larvae feed on Archontophoenix alexandrae. They live under the leaves of their host plant in thin silken web.
