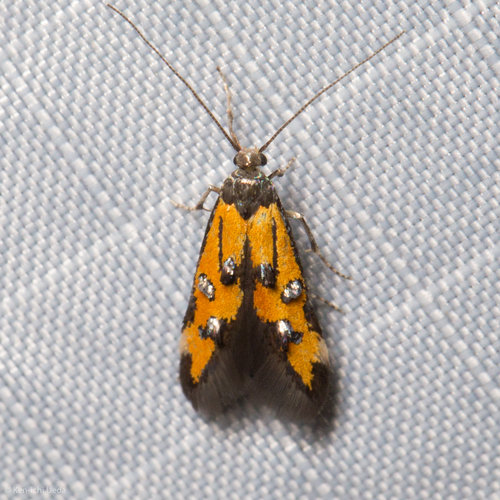

Scientific classification
- Kingdom: Animalia
- Phylum: Arthropoda
- Clade: Pancrustacea
- Class: Insecta
- Order: Lepidoptera
- Family: Elachistidae
- Genus: Chrysoclista
- Species: C. grandis

Binomial name
- Chrysoclista grandis Koster, 2002

= Chrysoclista grandis =

Species of moth

Chrysoclysta grandis is a species of moth of the family Agonoxenidae. It is found in the western United States, in the mountains of California and Colorado.

The wingspan is 15–17 mm for males. Adults have been recorded from late July till late August.

== Etymology ==
The name grandis refers to the large wingspan and the bright appearance.
