= Proterocosma ochronota =

Scientific classification
- Kingdom: Animalia
- Phylum: Arthropoda
- Class: Insecta
- Order: Lepidoptera
- Family: Elachistidae
- Genus: Proterocosma
- Species: P. ochronota

Binomial name
- Proterocosma ochronota Meyrick, 1886

Species of moth

Proterocosma ochronota is a moth of the family Agonoxenidae. It was described by Edward Meyrick in 1886. It is found in Tonga.
