= Agonoxena pyrogramma =

Scientific classification
- Kingdom: Animalia
- Phylum: Arthropoda
- Class: Insecta
- Order: Lepidoptera
- Family: Elachistidae
- Genus: Agonoxena
- Species: A. pyrogramma

Binomial name
- Agonoxena pyrogramma Meyrick, 1924

Species of moth

Agonoxena pyrogramma is a moth of the family Agonoxenidae. It is found on the Solomon Islands.
