= Pammeces citraula =

Scientific classification
- Kingdom: Animalia
- Phylum: Arthropoda
- Class: Insecta
- Order: Lepidoptera
- Family: Elachistidae
- Genus: Pammeces
- Species: P. citraula

Binomial name
- Pammeces citraula Meyrick, 1922

Species of moth

Pammeces citraula is a moth of the family Agonoxenidae. It was described by Edward Meyrick in 1922. It is found in Peru.
