= Agonoxena miniana =

Scientific classification
- Kingdom: Animalia
- Phylum: Arthropoda
- Class: Insecta
- Order: Lepidoptera
- Family: Elachistidae
- Genus: Agonoxena
- Species: A. miniana

Binomial name
- Agonoxena miniana (Meyrick, 1926)

Synonyms
- Haemolytis miniana Meyrick, 1926

Species of moth

Agonoxena miniana is a moth of the family Agonoxenidae. It is found on Java.

The wingspan is 12–14 mm. The forewings are pale ochreous with elongate marks of dark grey suffusion on the costa near the base and beyond the middle, the first sometimes extended to the base, sometimes some grey irroration beneath the costa between and beyond these. Other markings are crimson-red. There is a short mark from the base of the costa, some suffusion towards the base of the dorsum, a short longitudinal streak in the disc before the middle, another towards the costa beyond the middle, a streak along the fold from near the base to its extremity, a spot on the termen beyond this, some irroration towards the apex, and a spot at the apex. The hindwings are ochreous-whitish.
