= Chrysoclista villella =

Scientific classification
- Domain: Eukaryota
- Kingdom: Animalia
- Phylum: Arthropoda
- Class: Insecta
- Order: Lepidoptera
- Family: Elachistidae
- Genus: Chrysoclista
- Species: C. villella

Binomial name
- Chrysoclista villella (Busck, 1904)

Synonyms
- Cosmopteryx villella Busck, 1904

Species of moth

Chrysoclista villella is a species of moth of the family Agonoxenidae. It is found in the United States (Washington) and Canada (British Columbia).

The wingspan is about 10 mm for both males and females.
