= Palaeomystella oligophaga =

Scientific classification
- Kingdom: Animalia
- Phylum: Arthropoda
- Clade: Pancrustacea
- Class: Insecta
- Order: Lepidoptera
- Family: Elachistidae
- Genus: Palaeomystella
- Species: P. oligophaga

Binomial name
- Palaeomystella oligophaga Becker & Adamski, 2008

Species of moth

Palaeomystella oligophaga is a moth of the family Agonoxenidae. It is found in Brazil.

The length of the forewings is 7.7-10.1 mm.
