= Augasma nidifica =

Scientific classification
- Domain: Eukaryota
- Kingdom: Animalia
- Phylum: Arthropoda
- Class: Insecta
- Order: Lepidoptera
- Family: Coleophoridae
- Genus: Augasma
- Species: A. nidifica

Binomial name
- Augasma nidifica Meyrick, 1912

Species of moth

Augasma nidifica is a moth of the family Coleophoridae. It was described by Edward Meyrick in 1912. It is found in South Africa.

The wingspan is about 13 mm. Both the forewings and hindwings are whitish-ochreous.

The species has been bred from an ovate woody gall on a twig of an unnamed shrub.
