= Goniodoma auroguttella =

Scientific classification
- Kingdom: Animalia
- Phylum: Arthropoda
- Clade: Pancrustacea
- Class: Insecta
- Order: Lepidoptera
- Family: Coleophoridae
- Genus: Goniodoma
- Species: G. auroguttella

Binomial name
- Goniodoma auroguttella Zeller, 1849

Species of moth

Goniodoma auroguttella is a moth of the family Coleophoridae. It is found in southern Europe, European Russia and Asia Minor. The habitat consists of steppe and semi-desert biotopes.

Adults are on wing from June to August.

The first instar larva live in the carpels of Atriplex species, including Atriplex patula, Atriplex latifolia, Atriplex laciniata and Atriplex tatarica.
