= Chrysoclista basiflavella =

Scientific classification
- Kingdom: Animalia
- Phylum: Arthropoda
- Clade: Pancrustacea
- Class: Insecta
- Order: Lepidoptera
- Family: Elachistidae
- Genus: Chrysoclista
- Species: C. basiflavella

Binomial name
- Chrysoclista basiflavella Matsumura, 1931

Species of moth

Chrysoclista basiflavella is a moth of the family Agonoxenidae. It was described by Shōnen Matsumura in 1931. It is found in Japan.
