= Chrysoclista trilychna =

Scientific classification
- Kingdom: Animalia
- Phylum: Arthropoda
- Class: Insecta
- Order: Lepidoptera
- Family: Elachistidae
- Genus: Chrysoclista
- Species: C. trilychna

Binomial name
- Chrysoclista trilychna Meyrick, 1928

Species of moth

Chrysoclista trilychna is a moth of the family Agonoxenidae. It was described by Edward Meyrick in 1928. It is found in India (Madras).
