= Proterocosma marginata =

Scientific classification
- Kingdom: Animalia
- Phylum: Arthropoda
- Class: Insecta
- Order: Lepidoptera
- Family: Elachistidae
- Genus: Proterocosma
- Species: P. marginata

Binomial name
- Proterocosma marginata Diakonoff, 1954

Species of moth

Proterocosma marginata is a moth of the family Agonoxenidae. It was described by Alexey Diakonoff in 1954. It is found in New Guinea.
