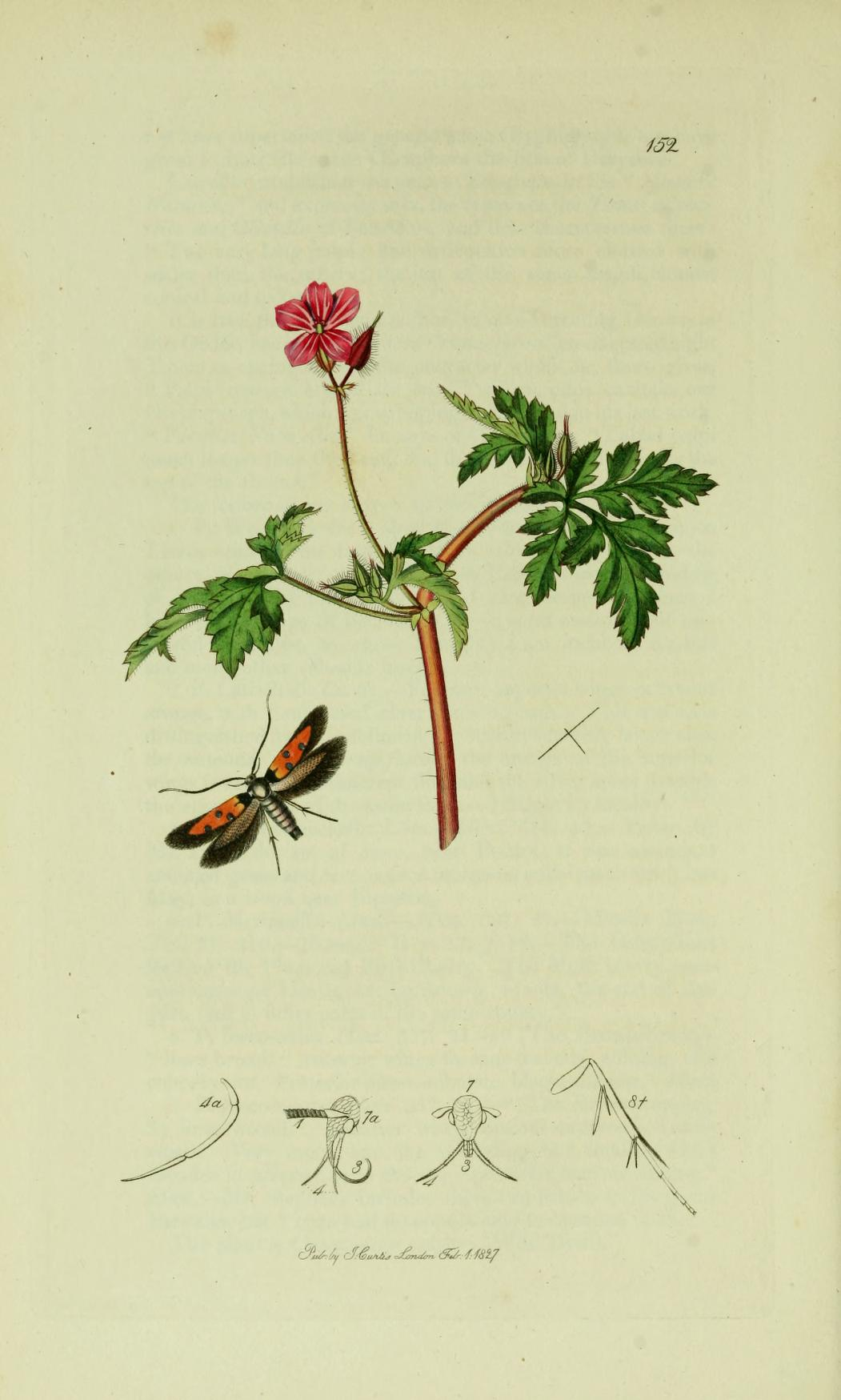
- Illustration of the moth Chrysoclista linneella and the Herb-Robert Geranium robertianum.

Scientific classification
- Kingdom: Animalia
- Phylum: Arthropoda
- Clade: Pancrustacea
- Class: Insecta
- Order: Lepidoptera
- Family: Elachistidae
- Subfamily: Agonoxeninae
- Genus: Chrysoclista; Stainton, 1854

Synonyms
- Glyphipteryx auctt. nec J. Curtis, 1827

= Chrysoclista =

Genus of moths

Chrysoclista is a genus of moths of the family Agonoxenidae described by Henry Tibbats Stainton in 1854.

== Taxonomy ==
The genus is mostly placed in the family Agonoxenidae, but other authors list it as a member of the families Elachistidae, Cosmopterigidae or Momphidae.

== Species ==
- Chrysoclista abchasica (Sinev, 1986)
- Chrysoclista basiflavella Matsumura, 1931
- Chrysoclista cambiella (Busck, 1915)
- Chrysoclista grandis Koster, 2002
- Chrysoclista hygrophilella Viette, 1957
- Chrysoclista lathamella T. B. Fletcher, 1936
- Chrysoclista linneella (Clerck, 1759)
- Chrysoclista monotyla Meyrick, 1921
- Chrysoclista splendida Karsholt, 1997
- Chrysoclista thrypsiphila Meyrick, 1912
- Chrysoclista trilychna Meyrick, 1928
- Chrysoclista villella (Busck, 1904)
- Chrysoclista zagulajevi Sinev, 1979
