= Diacholotis iopyrrha =

Scientific classification
- Kingdom: Animalia
- Phylum: Arthropoda
- Class: Insecta
- Order: Lepidoptera
- Family: Agonoxenidae (disputed)
- Genus: Diacholotis Meyrick, 1937
- Species: D. iopyrrha

Binomial name
- Diacholotis iopyrrha Meyrick, 1937

Species of moth

Diacholotis iopyrrha is a moth of the family Agonoxenidae. It is found in Costa Rica.
