= Panclintis =

Scientific classification
- Kingdom: Animalia
- Phylum: Arthropoda
- Clade: Pancrustacea
- Class: Insecta
- Order: Lepidoptera
- Family: Elachistidae
- Genus: Panclintis; Meyrick, 1929
- Species: P. socia

Binomial name
- Panclintis socia Meyrick, 1929

Species of moth

Panclintis socia is a moth of the family Agonoxenidae, and is the only species of the genus Panclintis. It is found in Colombia.
