= Chrysoclista abchasica =

Scientific classification
- Kingdom: Animalia
- Phylum: Arthropoda
- Clade: Pancrustacea
- Class: Insecta
- Order: Lepidoptera
- Family: Elachistidae
- Genus: Chrysoclista
- Species: C. abchasica

Binomial name
- Chrysoclista abchasica (Sinev, 1986)

Synonyms
- Glyphipteryx abchasica Sinev, 1986

Species of moth

Chrysoclista abchasica is a species of moth of the family Agonoxenidae. It is found in the Czech Republic, Georgia and Abkhazia (Transcaucasia).

The wingspan is about 9 mm. Adults have been recorded on wing at the beginning of July.

== Subspecies ==
- Chrysoclista abchasica abchasica
- Chrysoclista abchasica gabretica Šumpich, 2012 (Czech Republic)
