= Nanodacna =

Scientific classification
- Kingdom: Animalia
- Phylum: Arthropoda
- Class: Insecta
- Order: Lepidoptera
- Family: Elachistidae
- Subfamily: Agonoxeninae
- Genus: Nanodacna; Clarke, 1964

Genus of moths

Nanodacna is a genus of moths in the family Elachistidae.

== Species ==
The following species are assigned to this genus:

- Nanodacna ancora Clarke, 1964
- Nanodacna indiscriminata Clarke, 1965
- Nanodacna logistica (Meyrick, 1931)
- Nanodacna vinacea (Meyrick, 1922)

Additionally, Insect.pro lists an additional species:

- Nanodacna austrocedrella Landry & Adamski, 2004
