= Nicanthes =

Scientific classification
- Kingdom: Animalia
- Phylum: Arthropoda
- Clade: Pancrustacea
- Class: Insecta
- Order: Lepidoptera
- Family: Elachistidae
- Subfamily: Agonoxeninae
- Genus: Nicanthes; Meyrick, 1928
- Species: N. rhodoclea

Binomial name
- Nicanthes rhodoclea Meyrick, 1928

Species of moth

Nicanthes rhodoclea is a moth of the family Elachistidae and the only species in the genus Nicanthes. It is found in Guyana and Puerto Rico.
