= Chrysoclista zagulajevi =

Scientific classification
- Kingdom: Animalia
- Phylum: Arthropoda
- Clade: Pancrustacea
- Class: Insecta
- Order: Lepidoptera
- Family: Elachistidae
- Genus: Chrysoclista
- Species: C. zagulajevi

Binomial name
- Chrysoclista zagulajevi Sinev, 1979

Species of moth

Chrysoclista zagulajevi is a species of moth of the family Agonoxenidae. It is found in Georgia and Adjara (Transcaucasia).

The wingspan is about 10 mm. Adults have been recorded on wing in July.
