= Helcanthica =

Scientific classification
- Kingdom: Animalia
- Phylum: Arthropoda
- Class: Insecta
- Order: Lepidoptera
- Family: Agonoxenidae (disputed)
- Genus: Helcanthica Meyrick, 1932
- Species: H. spermotoca

Binomial name
- Helcanthica spermotoca Meyrick, 1932

Genus of moths

Helcanthica spermotoca is a moth of the family Agonoxenidae. It is found on the Virgin Islands.
