= Gnamptonoma =

Scientific classification
- Kingdom: Animalia
- Phylum: Arthropoda
- Class: Insecta
- Order: Lepidoptera
- Family: Elachistidae
- Subfamily: Agonoxeninae
- Genus: Gnamptonoma; Meyrick, 1917
- Species: G. leptura

Binomial name
- Gnamptonoma leptura Meyrick, 1917

Species of moth

Gnamptonoma leptura is a moth of the family Agonoxenidae and the only species in the genus Gnamptonoma. It is only known from its types from Ecuador.

It has a wingspan of 8mm. Its forewings are dark bronzy fuscous, with a whitish-ochreous dorsal streak from base occupying nearly half of wing, sprinkeled with blackish specks on costa.
