= Nanodacna vinacea =

Scientific classification
- Kingdom: Animalia
- Phylum: Arthropoda
- Class: Insecta
- Order: Lepidoptera
- Family: Elachistidae
- Genus: Nanodacna
- Species: N. vinacea

Binomial name
- Nanodacna vinacea (Meyrick, 1922)

Synonyms
- Homaledra vinacea Meyrick, 1922

Species of moth

Nanodacna vinacea is a moth of the family Elachistidae. It is found in Peru.
