= Glaucacna =

Scientific classification
- Kingdom: Animalia
- Phylum: Arthropoda
- Clade: Pancrustacea
- Class: Insecta
- Order: Lepidoptera
- Family: Elachistidae
- Subfamily: Agonoxeninae
- Genus: Glaucacna; Forbes, 1931
- Species: G. iridea

Binomial name
- Glaucacna iridea Forbes, 1931

Synonyms
- Glaucagna Gaede, 1937 (incorrect subsequent spelling)

Genus of moths

Glaucacna is a monotypic moth genus in the family Agonoxenidae which was described by William Trowbridge Merrifield Forbes in 1931. Its only species, Glaucacna iridea, described in the same article, is found in Puerto Rico.
