= Iriothyrsa =

Scientific classification
- Kingdom: Animalia
- Phylum: Arthropoda
- Clade: Pancrustacea
- Class: Insecta
- Order: Lepidoptera
- Family: Coleophoridae
- Genus: Iriothyrsa; Meyrick, 1908
- Species: I. melanogma

Binomial name
- Iriothyrsa melanogma Meyrick, 1908

Synonyms
- Ischnopsis melanogma (Meyrick, 1908)

Genus of moths

Iriothyrsa is a genus of moths, belonging to the family Coleophoridae containing only one species, Iriothyrsa melanogma, which is known from South Africa.
