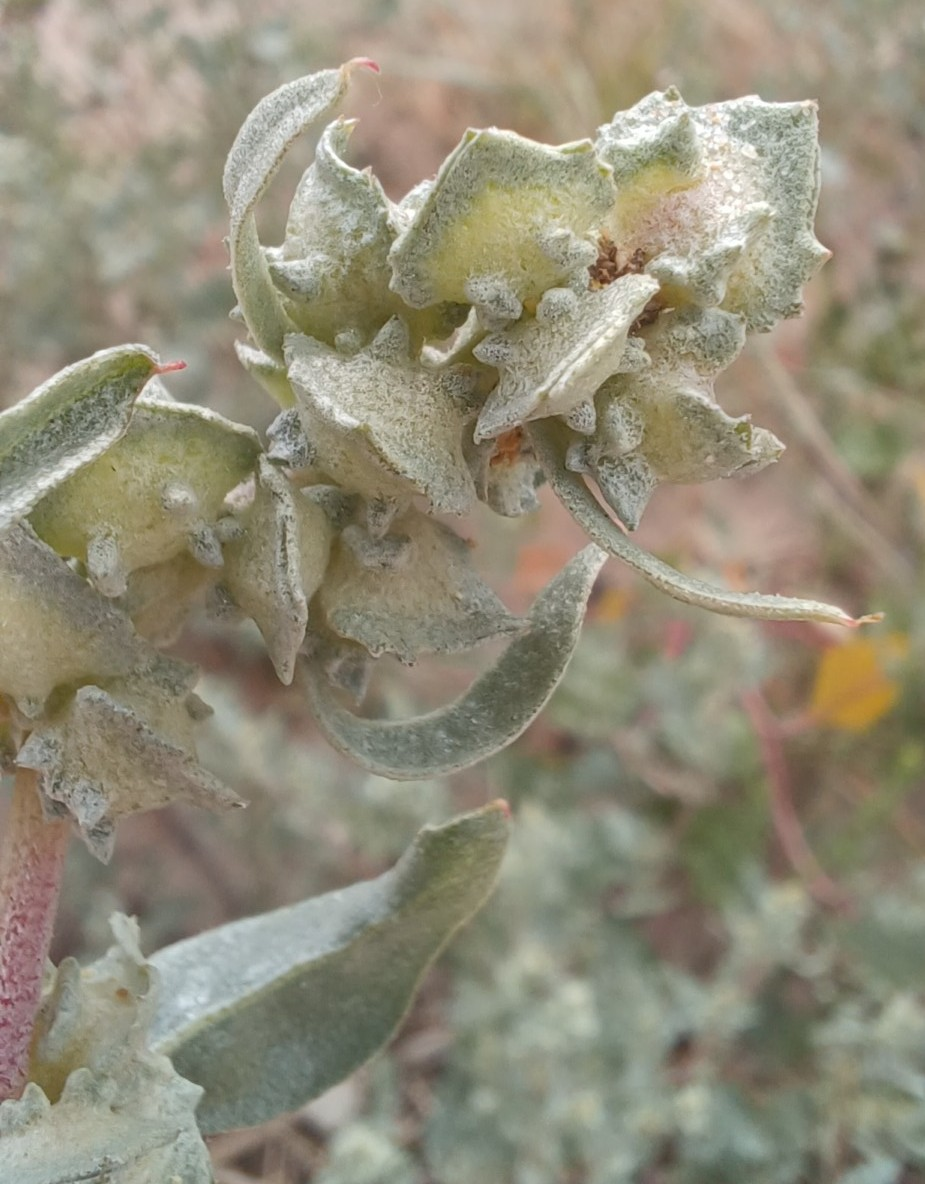

Scientific classification
- Kingdom: Plantae
- Clade: Embryophytes
- Clade: Tracheophytes
- Clade: Spermatophytes
- Clade: Angiosperms
- Clade: Eudicots
- Order: Caryophyllales
- Family: Amaranthaceae
- Genus: Atriplex
- Species: A. laciniata

Binomial name
- Atriplex laciniata L.

Synonyms
- List: Chenopodium laciniatum (L.) Thunb.; Obione laciniata (L.) G.L. Chu; Schizotheca laciniata (L.) Fourr.; Atriplex abbreviata Opiz; Atriplex albicans Willd.; Atriplex arenaria J. Woods; Atriplex astracanica Balb.; Atriplex astrachanica Ledeb.; Atriplex bocconii Guss.; Atriplex farinosa Dumort.; Atriplex incisa Ledeb.; Atriplex laciniata var. truncata Gray; Atriplex maritima L.; Atriplex microphylla Schur; Atriplex nivea Merino; Atriplex pruinosa Sieber ex Moq.; Atriplex sabulosa Rouy; Atriplex sinuata (Thunb.) Aellen; Atriplex sinuata Hoffm.; Atriplex thunbergiana Schult.; Atriplex tornabenei var. nivea (Merino) Merino; Chenopodium pinnatum Moq.; Chenopodium sinuatum Thunb.; Obione sabulosa (Rouy) G.L. Chu

= Atriplex laciniata =

Species of flowering plant

Atriplex laciniata, generally known as frosted orache, is a silvery-white sprawling plant that occurs on sandy beaches, mainly along the western coasts of Europe, and (much more sparsely) in the Mediterranean. It has been introduced to North America, probably with ballast on ships, but it remains very rare. It is a characteristic annual plant of strandline vegetation at the top of beaches and one of the earliest colonisers of bare sand.

== Description ==
Frosted orache is a monoecious annual herb that grows to about 30 cm tall with decumbent to ascending stems that sprawl across sandy or sand and shingle beaches. It has a short taproot and many fibrous side-roots that also spread widely. The stems are generally red, densely covered with white, mealy hairs, and frequently branched.

The leaves are alternate. The lower ones are broadly rhombic in outline, about 4 cm long, with a cuneate base, at least 2 large lobes, and often several broad teeth around the margin. The upper leaves become progressively narrower until the ones within the inflorescence are almost linear. All the leaves have only a short petiole, about 0.5 cm long. The leaves are silvery-grey in colour and scaly or mealy, especially below.

Flowering occurs in late summer. The inflorescence is a panicle of short spikes of dense silvery-white glomerules, or clusters of 2–4 tiny, petal-less flowers. Flowers are of two types. The male ones are about 1 mm across, with 4 or 5 tiny tepals and 4 or 5 stamens. The females consist of an ovary with a short style and two stigmas, situated between two bracteoles that enlarge at maturity to about 10 mm long. They are broadly triangular with a deeply toothed margin and often a warty surface, green turning black in colour, but with a silvery-grey mealy coat, and fused at least half way to the tip.

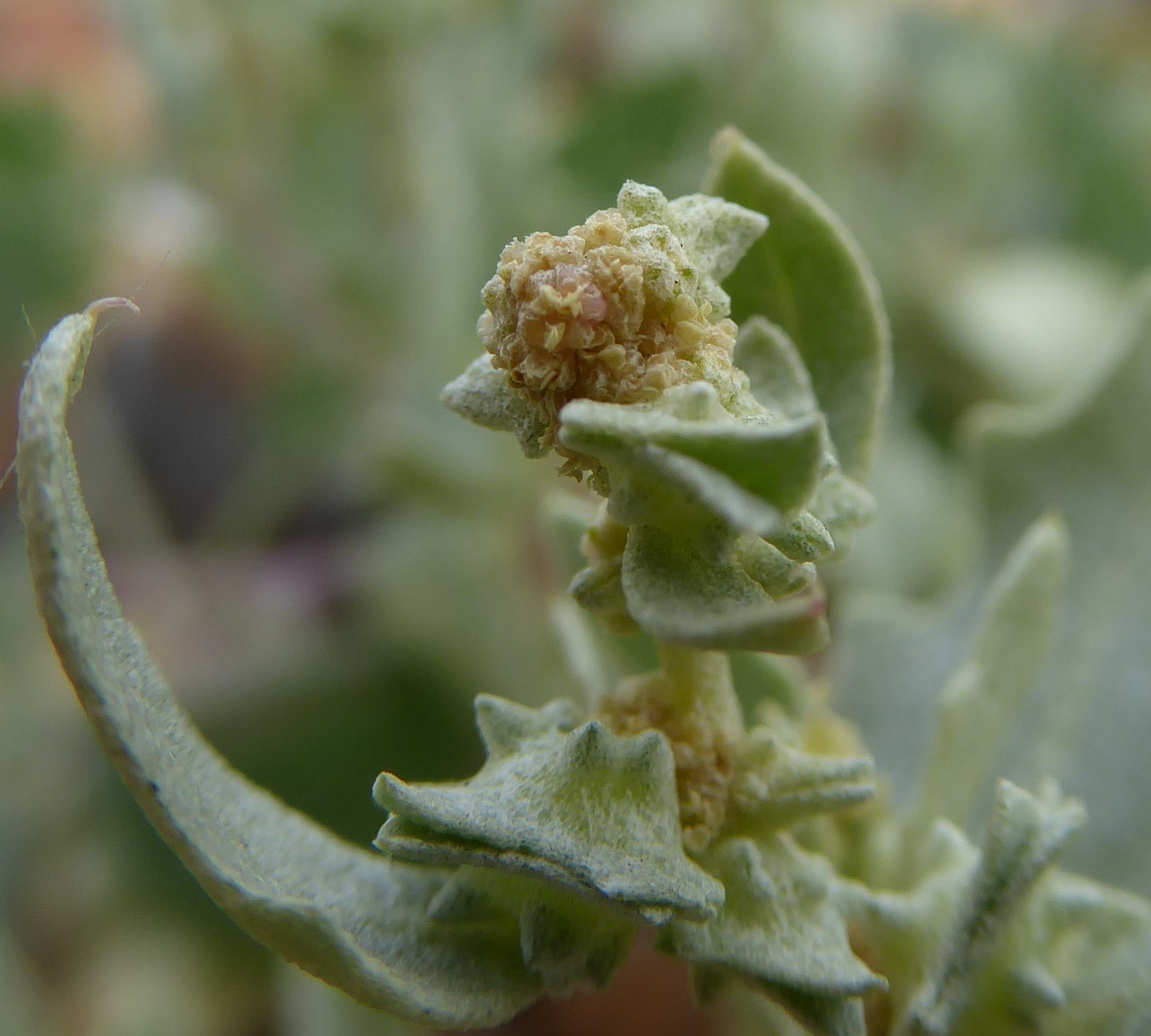
Inflorescence

The fruit ripens to a brown, round seed (achene) about 5 mm in diameter and slightly flattened to a disc shape. The radicle (incipient root) points upwards within the bracteoles.

== Taxonomy ==
The name Atriplex laciniata was coined by Carl Linnaeus in Species Plantarum in 1753, although he only modified it slightly from the polynomial given in Bauhin's Pinax theatri botanici of 1623, which was Atriplex maritima laciniata.

The genus name Atriplex is derived from ἀδράφαξυς (adráphaxus), which was used by Pliny for a different species of orach, Atriplex rosea, although the name predates its Ancient Greek usage. The specific epithet laciniata is from the Latin word lacinia, which describes a flap in a garment, and in botany is used to describe a lobed or deeply-incised leaf margin.

Its chromosome number is 2n = 18.

== Distribution and status ==
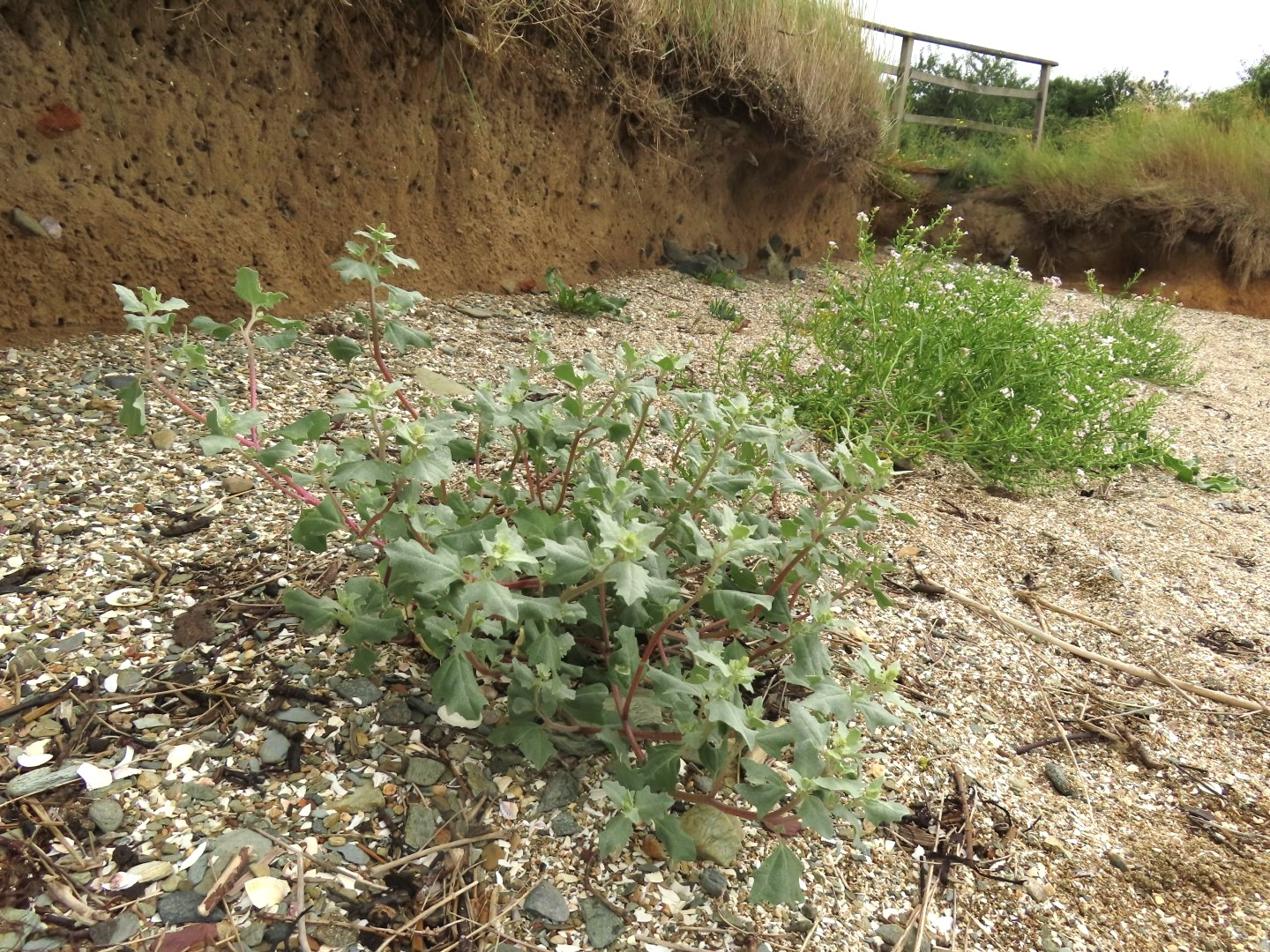
Frosted orache and sea rocket in strandline vegetation near Saint Brieuc, Brittany

Frosted orache is quite a rare plant, globally, being largely restricted to the Atlantic coasts of western Europe - mainly around Britain and Ireland, from northern Spain to Denmark and Sweden. In Norway it is mainly on some southern beaches, and there are small outlying populations on the Mediterranean coasts of Spain, France and Corsica.

It is scattered or common around the entire coastline of Britain and Ireland, including Shetland and Orkney, and the Channel Isles, and has seemingly been increasing in recent decades, especially around Ireland. Despite this, it is generally described as occurring in small, often transient populations. There is no evidence of it spreading successfully onto salt-treated roadsides, although many other coastal species do so.

There has been much confusion about its occurrence in North America owing to its similarity to Atriplex canescens. Early sightings from Virginia were errors of identification, although Linnaeus himself listed it as an American plant, in Species Plantarum. Some sources still list it as an introduction over quite a wide area from New York state to Newfoundland, while others report that it is at best very rare. The best evidence for it is from quite a short length of the Canadian coast from Nova Scotia to New Brunswick, where it certainly seems to have been photographed on Prince Edward Island, Canada.

It is not considered to be at any risk of extinction, although it has not been assessed for threat status globally. In Britain and France, where it is most abundant, it is classified as LC (Least Concern).

In Britain and Ireland it is considered an axiophyte in all counties with a coastline. This means it should be taken into account in designating sites for conservation, such as nature reserves, and can be used in monitoring.

== Habitat and ecology ==
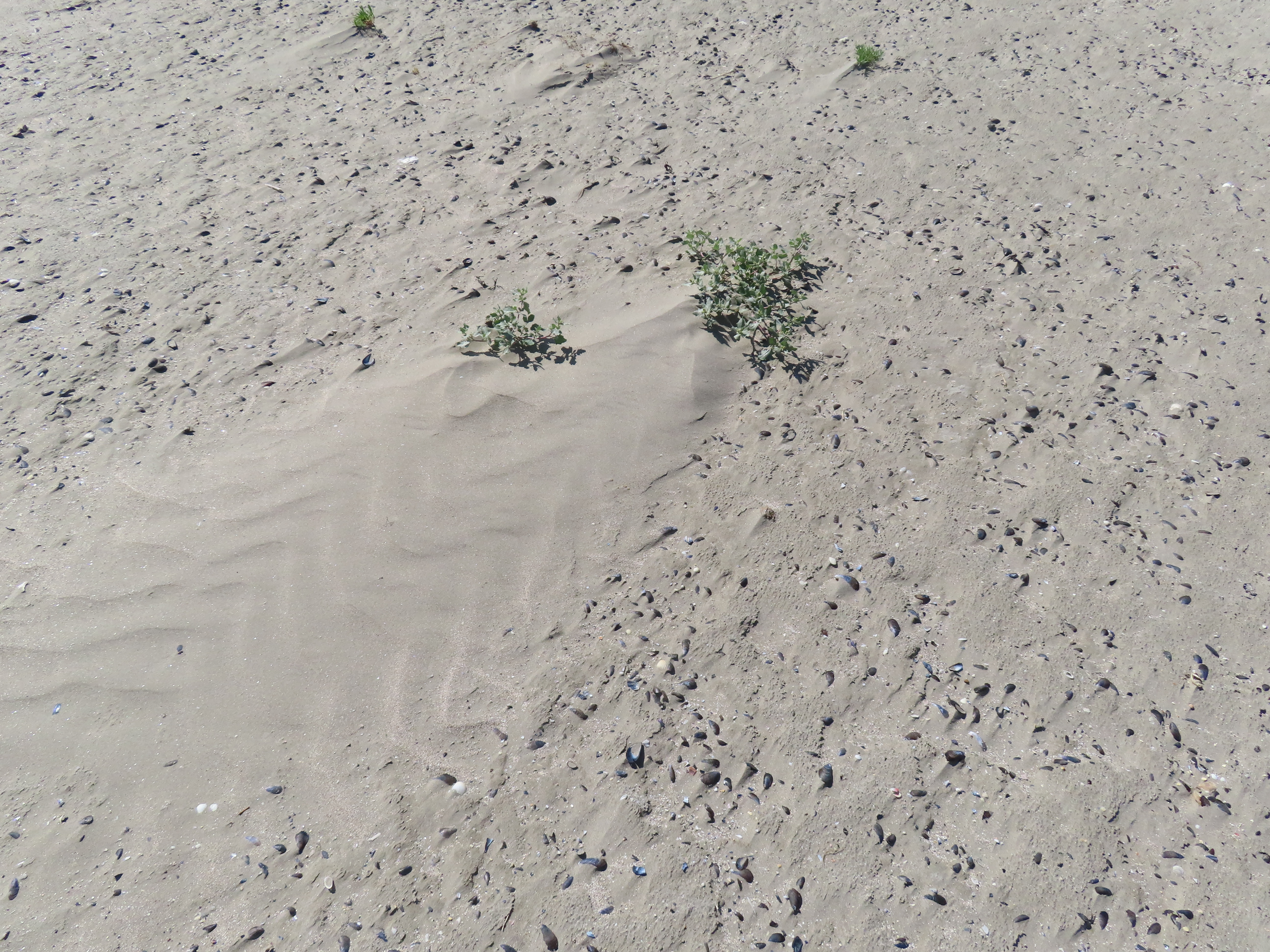
It is one of the pioneer plants on a sandy beach, and can be involved in embryonic dune formation.

The habitat of this species is on sandy beaches, between the mean spring high tide line and the equinoctial high tide line. Each year this strandline vegetation, which is classified as habitat 1210 in the EUNIS habitat classification system, is destroyed by exceptional tides with a coefficient of 100–120. In Britain, this is the SD2 Honkenya peploides-Cakile maritima strandline community, or sometimes (on sand and shingle beaches) SD1 Rumex crispus-Glaucium flavum vegetation.

Frosted orache is therefore adapted to complete its life cycle during the summer months and to tolerate salty water at a shallow depth. Some accounts used to suggest that the fertility of beaches like these is particularly high, due to rotting seaweed mixed into the sand, but more recent studies show that while this might be true in some circumstances, a sandy beach is usually very nutrient poor.

Frosted orache is primarily wind-pollinated but can be self-pollinating.

In Britain there are only two (possibly three) species of insect known to produce galls on frosted orache. Hayhurstia atriplicis is an aphid that infests the leaves, causing swelling and curling of the leaf blade; Trioza chenopodii is a bug whose nymphs roll the leaves without causing causing any thickening; and Stefaniella brevipalpis (which still requires confirmation as a British species) is a midge which inhabits the stems.

There are several more parasites in Europe. The goosefoot pug, Eupithecia sinuosaria, is an Asian species that has spread westwards in recent years. Its larvae feed on the flowers of frosted orache. Another such moth is Goniodoma auroguttella, whose larvae make a case of the bracteoles and feed on the developing fruit before migrating to the base of the plant to pupate within the stem and emerge in spring. This species only occurs in the Mediterranean populations, where the narrow tidal range allows more plants to overwinter. Finally, there is a micromoth called Scrobipalpa atriplicella, the goosefoot groundling, the larvae of which create leaf mines in this and other species of Amaranthaceae.
