= Pammeces =

Scientific classification
- Kingdom: Animalia
- Phylum: Arthropoda
- Clade: Pancrustacea
- Class: Insecta
- Order: Lepidoptera
- Family: Elachistidae
- Subfamily: Agonoxeninae
- Genus: Pammeces; Zeller, 1863

Synonyms
- Psammeces Walker, 1866

Genus of moths

Pammeces is a genus of moths in the family Agonoxenidae. It was formerly included in the Cosmopterigidae.

== Species ==
- Pammeces albivittella Zeller, 1863
- Pammeces citraula Meyrick, 1922
- Pammeces crocoxysta Meyrick, 1922
- Pammeces lithochroma Walsingham, 1897
- Pammeces pallida Walsingham, 1897
- Pammeces phlogophora Walsingham, 1909
- Pammeces picticornis (Walsingham, 1897)
- Pammeces problema Walsingham, 1915
