= Nanodacna indiscriminata =

Scientific classification
- Kingdom: Animalia
- Phylum: Arthropoda
- Class: Insecta
- Order: Lepidoptera
- Family: Elachistidae
- Genus: Nanodacna
- Species: N. indiscriminata

Binomial name
- Nanodacna indiscriminata Clarke, 1965

Species of moth

Nanodacna indiscriminata is a moth of the family Elachistidae. It is found on the Juan Fernández Islands.
