= Nanodacna ancora =

Scientific classification
- Kingdom: Animalia
- Phylum: Arthropoda
- Class: Insecta
- Order: Lepidoptera
- Family: Elachistidae
- Genus: Nanodacna
- Species: N. ancora

Binomial name
- Nanodacna ancora Clarke, 1964

Species of moth

Nanodacna ancora is a moth. It belongs to the family Elachistidae. It is found on the Juan Fernández Islands.
