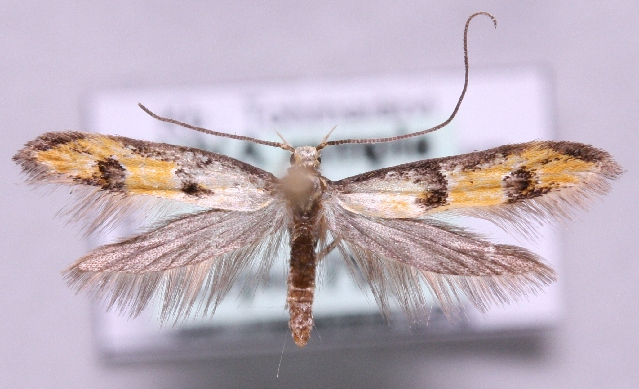
- Heinemannia laspeyrella

Scientific classification
- Kingdom: Animalia
- Phylum: Arthropoda
- Class: Insecta
- Order: Lepidoptera
- Family: Elachistidae
- Subfamily: Agonoxeninae
- Genus: Heinemannia; Wocke, 1876

Synonyms
- Tebenna Hübner, 1825

= Heinemannia =

Genus of moths

Heinemannia is a genus of moths of the family Elachistidae.

== Distribution ==
Heinemannia species are found in the Palearctic realm, east up to south-western Siberia.

== Taxonomy ==
The genus is mostly placed in the family Elachistidae, but other authors list it as a member of the family Agonoxenidae when that family is not treated as a subfamily of Elachistidae.

== Selected species ==
- Heinemannia albidorsella (Staudinger, 1877)
- Heinemannia festivella (Denis & Schiffermüller, 1775)
- Heinemannia laspeyrella (Hübner, 1796)
