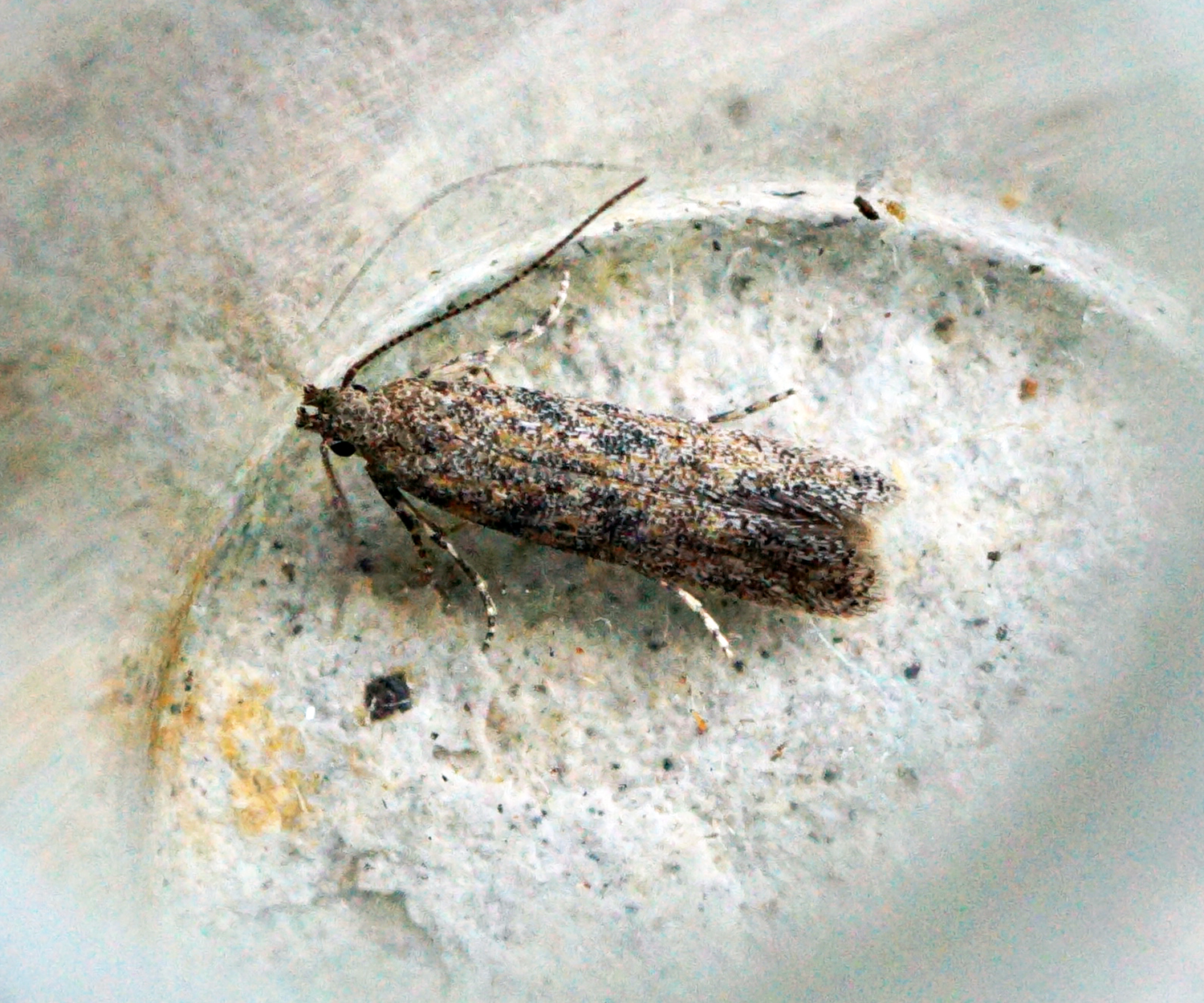

Scientific classification
- Domain: Eukaryota
- Kingdom: Animalia
- Phylum: Arthropoda
- Class: Insecta
- Order: Lepidoptera
- Family: Gelechiidae
- Genus: Scrobipalpa
- Species: S. atriplicella

Binomial name
- Scrobipalpa atriplicella (Fischer v. Röslerstamm, 1841)

Synonyms
- Lita atriplicella Fischer v. Röslerstamm, 1841; Gnorimoschema atriplicellum; Gnorimoschema chenopodiella Busck, 1916; Tinea atrella Thunberg, 1788; Lita atriplicella var. infumatella Fuchs, 1901; Scrobipalpa (Euscrobipalpa) arogantella Povolný, 1967; Scrobipalpa altajica Povolný, 1969

= Scrobipalpa atriplicella =

Species of moth

Scrobipalpa atriplicella, the goosefoot groundling moth, is a moth of the family Gelechiidae. It is found from most of Europe throughout Asia to Kamchatka and Japan. It is an introduced species in North America.

The wingspan is 10–14 mm. Terminal joint of palpi as long as second. Forewings are dark fuscous, whitish-sprinkled, mixed or somewhat streaked longitudinally with pale ochreous, dorsal area lighter; a dark spot on costa at 1/4; stigmata blackish, ill-defined, first discal rather beyond plical; indistinct blackish spots on fold before and beyond plical, and in angle of a faint pale fascia at 3/4. Hindwings 1, light grey, darker terminally. The larva is greenish yellow or green; dorsal line rosy -suffused; head yellowish.

There are two generations per year with adults on wing in May and again from July to August.

The larvae feed on Atriplex laciniata, Atriplex patula, Atriplex prostrata, Atriplex tatarica, Beta vulgaris, Chenopodium album, Chenopodium ficifolium, Chenopodium hybridum, Chenopodium murale, Chenopodium quinoa and Halimione portulacoides. The young larvae mine the leaves of their host plant. They can be found in June and from September to October.
