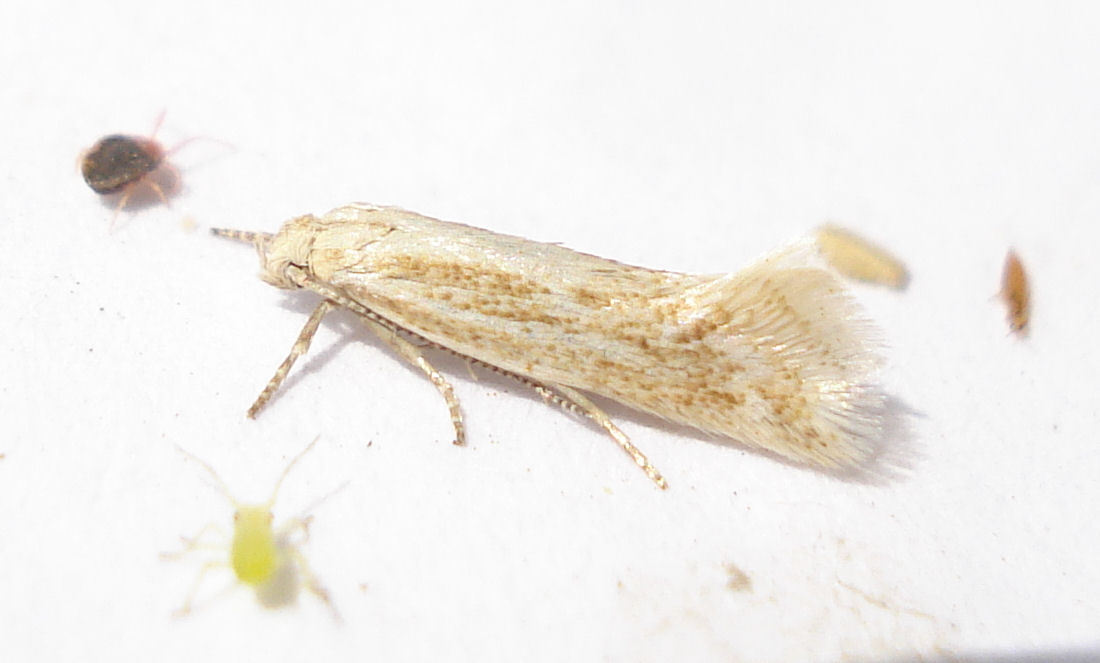

Scientific classification
- Kingdom: Animalia
- Phylum: Arthropoda
- Clade: Pancrustacea
- Class: Insecta
- Order: Lepidoptera
- Family: Coleophoridae
- Genus: Amblyxena; Meyrick, 1914

= Amblyxena =

Genus of moths

Amblyxena is a genus of moths belonging to the family Coleophoridae. The genus was erected by Edward Meyrick in 1914.

== Species ==
- Amblyxena enopias Meyrick, 1914
- Amblyxena pilifera Meyrick, 1921
