= Nasamonica =

Scientific classification
- Kingdom: Animalia
- Phylum: Arthropoda
- Clade: Pancrustacea
- Class: Insecta
- Order: Lepidoptera
- Family: Coleophoridae
- Genus: Nasamonica; Meyrick, 1922
- Species: N. oxymorpha

Binomial name
- Nasamonica oxymorpha Meyrick, 1922

Genus of moths

Nasamonica is a genus of moths, belonging to the family Coleophoridae or Momphidae. It contains only one species, Nasamonica oxymorpha, which is found in Chad.
