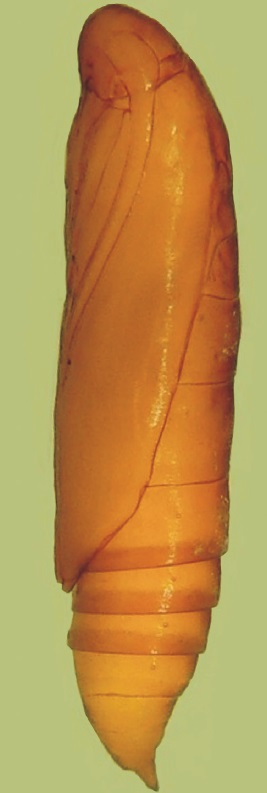
- Palaeomystella rosaemariae pupa

Scientific classification
- Kingdom: Animalia
- Phylum: Arthropoda
- Class: Insecta
- Order: Lepidoptera
- Family: Elachistidae
- Subfamily: Agonoxeninae
- Genus: Palaeomystella; T.B. Fletcher, 1940

Synonyms
- Palaeomystis Meyrick, 1931 (preocc. Warren, 1894)

= Palaeomystella =

Genus of moths

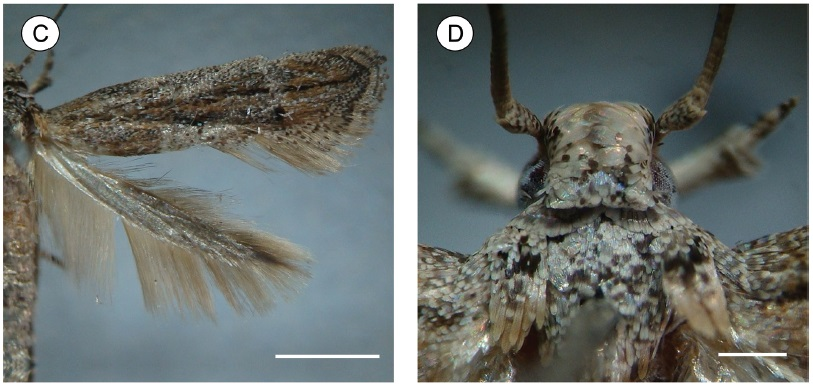
Palaeomystella rosaemariae, head and thorax

Palaeomystella is a genus of moths in the family Momphidae.

== Species ==
- Palaeomystella chalcopeda (Meyrick, 1931)
- Palaeomystella fernandesi Becker & Moreira, 2014
- Palaeomystella henriettiphila Becker & Adamski, 2008
- Palaeomystella oligophaga Becker & Adamski, 2008
- Palaeomystella rosaemariae Becker & Moreira, 2014
- Palaeomystella tavaresi Becker & Moreira, 2014
- Palaeomystella tibouchinae Becker & Adamski, 2008
