= Chrysoclista splendida =

Scientific classification
- Kingdom: Animalia
- Phylum: Arthropoda
- Clade: Pancrustacea
- Class: Insecta
- Order: Lepidoptera
- Family: Elachistidae
- Genus: Chrysoclista
- Species: C. splendida

Binomial name
- Chrysoclista splendida Karsholt, 1997

Species of moth

Chrysoclista splendida is a species of moth of the family Agonoxenidae. It is found in Portugal, France, Germany, Poland, Slovakia, the Czech Republic, Austria, Hungary, Romania, Bulgaria and North Macedonia. There are also records from Sweden.

The wingspan is 14–17 mm. Adults are on wing from the end of May to June.

The larvae feed on Salix species, including Salix alba, Salix purpurea and Salix fragilis.
