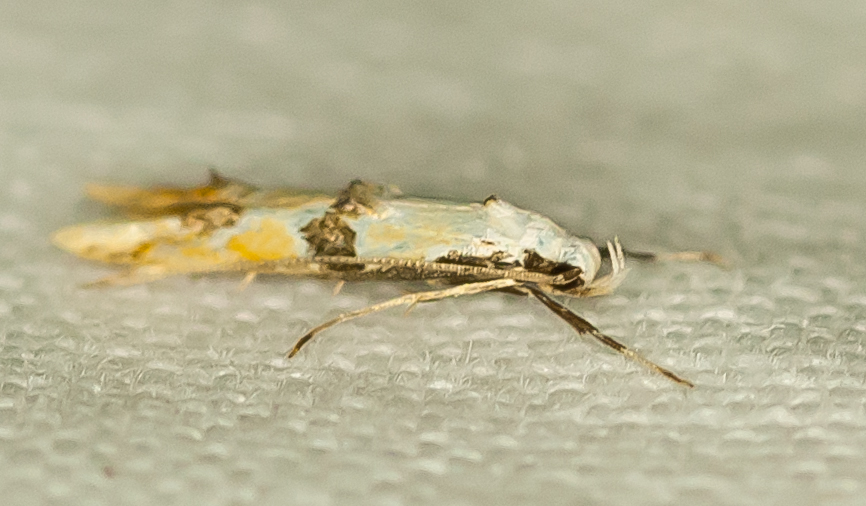

Scientific classification
- Domain: Eukaryota
- Kingdom: Animalia
- Phylum: Arthropoda
- Class: Insecta
- Order: Lepidoptera
- Family: Elachistidae
- Genus: Heinemannia
- Species: H. festivella

Binomial name
- Heinemannia festivella (Denis & Schiffermüller, 1775)

Synonyms
- Phalaena festivella Denis & Schiffermuller, 1775; Tinea festivella; Borkhausenia kokujevi Krulikowsky, 1903

= Heinemannia festivella =

Species of moth

Heinemannia festivella is a species of moth of the family Elachistidae. It is found from Sweden in the north, through central Europe to southern Europe. It is also found in Asia Minor, the Middle East and central Asia.

The wingspan is 14–18 mm. Adults are on wing from May to the first half of August.

The food plant is unknown. There are old records for Solidago virgaurea, but these are disputed. In central Asia, adults have been found on Lonicera species.
