= Heinemannia albidorsella =

Scientific classification
- Domain: Eukaryota
- Kingdom: Animalia
- Phylum: Arthropoda
- Class: Insecta
- Order: Lepidoptera
- Family: Elachistidae
- Genus: Heinemannia
- Species: H. albidorsella

Binomial name
- Heinemannia albidorsella (Staudinger, 1877)

Synonyms
- Laverna albidorsella Staudinger, 1877; Mompha albidecorella Hartig, 1951

Species of moth

Heinemannia albidorsella is a species of moth of the family Elachistidae. It is found in southern France and on Corsica and Sardinia.

The wingspan is 13–16 mm. Adults are on wing from May to the beginning of June.
