= Cladobrostis =

Scientific classification
- Kingdom: Animalia
- Phylum: Arthropoda
- Class: Insecta
- Order: Lepidoptera
- Family: Agonoxenidae (disputed)
- Genus: Cladobrostis Meyrick, 1921
- Species: C. melitricha

Binomial name
- Cladobrostis melitricha Meyrick, 1921

Species of moth

Cladobrostis melitricha is a moth of the family Agonoxenidae. It is found in India. It's the sole species in its genus. One of its food sources is Sindora siamensis.
