= Nanodacna logistica =

Scientific classification
- Kingdom: Animalia
- Phylum: Arthropoda
- Class: Insecta
- Order: Lepidoptera
- Family: Elachistidae
- Genus: Nanodacna
- Species: N. logistica

Binomial name
- Nanodacna logistica (Meyrick, 1931)

Synonyms
- Colonophora logistica Meyrick, 1931

Species of moth

Nanodacna logistica is a moth of the family Elachistidae. It is found in Argentina.
