= Agonoxena =

Scientific classification
- Kingdom: Animalia
- Phylum: Arthropoda
- Class: Insecta
- Order: Lepidoptera
- Family: Elachistidae
- Subfamily: Agonoxeninae
- Genus: Agonoxena; Meyrick, 1921

Synonyms
- Haemolytis Meyrick, 1926

Genus of moths

Agonoxena is a genus of moths of the family Agonoxenidae.

== Species ==
- Agonoxena argaula Meyrick, 1921 (coconut leafminer)
- Agonoxena pyrogramma Meyrick, 1924
- Agonoxena miniana (Meyrick, 1926)
- Agonoxena phoenicea Bradley, 1966
