= Proterocosma =

Scientific classification
- Kingdom: Animalia
- Phylum: Arthropoda
- Class: Insecta
- Order: Lepidoptera
- Family: Elachistidae
- Subfamily: Agonoxeninae
- Genus: Proterocosma; Meyrick, 1886

Genus of moths

Proterocosma is a genus of moths in the family Agonoxenidae. It was formerly included in the Cosmopterigidae.

== Species ==
- Proterocosma dualis Diakonoff, 1954
- Proterocosma epizona Meyrick, 1886
- Proterocosma marginata Diakonoff, 1954
- Proterocosma ochronota Meyrick, 1886
- Proterocosma triplanetis Meyrick, 1886
