= Nanodacna austrocedrella =

Scientific classification
- Kingdom: Animalia
- Phylum: Arthropoda
- Clade: Pancrustacea
- Class: Insecta
- Order: Lepidoptera
- Family: Elachistidae
- Genus: Nanodacna
- Species: N. austrocedrella

Binomial name
- Nanodacna austrocedrella Landry & Adamski, 2004

Species of moth

Nanodacna austrocedrella is a moth of the family Elachistidae. It is found in Argentina.
