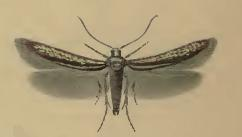
- Augasma aeratella

Scientific classification
- Kingdom: Animalia
- Phylum: Arthropoda
- Clade: Pancrustacea
- Class: Insecta
- Order: Lepidoptera
- Family: Coleophoridae
- Genus: Augasma; Herrich-Schäffer, 1853

= Augasma =

Genus of moths

Augasma is a genus of moth belonging to the family Coleophoridae.

== Species ==
- Augasma aeratella (Zeller, 1839)
- Augasma atraphaxidellum Kuznetzov, 1957
- Augasma nidifica Meyrick, 1912
- Augasma nitens Amsel, 1935
