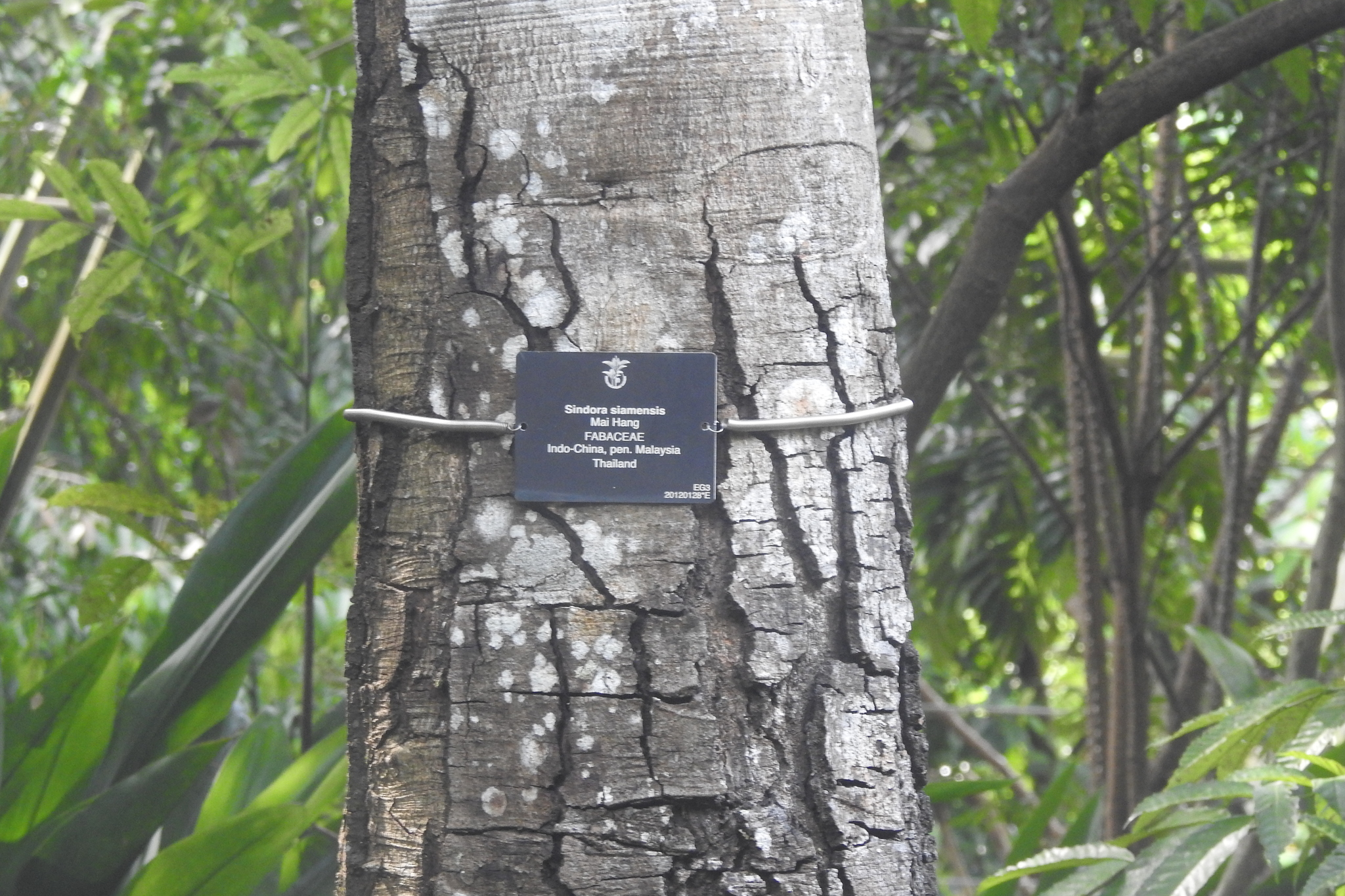

Conservation status
- Least Concern (IUCN 3.1)

Scientific classification
- Kingdom: Plantae
- Clade: Tracheophytes
- Clade: Angiosperms
- Clade: Eudicots
- Clade: Rosids
- Order: Fabales
- Family: Fabaceae
- Genus: Sindora
- Species: S. siamensis

Binomial name
- Sindora siamensis Teijsm. ex Miq., Ann. Mus. Bot. Lugduno-Batavi 3: 86 (1867)

Synonyms
- Galedupa cochinchinensis (Baill.) Prain; G. siamensis (Teijsm.) Prain; Grandiera cochinchinensis Leféb. ex Baill.; Sindora cochinchinensis Baill.; Sindora siamensis var. siamensis; S. wallichii var. siamensis (Teijsm.) Baker

= Sindora siamensis =

Species of legume

Sindora siamensis is a species of tree in the subfamily Detarioideae of the family Fabaceae (also known as the legume family). It has an accepted infraspecific, the variety S. siamensis var. maritima (Pierre) K.Larsen & S.S.Larsen. See taxon box to the right below, and below for details on the variety maritima. The nominate species (i.e. not the variety) is found in many countries in tropical Asia. Like several other species in the genus Sindora, its wood is considered valuable; the least concern conservation status may reflect efforts to replant this species, but mortality rates are high. As well as the wood, the plant provides raw material for chemical products, food and drink, and domestic utensils.

== Description ==
Sindora siamensis is a large evergreen tree. In Cambodia it grows 6-12m tall. The fruit has thorns. The diameter at breast height of trees in forests of Kampong Thom Province, central Cambodia, ranges from 47 to 70 cm, averaging around 58±10 cm.

== Habitat and ecology ==
The tree is found in open semi-deciduous, seasonal tropical forests, including open Dipterocarpus forests and secondary formations in Mainland Southeast Asia.

It is preyed on by the moth Cladobrostis melitricha. In Choam Takong (Khmer: choam = permanently inundated evergreen swamp forest), Stung Treng Province, northeastern Cambodia, S. siamensis is infrequently found growing up to 12m in seasonally inundated and upland (not inundated) areas, under a 30m canopy dominated by Shorea guiso, Myristica iners and Livistona saribus.

== Distribution ==
The plant is found in Peninsular Malaysia, Thailand, Cambodia, Vietnam, Myanmar and Bangladesh. One of its localities in eastern Cambodia is Keo Seima Wildlife Sanctuary. Large specimen trees and examples of replanting can be found in Cát Tiên National Park in Vietnam.

== Conservation ==
While the plant is of Least Concern status in the IUCN RedList, there are ongoing threats of continuing decline in area, extent and/or quality of habitat. Wood extraction is of particular concern. In Kampong Thom Province forests of central Cambodia, concessionary forest managers mainly cut the tree for wood rather than large numbers of illegal wood-cutters.

== Vernacular names ==
- มะค่าแต้, makha-nam, makha-tae, makha-yum (Thai)
- កកោះ kâkâh, kakoh or KorKoh (Khmer)
- korkoh (Kuy and/or Khmer speakers in north-central Cambodia)
- gụ mật, go mat (Vietnamese)
- thai Yunnan (Chinese)

== Uses ==
As well as the wood, which is used for construction, ship-building, furniture-making and carvings, the plant provides raw material for chemical products, food and drink, and domestic utensils. The fruits are edible, and are sometimes chewed in a betel quid in Cambodia. In that country, the wood graded as first (highest) category is especially favoured for floors, beams and columns in construction. The wood scraps and by product makes good charcoal. The bark is used to dye fishing nets.

Amongst Kuy- and Khmer-speaking people living in the same villages in Stung Treng and Preah Vihear provinces of north-central Cambodia, the tree is used as a source of highly-valued timber, medicine and food. The villagers consider large trees of S. siamensis (among others) as possessing a spirit, which should be asked permission if you want to fell the tree. Some people are angry that illegal loggers and clearcutting companies seem not to be harmed, but these people continue to praise, respect and fear the tree-spirits.

== Sindora siamensis var. maritima (Pierre) K.Larsen & S.S.Larsen ==
Variety maritima is a 10-15m tall tree of secondary coastal forests of Southeast Asia. It differs from the nominate species by having thornless fruit. These are also edible. The wood is of bad quality and only used as firewood. Its names in Khmer are kâkâh sbaèk and kâkâh prê:k. Nations where trees of this variety are found are Thailand, Cambodia, Vietnam and Laos.
