= Goniodoma =

Scientific classification
- Kingdom: Animalia
- Phylum: Arthropoda
- Clade: Pancrustacea
- Class: Insecta
- Order: Lepidoptera
- Family: Coleophoridae
- Genus: Goniodoma; Zeller, 1849

Genus of moths

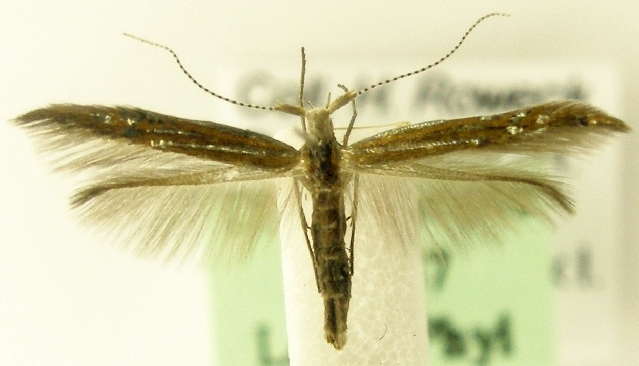
Goniodoma limoniella

Goniodoma is a genus of moths, belonging to the family Coleophoridae.

== Species ==
- Goniodoma auroguttella Zeller, 1849
- Goniodoma limoniella (Stainton, 1884)
- Goniodoma millierella Ragonot, 1882
- Goniodoma nemesi Capuse, 1970
- Goniodoma sinica Li & Zheng, 2002
