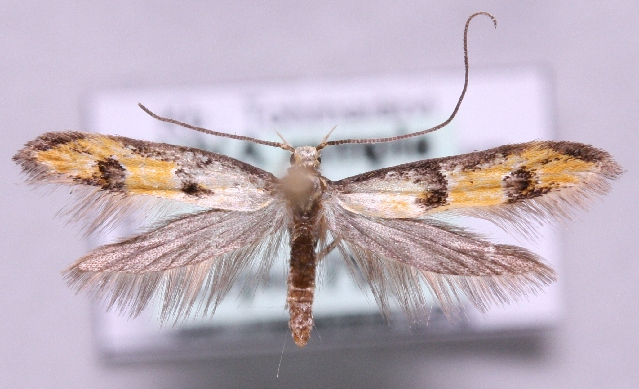

Scientific classification
- Kingdom: Animalia
- Phylum: Arthropoda
- Class: Insecta
- Order: Lepidoptera
- Family: Elachistidae
- Genus: Heinemannia
- Species: H. laspeyrella

Binomial name
- Heinemannia laspeyrella (Hübner, 1796)

Synonyms
- Tinea laspeyrella Hubner, 1796

= Heinemannia laspeyrella =

Species of moth

Heinemannia laspeyrella is a species of moth of the family Elachistidae. It is found in northern, central and eastern Europe. In the east, the range extends up the Ural and in the south to Siberia.

The wingspan is 17–21 mm. Adults are on wing from mid-May to the beginning of July in one generation per year.

The larvae feed on Lathyrus pisiformis, Orobus vernus and Trifolium species.
