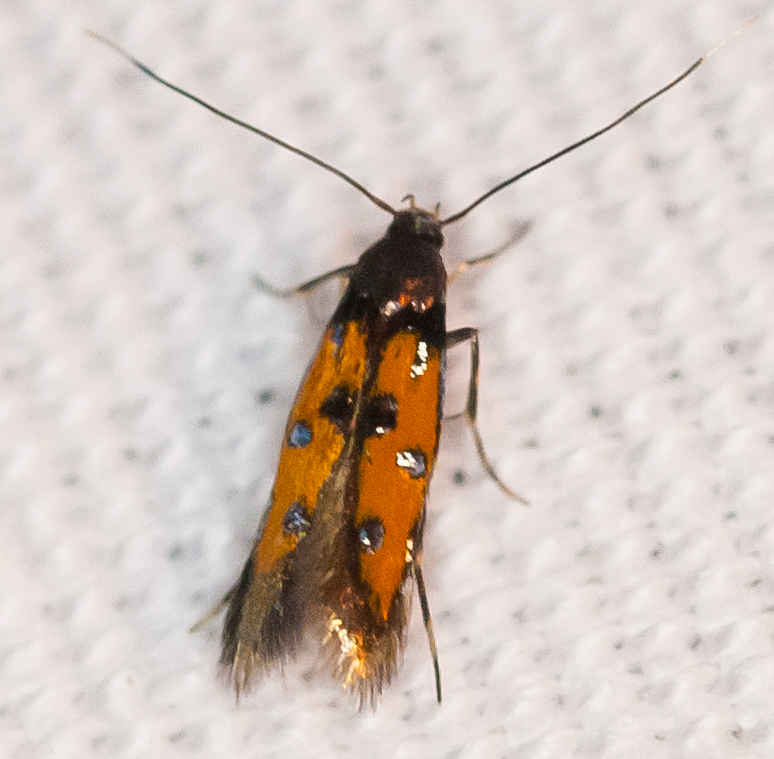

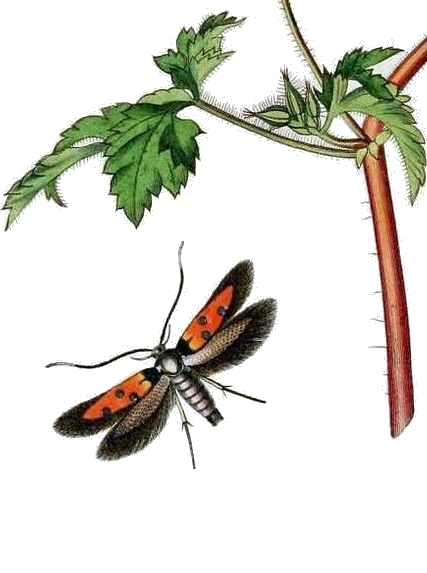
- Illustration from John Curtis's British Entomology

Scientific classification
- Kingdom: Animalia
- Phylum: Arthropoda
- Clade: Pancrustacea
- Class: Insecta
- Order: Lepidoptera
- Family: Elachistidae
- Genus: Chrysoclista
- Species: C. linneella

Binomial name
- Chrysoclista linneella (Clerck, 1759)

Synonyms
- List: Glyphipteryx linneella (Clerck, 1759); Phalaena linneella Clerck, 1759; Elachista gemmatella Costa, 1836; Elachista linnaeella Zeller, 1839; Oecophora obscurilinneella Bruand, 1859; Chrysoclista schaefferella Duponchel, 1828

= Chrysoclista linneella =

Species of moth

Chrysoclista linneella, (common names include Linnaeus's spangle-wing, linden bark borer and cosmet) is a moth of the family Agonoxenidae found in Europe and North America.

== Description ==
The wingspan is 10–13 millimetres (0.4–0.5 in). The head is dark brown. The antennae shiny dark grey-brown, with about 10 white segments at the tip. The thorax and tegulae shiny grey-brown. The forewings are light orange and broadly blackish-brown outlined. The border is narrowest on the costal area. The wing pattern consists of three round, warty, silvery shiny spots. The first spot has a tuft of protruding, black-brown scales and is located at 1/3 of the inner edge of the forewing. The second is located just before half of the length of the costa, the third at 2/3 of the length of the inner edge of the wing. A silvery line lies in the base of the wings, another lies opposite the outer dorsal spot on the costa. The fringed scales are grey-brown. The hind wings are brownish grey and have a bronze sheen. In some specimens, the orange basic coloration of the forewings may be partially or completely darkened. In the females, the silvery spots and lines on the forewings are larger.

In the males, the gnathos arms are very short, rounded and strongly toothed. The tegumen is longer than it is wide. The valves are trimmed and distally slightly dilated. The anellus lobes are distally strongly dilated and have a subapical semicircular indentation inside; the apex is toothed. The aedeagus is strongly curved and has a fork-shaped tip. The truncated valves and the shape of the anellus lobes are characteristic of the species.

In females, the posterior apophyses are about twice as long as the anterior apophyses. The eighth tergite is sclerotized and laterally concave. The genital plate has triangular sclerotization. The antrum is quite wide and has a rectangular, weakly sclerotized extension. The ductus bursae is narrow and gradually widens into the corpus bursae. It is less than 1.5 times as long as the corpus bursae. The corpus bursae is oval and distally dilated.

== Biology ==
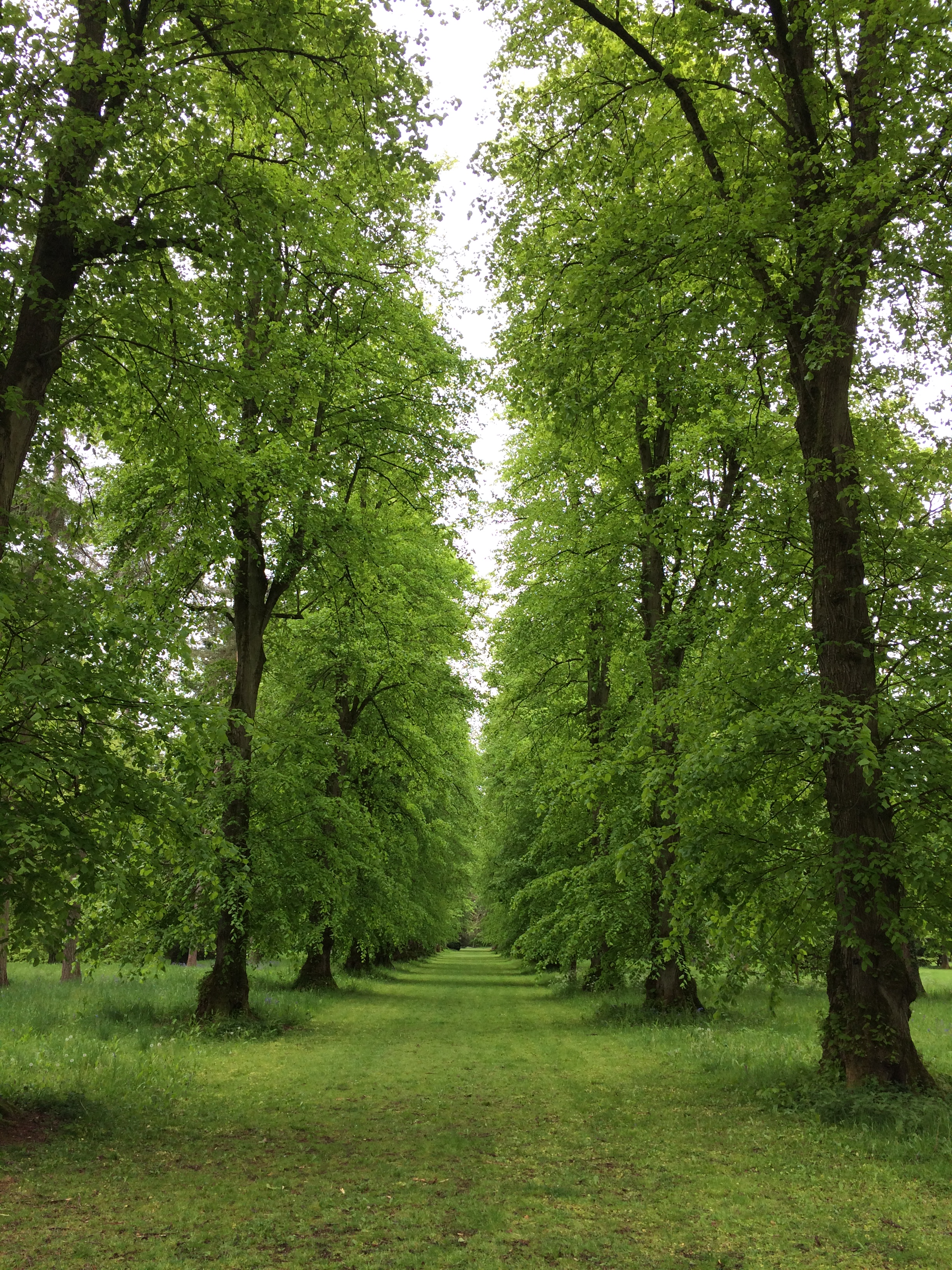
A lime avenue

Adults are on wing from May to September.The caterpillars develop on lime (Tilia cordata) and Dutch lime (Tilia europaea). Older records on beech (Fagus) and apple trees (Malus) require confirmation. The caterpillars live from August to May in feeding tunnels and round chambers under the bark of tree trunks. The infestation can be recognized by the light brown caterpillar droppings, which appear in bark cracks. Preference is given to old trees and those weakened by annual tree pruning. The caterpillars pupate within the feeding tunnels, but adult caterpillars have also been found on dried leaves, which indicates that they also leave the feeding tunnels to pupate. The species forms one generation a year, the moths fly from the end of May to August. They rest on the bark of the host plants or walk around. Moths can only be observed very rarely in natural habitats. Often, on the other hand, they are found in large numbers in cities with lime tree avenues

== Distribution ==
It is found in most of Europe.
