= Ischnopsis =

Scientific classification
- Kingdom: Animalia
- Phylum: Arthropoda
- Clade: Pancrustacea
- Class: Insecta
- Order: Lepidoptera
- Family: Coleophoridae
- Genus: Ischnopsis; Walsingham, 1881
- Species: I. angustella

Binomial name
- Ischnopsis angustella Walsingham, 1881

Genus of moths

Ischnopsis is a genus of moths, belonging to the family Coleophoridae containing only one species, Ischnopsis angustella, which is known from South Africa.
