= Porotica =

Scientific classification
- Kingdom: Animalia
- Phylum: Arthropoda
- Clade: Pancrustacea
- Class: Insecta
- Order: Lepidoptera
- Family: Coleophoridae
- Genus: Porotica; Meyrick, 1913
- Species: P. astragalis

Binomial name
- Porotica astragalis Meyrick, 1913

Genus of moths

Porotica is a genus of moths, belonging to the family Coleophoridae containing only one species, Porotica astragalis, which is known from South Africa.
