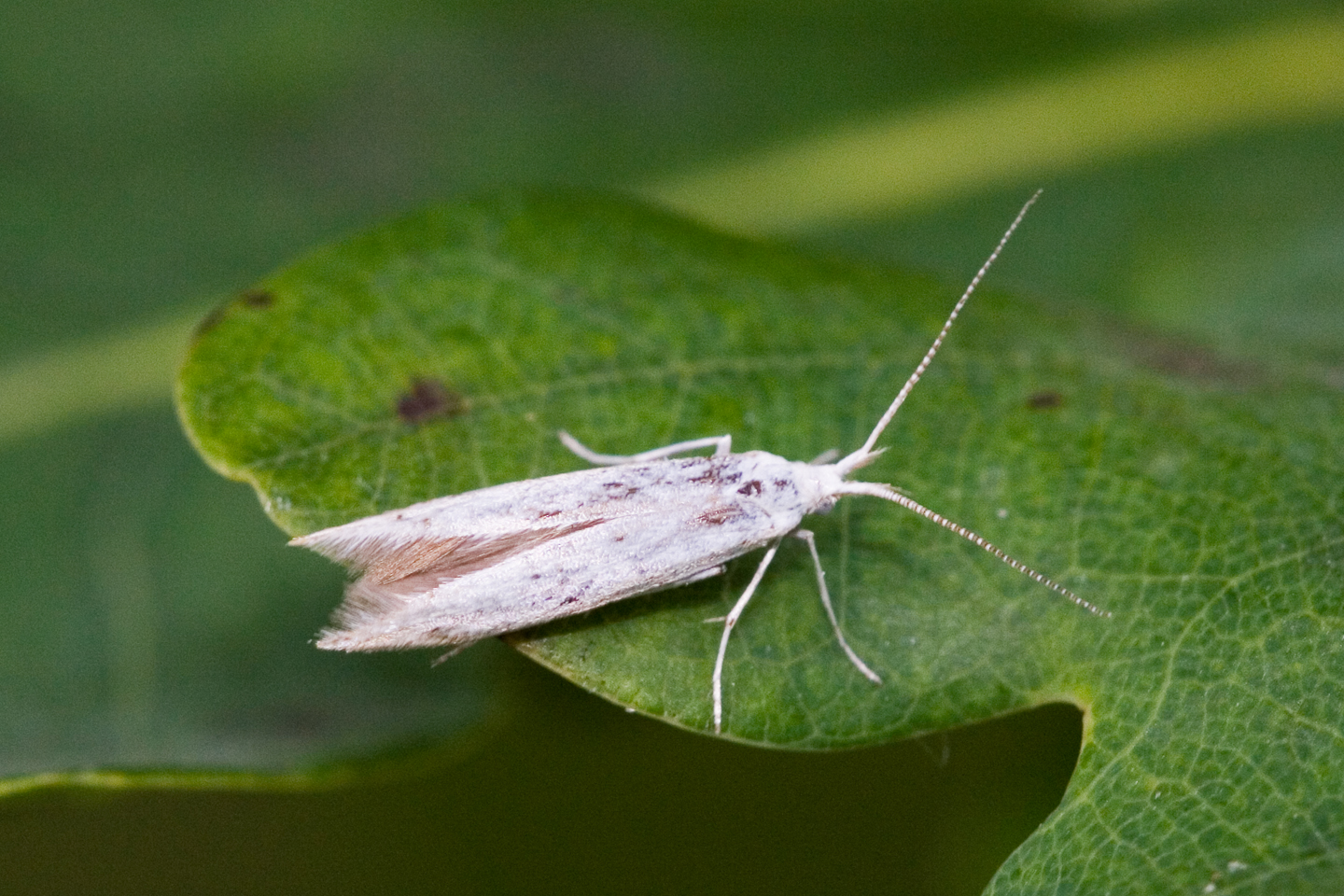
- Adult of an unidentified case-bearer species

Scientific classification
- Kingdom: Animalia
- Phylum: Arthropoda
- Clade: Pancrustacea
- Class: Insecta
- Order: Lepidoptera
- Infraorder: Heteroneura
- Clade: Eulepidoptera
- Clade: Ditrysia
- Clade: Apoditrysia
- Superfamily: Gelechioidea
- Family: Coleophoridae; Hübner, [1825]

Diversity
- Over 1,000 species

= Coleophoridae =

Case-bearers

Family of moths

The Coleophoridae are a family of small moths, belonging to the huge superfamily Gelechioidea. Collectively known as case-bearers, casebearing moths or case moths, this family is represented on all continents, but the majority are found in temperate areas of the Northern Hemisphere. They are most common in the Palearctic, and rare in sub-Saharan Africa, South America, and Australia; consequently, they probably originated (like most or all other Gelechioidea families) in northern Eurasia. They are relatively common in houses, they seek out moist areas to rest and procreate.

== Description and ecology ==
These "micromoths" are generally of slender build, and like in many of their relatives, the margins of their wings usually consist of a "fringe" of hairs. The tiny caterpillar larvae initially feed internally on the leaves, flowers, or seeds of their host plants. When they emerge to feed externally, they usually construct a protective silken case, discarded and built anew as they grow and molt. The common names of the Coleophoridae refer to this habit.

The bagworm moths (Psychidae), which also belong to the primitive Ditrysia (although to superfamily Tineoidea, not Gelechioidea), build similar cases as larvae. As opposed to these, though, the case-bearer females leave their cases to pupate and have normally developed wings as adults, instead of being neotenous as female bagworms usually are.

== Taxonomy and systematics ==
About 95% of the over 1,000 described species have been placed in the "wastebin genus" Coleophora. Many proposals have been made to split smaller genera from Coleophora, but few have been accepted, due to the uncertainties about which species are closest to the type species of Coleophora – C. anatipennella – and thus would remain in the genus.

Regarding the family's circumscription versus other Gelechioidea, it is by now far less disputed than usual for this superfamily. The Blastobasidae, Momphidae (mompha moths), Pterolonchidae, and Symmocidae have formerly been included in the Coleophoridae as subfamilies, but are more often considered separate families today. With the internal relationships of Coleophoridae genera (as far as they are widely accepted) and species essentially unresolved due to the classification problems mentioned above, no subfamilies or tribes are accepted in the family for the time being.

=== Genera ===
Genera of case-bearers at least provisionally accepted by recent authors include:

- Amblyxena
- Augasma
- Coleophora
- Corythangela (Batrachedridae)
- Enscepastra (Batrachedridae)
- Goniodoma
- Iriothyrsa (Agonoxeninae)
- Ischnophanes
- Ischnopsis (Agonoxeninae)
- Metriotes
- Nasamonica
- Porotica (Agonoxeninae)

== See also ==
- List of Coleophora species
