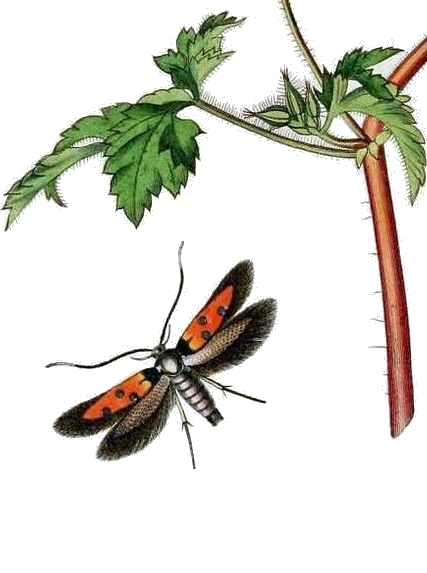
- Chrysoclista linneella

Scientific classification (disputed)
- Kingdom: Animalia
- Phylum: Arthropoda
- Clade: Pancrustacea
- Class: Insecta
- Order: Lepidoptera
- Family: Elachistidae
- Subfamily: Agonoxeninae; Meyrick, 1926

Synonyms
- Agonoxenidae; Blastodacnidae (but see text)

= Agonoxeninae =

Subfamily of insects

The Agonoxeninae are a subfamily of moths.

== History of classification ==
Formerly, the subfamily only contained four named species – all in the type genus Agonoxena – if (e.g. following Nielsen et al., 1996). Such a monotypic arrangement is fairly unusual in modern taxonomy without explicit need due to phylogenetic constraints.

Hodges (in Kristensen, 1999) retained the Blastodacnidae in the Agonoxenidae, giving a grouping of some 31 genera, and treating the whole as a subfamily Agonoxeninae of the grass-miner moths (Elachistidae). Collectively, the Agonoxenidae and "Blastodacnidae" are known as palm moths.

== Genera ==
- Agonoxena Meyrick, 1921
- Asymphorodes (formerly in Cosmopterigidae)
- Cladobrostis
- Diacholotis
- Gnamptonoma Meyrick, 1917
- Helcanthica
- Ischnopsis
- Nanodacna
- Nicanthes
- Pammeces Zeller, 1863 (formerly in Cosmopterigidae)
- Pauroptila
- Porotica
- Proterocosma (formerly in Cosmopterigidae)

== Former genera ==
Blastodacna, Dystebenna, Haplochrois, Heinemannia and Spuleria are sometimes placed here, sometimes in the Elachistidae (or Blastodacnidae).

Other genera formerly placed here:

- Chrysoclista
- Colonophora
- Glaucacna
- Palaeomystella
- Panclintis
- Prochola
- Tocasta Busck, 1912
- Zaratha
