= List of moths of Australia (Cosmopterigidae) =

Partial list of Australian moths

This is a list of the Australian species of the family Cosmopterigidae. It also acts as an index to the species articles and forms part of the full List of moths of Australia.

== Chrysopeleiinae ==
- Cholotis exodroma (Meyrick, 1897)
- Cholotis semnostola (Meyrick, 1897)
- Eumenodora encrypta Meyrick, 1906
- Ithome lassula Hodges, 1962
- Leptozestis anagrapta (Meyrick, 1897)
- Leptozestis antithetis (Meyrick, 1897)
- Leptozestis argoscia (Lower, 1904)
- Leptozestis autochroa (Meyrick, 1915)
- Leptozestis capnopora (Meyrick, 1897)
- Leptozestis cataspoda (Meyrick, 1897)
- Leptozestis charmosyna (Meyrick, 1921)
- Leptozestis crassipalpis (Turner, 1923)
- Leptozestis crebra (Meyrick, 1906)
- Leptozestis cyclonica (Meyrick, 1897)
- Leptozestis decalopha (Lower, 1904)
- Leptozestis ecstatica (Meyrick, 1897)
- Leptozestis epiphrixa (Meyrick, 1897)
- Leptozestis euryplaca (Lower, 1893)
- Leptozestis eximia (Meyrick, 1897)
- Leptozestis gnophodes (Lower, 1904)
- Leptozestis harmosta (Meyrick, 1897)
- Leptozestis hestiopa (Meyrick, 1897)
- Leptozestis melanopa (Meyrick, 1897)
- Leptozestis ochlopa (Meyrick, 1897)
- Leptozestis parascia (Meyrick, 1897)
- Leptozestis phylactis (Meyrick, 1897)
- Leptozestis psarotricha (Meyrick, 1897)
- Leptozestis psoralea (Meyrick, 1897)
- Leptozestis sedula (Meyrick, 1897)
- Leptozestis spodoptera (Turner, 1923)
- Leptozestis strophicodes (Meyrick, 1917)
- Leptozestis tephras (Meyrick, 1897)
- Leptozestis toreutica (Meyrick, 1897)
- Leptozestis tropaea (Meyrick, 1897)
- Leptozestis valida (Meyrick, 1919)
- Orthromicta argonota Turner, 1923
- Orthromicta galactitis Meyrick, 1897
- Orthromicta semifumea Turner, 1923
- Trachydora acrocyrta (Turner, 1923)
- Trachydora acromianta (Turner, 1923)
- Trachydora actinia Meyrick, 1897
- Trachydora anthrascopa Lower, 1904
- Trachydora aphrocoma Meyrick, 1897
- Trachydora argoneura Lower, 1904
- Trachydora astragalota Meyrick, 1897
- Trachydora capnopa (Lower, 1894)
- Trachydora centromela Lower, 1904
- Trachydora chalybanthes Meyrick, 1897
- Trachydora chlorozona Meyrick, 1897
- Trachydora chrysodoxa Meyrick, 1915
- Trachydora corysta Meyrick, 1897
- Trachydora dionysias Meyrick, 1921
- Trachydora droserodes Meyrick, 1897
- Trachydora fumea (Turner, 1923)
- Trachydora heliodora (Lower, 1894)
- Trachydora heliotricha (Lower, 1894)
- Trachydora illustris Meyrick, 1897
- Trachydora iridoptila Meyrick, 1921
- Trachydora leucobathra Lower, 1904
- Trachydora leucura Meyrick, 1897
- Trachydora macrostola (Turner, 1923)
- Trachydora microleuca Lower, 1904
- Trachydora molybdimera Lower, 1904
- Trachydora musaea Meyrick, 1897
- Trachydora nomodoxa Meyrick, 1897
- Trachydora oxypeuces Turner, 1939
- Trachydora oxyzona Meyrick, 1897
- Trachydora peroneta Meyrick, 1897
- Trachydora placophanes Meyrick, 1897
- Trachydora polyzona Lower, 1904
- Trachydora porphyrescens (Lower, 1894)
- Trachydora psammodes Meyrick, 1897
- Trachydora pygaea (Turner, 1923)
- Trachydora stephanopa Meyrick, 1897
- Trachydora tephronota (Turner, 1923)
- Trachydora thyrsophora Meyrick, 1897
- Trachydora zophopepla Lower, 1904

== Cosmopteriginae ==
- Cosmopterix aculeata Meyrick, 1909
- Cosmopterix attenuatella (Walker, 1864)
- Cosmopterix calliochra (Turner, 1926)
- Cosmopterix chalcelata (Turner, 1923)
- Cosmopterix chlorochalca (Meyrick, 1915)
- Cosmopterix cuprea Lower, 1916
- Cosmopterix dulcivora Meyrick, 1919
- Cosmopterix epizona (Meyrick, 1897)
- Cosmopterix heliactis (Meyrick, 1897)
- Cosmopterix isoteles (Meyrick, 1919)
- Cosmopterix macrula (Meyrick, 1897)
- Cosmopterix mystica (Meyrick, 1897)
- Cosmopterix phaesphora (Turner, 1923)
- Diatonica macrogramma Meyrick, 1921
- Echinoscelis pandani (Turner, 1923)
- Glaphyristis lithinopa Meyrick, 1917
- Glaphyristis marmarea Meyrick, 1897
- Haplochrois chlorometalla Meyrick, 1897
- Haplochrois tanyptera Turner, 1923
- Haplochrois thalycra Meyrick, 1897
- Heureta cirrhodora (Meyrick, 1915)
- Isorrhoa aetheria (Meyrick, 1897)
- Isorrhoa ancistrota (Turner, 1923)
- Isorrhoa aphrosema (Meyrick, 1897)
- Isorrhoa atmozona Turner, 1917
- Isorrhoa implicata Meyrick, 1920
- Isorrhoa loxoschema Turner, 1923
- Labdia anarithma (Meyrick, 1889)
- Labdia ancylosema Turner, 1923
- Labdia apenthes Turner, 1939
- Labdia aresta Turner, 1926
- Labdia argophracta Turner, 1923
- Labdia argyrozona (Lower, 1904)
- Labdia arimaspia (Meyrick, 1897)
- Labdia auchmerodes Turner, 1939
- Labdia autotoma (Meyrick, 1919)
- Labdia bathrosema (Meyrick, 1897)
- Labdia bryomima (Meyrick, 1897)
- Labdia calthula Turner, 1923
- Labdia ceraunica (Meyrick, 1897)
- Labdia chalcoplecta Turner, 1933
- Labdia charisia (Meyrick, 1897)
- Labdia chryselectra (Meyrick, 1897)
- Labdia cosmangela Meyrick, 1923
- Labdia crocotypa Turner, 1923
- Labdia cyanogramma (Meyrick, 1897)
- Labdia deliciosella Walker, 1864
- Labdia ejaculata Meyrick, 1921
- Labdia eumelaena (Meyrick, 1897)
- Labdia glaucoxantha Meyrick, 1921
- Labdia hexaspila Turner, 1923
- Labdia hierarcha (Meyrick, 1897)
- Labdia irrigua (Meyrick, 1915)
- Labdia ischnotypa Turner, 1923
- Labdia leucombra (Meyrick, 1897)
- Labdia leuconota Turner, 1923
- Labdia microchalca Meyrick, 1921
- Labdia mitrophora Turner, 1923
- Labdia myrrhicoma (Meyrick, 1917)
- Labdia nesophora (Meyrick, 1897)
- Labdia niphocera Turner, 1923
- Labdia niphostephes Turner, 1923
- Labdia ochrostephana Turner, 1923
- Labdia orthoschema Turner, 1923
- Labdia oxysema (Meyrick, 1897)
- Labdia oxytoma (Meyrick, 1897)
- Labdia pammeces Turner, 1923
- Labdia pantophyrta Turner, 1923
- Labdia phaeocala Turner, 1926
- Labdia pileata (Meyrick, 1897)
- Labdia promacha (Meyrick, 1897)
- Labdia rhadinopis Turner, 1923
- Labdia rhoecosticha Turner, 1923
- Labdia schismatias (Meyrick, 1897)
- Labdia symbolias (Meyrick, 1906)
- Labdia thalamaula (Meyrick, 1915)
- Labdia thermophila (Lower, 1900)
- Labdia triploa Turner, 1923
- Labdia tristoecha Turner, 1923
- Labdia trivincta (Meyrick, 1897)
- Labdia zonobela Turner, 1923
- Limnaecia adiacrita Turner, 1923
- Limnaecia anisodesma Lower, 1904
- Limnaecia bisignis Meyrick, 1921
- Limnaecia callimitris Meyrick, 1897
- Limnaecia camptosema Meyrick, 1897
- Limnaecia charactis Meyrick, 1897
- Limnaecia chionospila Meyrick, 1897
- Limnaecia chrysonesa Meyrick, 1897
- Limnaecia chrysothorax Meyrick, 1920
- Limnaecia cirrhosema Turner, 1923
- Limnaecia cirrhozona Turner, 1923
- Limnaecia crossomela Lower, 1908
- Limnaecia cybophora Meyrick, 1897
- Limnaecia definitiva (T.P. Lucas, 1901)
- Limnaecia elaphropa Turner, 1923
- Limnaecia epimictis Meyrick, 1897
- Limnaecia eristica Meyrick, 1919
- Limnaecia eugramma Lower, 1899
- Limnaecia hemidoma Meyrick, 1897
- Limnaecia hemimitra Turner, 1923
- Limnaecia heterozona Lower, 1904
- Limnaecia ida Lower, 1908
- Limnaecia iriastis Meyrick, 1897
- Limnaecia isodesma Lower, 1904
- Limnaecia isozona Meyrick, 1897
- Limnaecia leptomeris Meyrick, 1897
- Limnaecia leptozona Turner, 1923
- Limnaecia leucomita Turner, 1923
- Limnaecia loxoscia Lower, 1923
- Limnaecia lunacrescens (T.P. Lucas, 1901)
- Limnaecia melanoma (Lower, 1897)
- Limnaecia monoxantha (Meyrick, 1922)
- Limnaecia novalis Meyrick, 1920
- Limnaecia ochrozona Meyrick, 1897
- Limnaecia orbigera Turner, 1923
- Limnaecia orthochroa (Lower, 1899)
- Limnaecia pallidula Turner, 1923
- Limnaecia phragmitella Stainton, 1851
- Limnaecia pycnogramma (Lower, 1918)
- Limnaecia platychlora Meyrick, 1915
- Limnaecia platyochra Turner, 1923
- Limnaecia platyscia Turner, 1923
- Limnaecia polyactis Meyrick, 1921
- Limnaecia polycydista Turner, 1926
- Limnaecia pterolopha Meyrick, 1920
- Limnaecia scoliosema Meyrick, 1897
- Limnaecia stenosticha Turner, 1926
- Limnaecia symplecta Turner, 1923
- Limnaecia syntaracta Meyrick, 1897
- Limnaecia tetraplanetis Meyrick, 1897
- Limnaecia triplaneta Meyrick, 1921
- Limnaecia trisema Meyrick, 1897
- Limnaecia trissodesma (Meyrick, 1887)
- Limnaecia trixantha (Lower, 1920)
- Limnaecia xanthopelta Lower, 1903
- Limnaecia xanthopis Meyrick, 1920
- Limnaecia zonomacula Lower, 1908
- Limnaecia zotica Meyrick, 1921
- Macrobathra allocrana Turner, 1916
- Macrobathra allophyla (Turner, 1944)
- Macrobathra alternatella (Walker, 1864)
- Macrobathra anacampta Meyrick, 1914
- Macrobathra anemarcha Meyrick, 1886
- Macrobathra anemodes Meyrick, 1886
- Macrobathra aneurae Turner, 1932
- Macrobathra aphristis Meyrick, 1889
- Macrobathra arrectella (Walker, 1864)
- Macrobathra asemanta Lower, 1894
- Macrobathra astrota Meyrick, 1914
- Macrobathra baliomitra Turner, 1932
- Macrobathra basisticha (Turner, 1936)
- Macrobathra bigerella (Walker, 1864)
- Macrobathra brontodes Meyrick, 1886
- Macrobathra callipetala Turner, 1932
- Macrobathra callispila Turner, 1916
- Macrobathra ceraunobola Meyrick, 1886
- Macrobathra chryseostola Turner, 1932
- Macrobathra chrysospila Meyrick, 1886
- Macrobathra chrysotoxa Meyrick, 1886
- Macrobathra cirrhodora Meyrick, 1915
- Macrobathra constrictella (Walker, 1864)
- Macrobathra crococosma Meyrick, 1922
- Macrobathra dasyplaca Lower, 1894
- Macrobathra decataea Meyrick, 1914
- Macrobathra desmotoma Meyrick, 1886
- Macrobathra diplochrysa Lower, 1894
- Macrobathra dispila Turner, 1932
- Macrobathra drosera Lower, 1901
- Macrobathra embroneta Turner, 1932
- Macrobathra epimela (Lower, 1894)
- Macrobathra erythrocephala (Lower, 1904)
- Macrobathra eudesma Lower, 1900
- Macrobathra euryleuca Meyrick, 1886
- Macrobathra euryxantha Meyrick, 1886
- Macrobathra euspila Turner, 1932
- Macrobathra galenaea Meyrick, 1902
- Macrobathra gastroleuca Lower, 1905
- Macrobathra hamaxitodes Meyrick, 1886
- Macrobathra harmostis Meyrick, 1889
- Macrobathra heminephela Meyrick, 1886
- Macrobathra hemitropa Meyrick, 1886
- Macrobathra heterocera Lower, 1894
- Macrobathra heterozona Meyrick, 1889
- Macrobathra hexadyas Meyrick, 1906
- Macrobathra homocosma Meyrick, 1902
- Macrobathra honoratella (Walker, 1864)
- Macrobathra humilis (Turner, 1933)
- Macrobathra hyalistis Meyrick, 1889
- Macrobathra isoscelana Lower, 1893
- Macrobathra leucopeda Meyrick, 1886
- Macrobathra leucozancla Turner, 1932
- Macrobathra lychnophora Turner, 1932
- Macrobathra melanargyra Meyrick, 1886
- Macrobathra melanomitra Meyrick, 1886
- Macrobathra melanota Meyrick, 1886
- Macrobathra mesopora Meyrick, 1886
- Macrobathra micropis Lower, 1894
- Macrobathra microspora Lower, 1900
- Macrobathra monoclina Meyrick, 1915
- Macrobathra monostadia Meyrick, 1886
- Macrobathra myriophthalma Meyrick, 1886
- Macrobathra nephelomorpha Meyrick, 1886
- Macrobathra nimbifera Turner, 1932
- Macrobathra niphadobola Meyrick, 1886
- Macrobathra nomaea Meyrick, 1914
- Macrobathra notozyga Meyrick, 1914
- Macrobathra paracentra Lower, 1893
- Macrobathra parthenistis Meyrick, 1889
- Macrobathra phernaea Lower, 1899
- Macrobathra philopsamma Lower, 1900
- Macrobathra phryganina Turner, 1932
- Macrobathra platychroa Lower, 1897
- Macrobathra platyzona Turner, 1932
- Macrobathra polypasta Turner, 1932
- Macrobathra pompholyctis Meyrick, 1889
- Macrobathra porphyrea Meyrick, 1886
- Macrobathra psathyrodes Turner, 1932
- Macrobathra rhodospila Meyrick, 1886
- Macrobathra rhythmodes Turner, 1916
- Macrobathra rubicundella (Walker, 1864)
- Macrobathra sarcoleuca Meyrick, 1915
- Macrobathra stenosema Turner, 1932
- Macrobathra synacta Meyrick, 1920
- Macrobathra synastra Meyrick, 1886
- Macrobathra syncoma Lower, 1899
- Macrobathra trimorpha Meyrick, 1889
- Macrobathra trithyra Meyrick, 1886
- Macrobathra vexillariata Lucas, 1901
- Macrobathra vividella (R. Felder & Rogenhofer, 1875)
- Macrobathra xanthoplaca Meyrick, 1902
- Macrobathra xuthocoma Meyrick, 1886
- Macrobathra xylopterella (Walker, 1864)
- Macrobathra zonodesma Lower, 1900
- Mimodoxa dryina Lower, 1901
- Mimodoxa empyrophanes Turner, 1932
- Mimodoxa loxospila Turner, 1932
- Mimodoxa metallica (Lower, 1899)
- Mimodoxa phaulophanes Turner, 1932
- Mimodoxa tricommatica Turner, 1932
- Morphotica mirifica Meyrick, 1915
- Mothonodes obusta (Meyrick, 1921)
- Otonoma anemois Meyrick, 1897
- Otonoma leucochlaena Meyrick, 1919
- Otonoma sophronica Meyrick, 1920
- Otonoma sphenosema (Meyrick, 1897)
- Paratheta calyptra Lower, 1899
- Paratheta lasiomela Lower, 1899
- Paratheta ochrocoma Lower, 1899
- Pechyptila rhodocharis Meyrick, 1921
- Persicoptila anthophyes Turner, 1926
- Persicoptila arenosa Turner, 1917
- Persicoptila dasysceles Turner, 1917
- Persicoptila hesperis Meyrick, 1897
- Persicoptila mimochora Meyrick, 1897
- Persicoptila oenosceles Turner, 1917
- Persicoptila peltias Meyrick, 1897
- Persicoptila ramulosa Meyrick, 1921
- Persicoptila rhodocnemis Meyrick, 1915
- Persicoptila tritozona Turner, 1917
- Persicoptila vinosa Meyrick, 1921
- Phaneroctena homopsara Turner, 1923
- Phaneroctena pentasticta Turner, 1923
- Phaneroctena spodopasta Turner, 1923
- Pyroderces aellotricha (Meyrick, 1889)
- Pyroderces anaclastis Meyrick, 1897
- Pyroderces argobalana Meyrick, 1915
- Pyroderces eupogon Turner, 1926
- Pyroderces falcatella (Stainton, 1859)
- Pyroderces hapalodes Turner, 1923
- Pyroderces incertulella (Walker, 1864)
- Pyroderces mesoptila Meyrick, 1897
- Pyroderces pogonias Turner, 1923
- Pyroderces pyrrhodes Meyrick, 1897
- Pyroderces rileyi (Walsingham, 1882)
- Pyroderces tenuilinea Turner, 1923
- Pyroderces terminella (Walker, 1864)
- Rhadinastis microlychna Meyrick, 1897
- Rhadinastis sideropa Meyrick, 1897
- Scaeosopha mitescens (T.P. Lucas, 1901)
- Stagmatophora argyrostrepta (Meyrick, 1897)
- Stagmatophora clinarcha Meyrick, 1921
- Stagmatophora haploceros Turner, 1926
- Stagmatophora niphocrana Turner, 1926
- Stagmatophora notoleuca Turner, 1923
- Stagmatophora tetradesma (Meyrick, 1897)
- Tetraconta clepsimorpha Turner, 1932
- Trissodoris euphaedra (Lower, 1904)
- Trissodoris honorariella (Walsingham, 1907)
- Xestocasis balanochrysa Meyrick, 1915
- Xestocasis colometra Meyrick, 1915
- Xestocasis hololampra Meyrick, 1915
