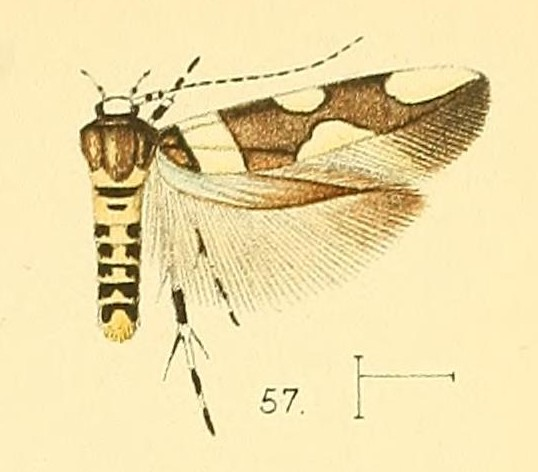
- Macrobathra distincta

Scientific classification
- Kingdom: Animalia
- Phylum: Arthropoda
- Class: Insecta
- Order: Lepidoptera
- Family: Cosmopterigidae
- Subfamily: Cosmopteriginae
- Genus: Macrobathra; Meyrick, 1883

Synonyms
- Leurozancla Turner, 1933

= Macrobathra =

Genus of moths

Macrobathra is a genus of moths in the family Cosmopterigidae. Most species are endemic to Australia.

== Species ==
- Macrobathra allocrana Turner, 1916
- Macrobathra allophyla (Turner, 1944)
- Macrobathra alternatella (Walker, 1864)
- Macrobathra anacampta Meyrick, 1914
- Macrobathra anemarcha Meyrick, 1886
- Macrobathra anemodes Meyrick, 1886
- Macrobathra aneurae Turner, 1932
- Macrobathra anisodora Meyrick, 1924
- Macrobathra antimeloda Meyrick, 1930
- Macrobathra aphristis Meyrick, 1889
- Macrobathra arneutis
- Macrobathra arrectella (Walker, 1864)
- Macrobathra asemanta Lower, 1894
- Macrobathra astrota Meyrick, 1914
- Macrobathra auratella Viette, 1958
- Macrobathra baliomitra Turner, 1932
- Macrobathra basisticha (Turner, 1936)
- Macrobathra bigerella (Walker, 1864)
- Macrobathra brontodes Meyrick, 1886
- Macrobathra callipetala Turner, 1932
- Macrobathra callispila Turner, 1916
- Macrobathra ceraunobola Meyrick, 1886
- Macrobathra chryseostola Turner, 1932
- Macrobathra chrysospila Meyrick, 1886
- Macrobathra chrysotoxa Meyrick, 1886
- Macrobathra cineralella
- Macrobathra constrictella (Walker, 1864)
- Macrobathra crococephala Meyrick, 1936
- Macrobathra crococosma Meyrick, 1922
- Macrobathra dasyplaca Lower, 1894
- Macrobathra decataea Meyrick, 1914
- Macrobathra deltozona
- Macrobathra desmotoma Meyrick, 1886
- Macrobathra diplochrysa Lower, 1894
- Macrobathra dispila Turner, 1932
- Macrobathra distincta (Walsingham, 1891)
- Macrobathra drosera Lower, 1901
- Macrobathra embroneta Turner, 1932
- Macrobathra epimela (Lower, 1894)
- Macrobathra equestris
- Macrobathra erythrocephala (Lower, 1904)
- Macrobathra eudesma Lower, 1900
- Macrobathra euryleuca Meyrick, 1886
- Macrobathra euryxantha Meyrick, 1886
- Macrobathra euspila Turner, 1932
- Macrobathra fasciata (Walsingham, 1891)
- Macrobathra flavidus F.J. Qian & Y.Q. Liu, 1997
- Macrobathra galenaea Meyrick, 1902
- Macrobathra gastroleuca Lower, 1905
- Macrobathra gentilis
- Macrobathra hamata
- Macrobathra hamaxitodes Meyrick, 1886
- Macrobathra harmostis Meyrick, 1889
- Macrobathra hedrastis
- Macrobathra heminephela Meyrick, 1886
- Macrobathra hemitropa Meyrick, 1886
- Macrobathra heterocera Lower, 1894
- Macrobathra heterozona Meyrick, 1889
- Macrobathra hexadyas Meyrick, 1906
- Macrobathra homocosma Meyrick, 1902
- Macrobathra honoratella (Walker, 1864)
- Macrobathra humilis (Turner, 1933)
- Macrobathra hyalistis Meyrick, 1889
- Macrobathra isoscelana Lower, 1893
- Macrobathra latipterophora H.H. Li & X.P. Wang, 2004
- Macrobathra leucopeda Meyrick, 1886
- Macrobathra leucozancla Turner, 1932
- Macrobathra lychnophora Turner, 1932
- Macrobathra melanargyra Meyrick, 1886
- Macrobathra melanomitra Meyrick, 1886
- Macrobathra melanota Meyrick, 1886
- Macrobathra mesopora Meyrick, 1886
- Macrobathra micropis Lower, 1894
- Macrobathra microspora Lower, 1900
- Macrobathra monoclina
- Macrobathra monostadia Meyrick, 1886
- Macrobathra myriophthalma Meyrick, 1886
- Macrobathra myrocoma
- Macrobathra nephelomorpha Meyrick, 1886
- Macrobathra neurocoma
- Macrobathra nimbifera Turner, 1932
- Macrobathra niphadobola Meyrick, 1886
- Macrobathra nomaea
- Macrobathra notomitra
- Macrobathra notozyga Meyrick, 1914
- Macrobathra ochanota
- Macrobathra paracentra Lower, 1893
- Macrobathra parthenistis Meyrick, 1889
- Macrobathra peraeota Meyrick, 1921
- Macrobathra petalitis
- Macrobathra phernaea Lower, 1899
- Macrobathra philopsamma Lower, 1900
- Macrobathra phryganina Turner, 1932
- Macrobathra platychroa Lower, 1897
- Macrobathra platyzona Turner, 1932
- Macrobathra polypasta Turner, 1932
- Macrobathra pompholyctis Meyrick, 1889
- Macrobathra porphyrea Meyrick, 1886
- Macrobathra proxena Meyrick, 1914
- Macrobathra psathyrodes Turner, 1932
- Macrobathra pyrodoxa
- Macrobathra quercea Moriuti, 1973
- Macrobathra recrepans Meyrick, 1926
- Macrobathra rhodospila Meyrick, 1886
- Macrobathra rhythmodes Turner, 1916
- Macrobathra rubicundella (Walker, 1864)
- Macrobathra sarcoleuca Meyrick, 1915
- Macrobathra sikoraella (Viette, 1956)
- Macrobathra stenosema Turner, 1932
- Macrobathra subharpalea (Legrand, 1966)
- Macrobathra superharpalea (Legrand, 1966)
- Macrobathra synacta Meyrick, 1920
- Macrobathra synastra Meyrick, 1886
- Macrobathra syncoma Lower, 1899
- Macrobathra trimorpha Meyrick, 1889
- Macrobathra trithyra Meyrick, 1886
- Macrobathra vexillariata Lucas, 1901
- Macrobathra vividella (R. Felder & Rogenhofer, 1875)
- Macrobathra xanthoplaca Meyrick, 1902
- Macrobathra xuthocoma Meyrick, 1886
- Macrobathra xylopterella (Walker, 1864)
- Macrobathra zonodesma Lower, 1900

== Selected former species ==
- Macrobathra centrophena
- Macrobathra cirrhodora Meyrick, 1915
- Macrobathra definitiva
- Macrobathra lunacrescens
- Macrobathra metallica
- Macrobathra monoxantha
