= Macrobathra hedrastis =

Scientific classification
- Kingdom: Animalia
- Phylum: Arthropoda
- Clade: Pancrustacea
- Class: Insecta
- Order: Lepidoptera
- Family: Cosmopterigidae
- Genus: Macrobathra
- Species: M. hedrastis

Binomial name
- Macrobathra hedrastis Meyrick, 1915

Species of moth

Macrobathra hedrastis is a moth in the family Cosmopterigidae. It is found in Burma.
