= Macrobathra hamata =

Scientific classification
- Kingdom: Animalia
- Phylum: Arthropoda
- Clade: Pancrustacea
- Class: Insecta
- Order: Lepidoptera
- Family: Cosmopterigidae
- Genus: Macrobathra
- Species: M. hamata

Binomial name
- Macrobathra hamata Meyrick, 1931

Species of moth

Macrobathra hamata is a moth in the family Cosmopterigidae.

== Distribution ==
It is found in India.
