= Rhadinastis loraria =

Scientific classification
- Kingdom: Animalia
- Phylum: Arthropoda
- Class: Insecta
- Order: Lepidoptera
- Family: Cosmopterigidae
- Genus: Rhadinastis
- Species: R. loraria

Binomial name
- Rhadinastis loraria Meyrick, 1917

Species of moth

Rhadinastis loraria is a moth in the family Cosmopterigidae. It was described by Edward Meyrick in 1917. It is found in India.
