= Macrobathra equestris =

Scientific classification
- Kingdom: Animalia
- Phylum: Arthropoda
- Clade: Pancrustacea
- Class: Insecta
- Order: Lepidoptera
- Family: Cosmopterigidae
- Genus: Macrobathra
- Species: M. equestris

Binomial name
- Macrobathra equestris Meyrick, 1910

Species of moth

Macrobathra equestris is a moth in the family Cosmopterigidae. It is found in India (Assam) and China.
