= Macrobathra anisodora =

Scientific classification
- Kingdom: Animalia
- Phylum: Arthropoda
- Clade: Pancrustacea
- Class: Insecta
- Order: Lepidoptera
- Family: Cosmopterigidae
- Genus: Macrobathra
- Species: M. anisodora

Binomial name
- Macrobathra anisodora Meyrick, 1924

Species of moth

Macrobathra anisodora is a moth in the family Cosmopterigidae. It was described by Edward Meyrick in 1924. It is found in South Africa.
