= Rhadinastis phoenicopa =

Scientific classification
- Kingdom: Animalia
- Phylum: Arthropoda
- Class: Insecta
- Order: Lepidoptera
- Family: Cosmopterigidae
- Genus: Rhadinastis
- Species: R. phoenicopa

Binomial name
- Rhadinastis phoenicopa Meyrick, 1907

Species of moth

Rhadinastis phoenicopa is a moth in the family Cosmopterigidae. It was described by Edward Meyrick in 1907. It is found in Sri Lanka.
