= Orthromicta =

Scientific classification
- Kingdom: Animalia
- Phylum: Arthropoda
- Class: Insecta
- Order: Lepidoptera
- Family: Cosmopterigidae
- Genus: Orthromicta; Meyrick, 1897

Genus of moths

Orthromicta is a genus of moth in the family Cosmopterigidae.

== Species ==
- Orthromicta argonota Turner, 1923
- Orthromicta galactitis Meyrick, 1897
- Orthromicta semifumea Turner, 1923
