= Trissodoris =

Scientific classification
- Domain: Eukaryota
- Kingdom: Animalia
- Phylum: Arthropoda
- Class: Insecta
- Order: Lepidoptera
- Family: Cosmopterigidae
- Subfamily: Cosmopteriginae
- Genus: Trissodoris; Meyrick, 1914

Genus of moths

Trissodoris is a genus of moth in the family Cosmopterigidae.

== Species ==
- Trissodoris euphaedra (Lower, 1904) (Australia)
- Trissodoris honorariella (Walsingham, 1907) (Australia, Japan, New Guinea, Pacific Islands, Sri Lanka)
- Trissodoris pansella Bradley, 1957 (Solomon Islands)
- Trissodoris thelma Clarke, 1971 (French Polynesia)
