= Trissodoris pansella =

Scientific classification
- Domain: Eukaryota
- Kingdom: Animalia
- Phylum: Arthropoda
- Class: Insecta
- Order: Lepidoptera
- Family: Cosmopterigidae
- Genus: Trissodoris
- Species: T. pansella

Binomial name
- Trissodoris pansella Bradley, 1957

Synonyms
- Trissodoris honorariella pansella Bradley, 1957

Species of moth

Trissodoris pansella is a moth in the family Cosmopterigidae. It is found on Rennell Island.
