= Macrobathra deltozona =

Scientific classification
- Kingdom: Animalia
- Phylum: Arthropoda
- Clade: Pancrustacea
- Class: Insecta
- Order: Lepidoptera
- Family: Cosmopterigidae
- Genus: Macrobathra
- Species: M. deltozona

Binomial name
- Macrobathra deltozona Meyrick, 1932

Species of moth

Macrobathra deltozona is a moth in the family Cosmopterigidae. It is found on Java.
