= Macrobathra crococephala =

Scientific classification
- Kingdom: Animalia
- Phylum: Arthropoda
- Clade: Pancrustacea
- Class: Insecta
- Order: Lepidoptera
- Family: Cosmopterigidae
- Genus: Macrobathra
- Species: M. crococephala

Binomial name
- Macrobathra crococephala Meyrick, 1936

Species of moth

Macrobathra crococephala is a moth in the family Cosmopterigidae. It was described by Edward Meyrick in 1936. It is found in the Democratic Republic of the Congo.
