= Glaphyristis =

Scientific classification
- Kingdom: Animalia
- Phylum: Arthropoda
- Class: Insecta
- Order: Lepidoptera
- Family: Cosmopterigidae
- Subfamily: Cosmopteriginae
- Genus: Glaphyristis; Meyrick, 1897

Genus of moths

Glaphyristis is a genus of moth in the family Cosmopterigidae.

== Species ==
- Glaphyristis lithinopa Meyrick, 1917
- Glaphyristis marmarea Meyrick, 1897
- Glaphyristis politicopa Meyrick, 1934
