= Macrobathra recrepans =

Scientific classification
- Kingdom: Animalia
- Phylum: Arthropoda
- Clade: Pancrustacea
- Class: Insecta
- Order: Lepidoptera
- Family: Cosmopterigidae
- Genus: Macrobathra
- Species: M. recrepans

Binomial name
- Macrobathra recrepans Meyrick, 1926

Species of moth

Macrobathra recrepans is a moth in the family Cosmopterigidae. It was described by Edward Meyrick in 1926. It is found in South Africa and Zimbabwe.
