= Sarotorna myrrhina =

Scientific classification
- Domain: Eukaryota
- Kingdom: Animalia
- Phylum: Arthropoda
- Class: Insecta
- Order: Lepidoptera
- Family: Gelechiidae
- Genus: Sarotorna
- Species: S. myrrhina

Binomial name
- Sarotorna myrrhina Turner, 1919

Species of moth

Sarotorna myrrhina is a moth of the family Gelechiidae. It was described by Turner in 1919. It is found in Australia, where it has been recorded from Queensland.

The wingspan is 12–18 mm. The forewings are pale ochreous fuscous with white, ill-defined markings. There is a broad sub-basal fascia and a dorsal suffusion confluent with the fascia, as well as an ill-defined costal mark at one-third and a more distinct inwardly-oblique curved line from five-sixths of the costa to the tornus. The hindwings are pale-grey.
