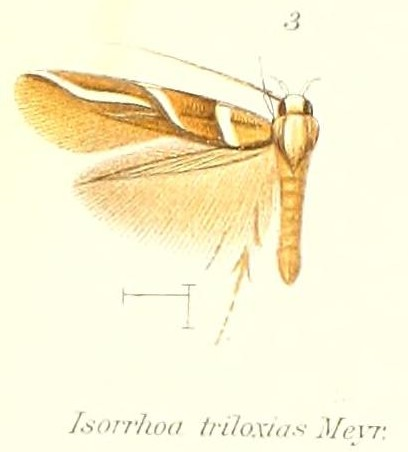

Scientific classification
- Kingdom: Animalia
- Phylum: Arthropoda
- Class: Insecta
- Order: Lepidoptera
- Family: Cosmopterigidae
- Genus: Isorrhoa
- Species: I. triloxias

Binomial name
- Isorrhoa triloxias Meyrick, 1907

= Isorrhoa triloxias =

Species of moth

Isorrhoa triloxias is a moth in the family Cosmopterigidae. It was described by Edward Meyrick in 1907. It is found in Sri Lanka.
