= Macrobathra pyrodoxa =

Scientific classification
- Kingdom: Animalia
- Phylum: Arthropoda
- Clade: Pancrustacea
- Class: Insecta
- Order: Lepidoptera
- Family: Cosmopterigidae
- Genus: Macrobathra
- Species: M. pyrodoxa

Binomial name
- Macrobathra pyrodoxa Meyrick, 1926

Species of moth

Macrobathra pyrodoxa is a moth in the family Cosmopterigidae. It is found on New Ireland.
