= Heureta =

Scientific classification
- Kingdom: Animalia
- Phylum: Arthropoda
- Class: Insecta
- Order: Lepidoptera
- Family: Cosmopterigidae
- Subfamily: Cosmopteriginae
- Genus: Heureta; Turner, 1932

Genus of moths

Heureta is a genus of moths in the family Cosmopterigidae.

== Species ==
- Heureta cirrhodora (Meyrick, 1915)
