= Sarotorna eridora =

Scientific classification
- Kingdom: Animalia
- Phylum: Arthropoda
- Class: Insecta
- Order: Lepidoptera
- Family: Gelechiidae
- Genus: Sarotorna
- Species: S. eridora

Binomial name
- Sarotorna eridora Meyrick, 1904

Species of moth

Sarotorna eridora is a moth of the family Gelechiidae. It was described by Edward Meyrick in 1904. It is found in Australia, where it has been recorded from New South Wales.

The wingspan is about 16 mm (0.63 in). The forewings are ochreous white with four moderate dark fuscous fasciae, the first subbasal, the second and third confluent on the costa in the middle, running to the middle of the dorsum and tornus respectively, the fourth from the costa before the apex to the termen. The hindwings are rather dark fuscous, lighter anteriorly.
