= Macrobathra neurocoma =

Scientific classification
- Kingdom: Animalia
- Phylum: Arthropoda
- Clade: Pancrustacea
- Class: Insecta
- Order: Lepidoptera
- Family: Cosmopterigidae
- Genus: Macrobathra
- Species: M. neurocoma

Binomial name
- Macrobathra neurocoma Meyrick, 1930

Species of moth

Macrobathra neurocoma is a moth in the family Cosmopterigidae. It is found in Cameroon.
