= Macrobathra antimeloda =

Scientific classification
- Kingdom: Animalia
- Phylum: Arthropoda
- Clade: Pancrustacea
- Class: Insecta
- Order: Lepidoptera
- Family: Cosmopterigidae
- Genus: Macrobathra
- Species: M. antimeloda

Binomial name
- Macrobathra antimeloda Meyrick, 1930

Species of moth

Macrobathra antimeloda is a moth in the family Cosmopterigidae. It is found in Madagascar.

Its forewings are dark fuscous with white markings and it has a wingspan of 15 mm.

== See also ==
- List of moths of Madagascar
