= Rhadinastis serpula =

Scientific classification
- Kingdom: Animalia
- Phylum: Arthropoda
- Class: Insecta
- Order: Lepidoptera
- Family: Cosmopterigidae
- Genus: Rhadinastis
- Species: R. serpula

Binomial name
- Rhadinastis serpula Meyrick, 1932

Species of moth

Rhadinastis serpula is a moth in the family Cosmopterigidae. It was described by Edward Meyrick in 1932. It is found in Taiwan.
