= Macrobathra proxena =

Scientific classification
- Kingdom: Animalia
- Phylum: Arthropoda
- Clade: Pancrustacea
- Class: Insecta
- Order: Lepidoptera
- Family: Cosmopterigidae
- Genus: Macrobathra
- Species: M. proxena

Binomial name
- Macrobathra proxena Meyrick, 1914

Species of moth

Macrobathra proxena is a moth in the family Cosmopterigidae. It was described by Edward Meyrick in 1914. It is found in Malawi.
