= Phaneroctena =

Scientific classification
- Kingdom: Animalia
- Phylum: Arthropoda
- Class: Insecta
- Order: Lepidoptera
- Family: Cosmopterigidae
- Subfamily: Cosmopteriginae
- Genus: Phaneroctena; Turner, 1923

Genus of moths

Phaneroctena is a genus of moths in the family Cosmopterigidae.

== Species ==
- Phaneroctena homopsara Turner, 1923
- Phaneroctena pentasticta Turner, 1923
- Phaneroctena spodopasta Turner, 1923
