= Macrobathra myrocoma =

Scientific classification
- Kingdom: Animalia
- Phylum: Arthropoda
- Clade: Pancrustacea
- Class: Insecta
- Order: Lepidoptera
- Family: Cosmopterigidae
- Genus: Macrobathra
- Species: M. myrocoma

Binomial name
- Macrobathra myrocoma Meyrick, 1914

Species of moth

Macrobathra myrocoma is a moth in the family Cosmopterigidae. It is found in India (Assam) and China.
