= Macrobathra fasciata =

Scientific classification
- Kingdom: Animalia
- Phylum: Arthropoda
- Clade: Pancrustacea
- Class: Insecta
- Order: Lepidoptera
- Family: Cosmopterigidae
- Genus: Macrobathra
- Species: M. fasciata

Binomial name
- Macrobathra fasciata (Walsingham, 1891)

Synonyms
- Stagmatophora fasciata Walsingham, 1891

Species of moth

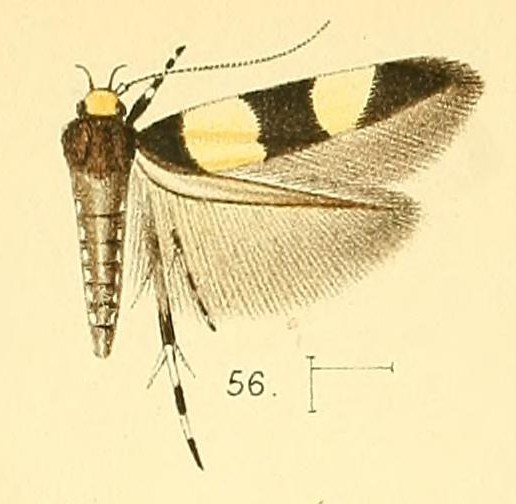
Macrobathra fasciata

Macrobathra fasciata is a moth in the family Cosmopterigidae. It was described by Walsingham in 1891. It is found in Namibia, South Africa, Gambia and Zimbabwe.
