= Isorrhoa antimetra =

Scientific classification
- Kingdom: Animalia
- Phylum: Arthropoda
- Class: Insecta
- Order: Lepidoptera
- Family: Cosmopterigidae
- Genus: Isorrhoa
- Species: I. antimetra

Binomial name
- Isorrhoa antimetra Meyrick, 1913

Species of moth

Isorrhoa antimetra is a moth in the family Cosmopterigidae. It was described by Edward Meyrick in 1913. It is found in India.
