= Macrobathra ochanota =

Scientific classification
- Kingdom: Animalia
- Phylum: Arthropoda
- Clade: Pancrustacea
- Class: Insecta
- Order: Lepidoptera
- Family: Cosmopterigidae
- Genus: Macrobathra
- Species: M. ochanota

Binomial name
- Macrobathra ochanota Meyrick, 1915

Species of moth

Macrobathra ochanota is a moth in the family Cosmopterigidae. It is found in southern India.
