= Macrobathra auratella =

Scientific classification
- Kingdom: Animalia
- Phylum: Arthropoda
- Clade: Pancrustacea
- Class: Insecta
- Order: Lepidoptera
- Family: Cosmopterigidae
- Genus: Macrobathra
- Species: M. auratella

Binomial name
- Macrobathra auratella Viette, 1958

Species of moth

Macrobathra auratella is a moth in the family Cosmopterigidae. It was described by Viette in 1958. It is found in Madagascar.
