= Macrobathra distincta =

Scientific classification
- Kingdom: Animalia
- Phylum: Arthropoda
- Clade: Pancrustacea
- Class: Insecta
- Order: Lepidoptera
- Family: Cosmopterigidae
- Genus: Macrobathra
- Species: M. distincta

Binomial name
- Macrobathra distincta (Walsingham, 1891)

Synonyms
- Stagmatophora distincta Walsingham, 1891

Species of moth

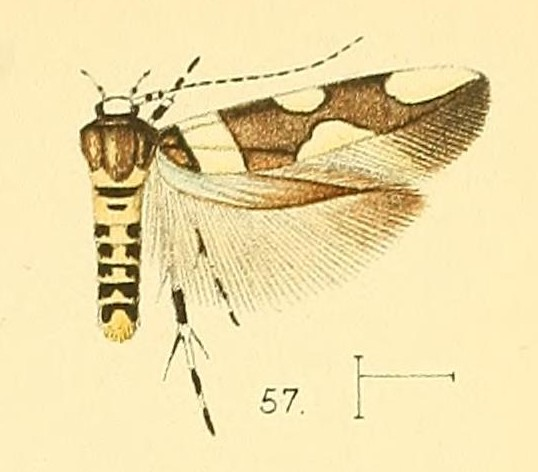
Macrobathra distincta

Macrobathra distincta is a moth in the family Cosmopterigidae. It was described by Walsingham in 1891. It is found in Gambia.
