= Sarotorna stenodes =

Scientific classification
- Domain: Eukaryota
- Kingdom: Animalia
- Phylum: Arthropoda
- Class: Insecta
- Order: Lepidoptera
- Family: Gelechiidae
- Genus: Sarotorna
- Species: S. stenodes

Binomial name
- Sarotorna stenodes (Turner, 1936)

Synonyms
- Macronemata stenodes Turner, 1936; Eulechria stenodes

Species of moth

Sarotorna stenodes is a moth of the family Gelechiidae. It was described by Turner in 1936. It is found in Australia, where it has been recorded from Western Australia.

The wingspan is about 12 mm. The forewings are white with dark fuscous markings. There is an oblique fascia from beneath one-third of the costa to above the base of the dorsum and another from two-thirds of the costa to the mid-dorsum. A third is found from two-thirds of the costa to the tornus. There is also an apical blotch. The hindwings are pale grey.
