= Macrobathra superharpalea =

Scientific classification
- Kingdom: Animalia
- Phylum: Arthropoda
- Clade: Pancrustacea
- Class: Insecta
- Order: Lepidoptera
- Family: Cosmopterigidae
- Genus: Macrobathra
- Species: M. superharpalea

Binomial name
- Macrobathra superharpalea (Legrand, 1966)

Synonyms
- Limnaecia superharpalea Legrand, 1966

Species of moth

Macrobathra superharpalea is a moth in the family Cosmopterigidae. It is found on the Seychelles.
