= Glaphyristis politicopa =

Scientific classification
- Kingdom: Animalia
- Phylum: Arthropoda
- Class: Insecta
- Order: Lepidoptera
- Family: Cosmopterigidae
- Genus: Glaphyristis
- Species: G. politicopa

Binomial name
- Glaphyristis politicopa Meyrick, 1934

Species of moth

Glaphyristis politicopa is a moth in the family Cosmopterigidae. It is found on Fiji.
