= Macrobathra cineralella =

Scientific classification
- Kingdom: Animalia
- Phylum: Arthropoda
- Clade: Pancrustacea
- Class: Insecta
- Order: Lepidoptera
- Family: Cosmopterigidae
- Genus: Macrobathra
- Species: M. cineralella

Binomial name
- Macrobathra cineralella Viette, 1957

Species of moth

Macrobathra cineralella is a moth in the family Cosmopterigidae. It is found on the Indian Ocean island of Réunion.
