= Sarotorna mesoleuca =

Scientific classification
- Domain: Eukaryota
- Kingdom: Animalia
- Phylum: Arthropoda
- Class: Insecta
- Order: Lepidoptera
- Family: Gelechiidae
- Genus: Sarotorna
- Species: S. mesoleuca

Binomial name
- Sarotorna mesoleuca (Lower, 1900)

Synonyms
- Gelechia mesoleuca Lower, 1900; Athrips mesoleuca; Nothris dentata Lower, 1897; Xerometra dentata

Species of moth

Sarotorna mesoleuca is a moth of the family Gelechiidae. It is found in Australia, where it has been recorded from New South Wales and Victoria.

The wingspan is 14–16 mm (0.55–0.63 in). The forewings are dark golden-bronzy-fuscous with a rather broad white longitudinal streak above the middle from the base to the apex, posteriorly suffusedly dilated to reach the costa, the lower edge with irregular blackish indentations before and beyond the middle, the first triangular, the second rounded, representing the discal stigmata. The plical stigmata are elongate, suffused, blackish and very obliquely before the first discal. A rather broad dorsal streak of white suffusion is found from the base to the tornus, sometimes little marked. The hindwings are grey.
