= Macrobathra notomitra =

Scientific classification
- Kingdom: Animalia
- Phylum: Arthropoda
- Clade: Pancrustacea
- Class: Insecta
- Order: Lepidoptera
- Family: Cosmopterigidae
- Genus: Macrobathra
- Species: M. notomitra

Binomial name
- Macrobathra notomitra Meyrick, 1924

Species of moth

Macrobathra notomitra is a moth in the family Cosmopterigidae. It is found in India.
