= Mimodoxa =

Scientific classification
- Kingdom: Animalia
- Phylum: Arthropoda
- Class: Insecta
- Order: Lepidoptera
- Family: Cosmopterigidae
- Subfamily: Cosmopteriginae
- Genus: Mimodoxa; Lower, 1901

Genus of moths

Mimodoxa is a genus of moths in the family Cosmopterigidae.

== Species ==
- Mimodoxa dryina Lower, 1901
- Mimodoxa empyrophanes Turner, 1932
- Mimodoxa loxospila Turner, 1932
- Mimodoxa metallica (Lower, 1899)
- Mimodoxa phaulophanes Turner, 1932
- Mimodoxa tricommatica Turner, 1932
