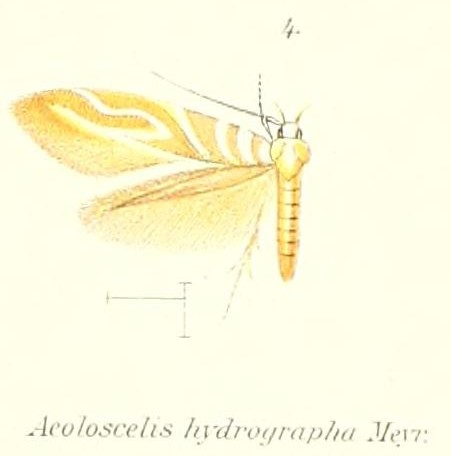
- Isorrhoa aetheria

Scientific classification
- Kingdom: Animalia
- Phylum: Arthropoda
- Class: Insecta
- Order: Lepidoptera
- Family: Cosmopterigidae
- Subfamily: Cosmopteriginae
- Genus: Isorrhoa; Meyrick, 1913

= Isorrhoa =

Genus of moths

Isorrhoa is a genus of moths in the family Cosmopterigidae.

== Species ==
- Isorrhoa aetheria (Meyrick, 1897)
- Isorrhoa ancistrota (Turner, 1923)
- Isorrhoa antimetra Meyrick, 1913
- Isorrhoa aphrosema (Meyrick, 1897)
- Isorrhoa atmozona Turner, 1917
- Isorrhoa implicata Meyrick, 1920
- Isorrhoa loxoschema Turner, 1923
- Isorrhoa triloxias (Meyrick, 1907)
