= Rhadinastis =

Scientific classification
- Kingdom: Animalia
- Phylum: Arthropoda
- Class: Insecta
- Order: Lepidoptera
- Family: Cosmopterigidae
- Subfamily: Cosmopteriginae
- Genus: Rhadinastis; Meyrick, 1897

Genus of moths

Rhadinastis is a genus of moth in the family Cosmopterigidae.

== Species ==
- Rhadinastis loraria Meyrick, 1917
- Rhadinastis melitocosma Meyrick, 1931
- Rhadinastis microlychna Meyrick, 1897
- Rhadinastis phoenicopa Meyrick, 1907
- Rhadinastis serpula Meyrick, 1932
- Rhadinastis sideropa Meyrick, 1897
