= Sarotorna =

Scientific classification
- Domain: Eukaryota
- Kingdom: Animalia
- Phylum: Arthropoda
- Class: Insecta
- Order: Lepidoptera
- Family: Gelechiidae
- Tribe: Gelechiini
- Genus: Sarotorna; Meyrick, 1904

Genus of moths

Sarotorna is a genus of moths in the family Gelechiidae.

== Species ==
- Sarotorna epipona (Meyrick, 1902)
- Sarotorna eridora Meyrick, 1904
- Sarotorna mesoleuca (Lower, 1900)
- Sarotorna myrrhina Turner, 1919
- Sarotorna stenodes (Turner, 1936)
