= Trissodoris thelma =

Scientific classification
- Domain: Eukaryota
- Kingdom: Animalia
- Phylum: Arthropoda
- Class: Insecta
- Order: Lepidoptera
- Family: Cosmopterigidae
- Genus: Trissodoris
- Species: T. thelma

Binomial name
- Trissodoris thelma Clarke, 1971

Species of moth

Trissodoris thelma is a moth in the family Cosmopterigidae. It is found in Rapa Iti.
