= Macrobathra peraeota =

Scientific classification
- Kingdom: Animalia
- Phylum: Arthropoda
- Clade: Pancrustacea
- Class: Insecta
- Order: Lepidoptera
- Family: Cosmopterigidae
- Genus: Macrobathra
- Species: M. peraeota

Binomial name
- Macrobathra peraeota Meyrick, 1921

Species of moth

Macrobathra peraeota is a moth in the family Cosmopterigidae. It was described by Edward Meyrick in 1921. It is found in Mozambique.
