= Macrobathra latipterophora =

Scientific classification
- Kingdom: Animalia
- Phylum: Arthropoda
- Clade: Pancrustacea
- Class: Insecta
- Order: Lepidoptera
- Family: Cosmopterigidae
- Genus: Macrobathra
- Species: M. latipterophora

Binomial name
- Macrobathra latipterophora H.H. Li & X.P. Wang, 2004

Species of moth

Macrobathra latipterophora is a moth in the family Cosmopterigidae. It was described by H.H. Li and X.P. Wang in 2004. It is found in China (Hubei).
