= Paratheta =

Scientific classification
- Kingdom: Animalia
- Phylum: Arthropoda
- Class: Insecta
- Order: Lepidoptera
- Family: Cosmopterigidae
- Genus: Paratheta; Lower, 1899

Synonyms
- Mixodetis Meyrick, 1902

Genus of moths

Paratheta is a genus of moths in the family Cosmopterigidae.

== Species ==
- Paratheta calyptra Lower, 1899
- Paratheta lasiomela Lower, 1899
- Paratheta ochrocoma Lower, 1899
