= Macrobathra flavidus =

Scientific classification
- Kingdom: Animalia
- Phylum: Arthropoda
- Clade: Pancrustacea
- Class: Insecta
- Order: Lepidoptera
- Family: Cosmopterigidae
- Genus: Macrobathra
- Species: M. flavidus

Binomial name
- Macrobathra flavidus F.J. Qian & Y.Q. Liu, 1997

Species of moth

Macrobathra flavidus is a moth in the family Cosmopterigidae. It was described by F.J. Qian and Y.Q. Liu in 1997. It is found in China.

The larvae feed on Cunninghamia lanceolata. They bore into the cone and seeds of their host plant.
