= Macrobathra sikoraella =

Scientific classification
- Kingdom: Animalia
- Phylum: Arthropoda
- Clade: Pancrustacea
- Class: Insecta
- Order: Lepidoptera
- Family: Cosmopterigidae
- Genus: Macrobathra
- Species: M. sikoraella

Binomial name
- Macrobathra sikoraella (Viette, 1956)

Synonyms
- Pauroptila sikoraella Viette, 1956

Species of moth

Macrobathra sikoraella is a moth in the family Cosmopterigidae. It was described by Pierre Viette in 1956. It is found in Madagascar.
