= Otonoma =

Scientific classification
- Kingdom: Animalia
- Phylum: Arthropoda
- Class: Insecta
- Order: Lepidoptera
- Family: Cosmopterigidae
- Subfamily: Cosmopteriginae
- Genus: Otonoma; Meyrick, 1897

Genus of moths

Otonoma is a genus of moth in the family Cosmopterigidae.

== Species ==
- Otonoma anemois Meyrick, 1897
- Otonoma leucochlaena Meyrick, 1919
- Otonoma sophronica Meyrick, 1920
- Otonoma sphenosema (Meyrick, 1897)
