= Macrobathra quercea =

Scientific classification
- Kingdom: Animalia
- Phylum: Arthropoda
- Clade: Pancrustacea
- Class: Insecta
- Order: Lepidoptera
- Family: Cosmopterigidae
- Genus: Macrobathra
- Species: M. quercea

Binomial name
- Macrobathra quercea Moriuti, 1973

Species of moth

Macrobathra quercea is a moth in the family Cosmopterigidae. It was described by Sigeru Moriuti in 1973. It is found in Japan and China.

The wingspan is 13–16 mm.

The larvae have been recorded feeding on Quercus serrata and Quercus glauca.
