= Macrobathra hamaxitodes =

Scientific classification
- Kingdom: Animalia
- Phylum: Arthropoda
- Clade: Pancrustacea
- Class: Insecta
- Order: Lepidoptera
- Family: Cosmopterigidae
- Genus: Macrobathra
- Species: M. hamaxitodes

Binomial name
- Macrobathra hamaxitodes Meyrick, 1886

Synonyms
- Macrobathra unguinosa Turner, 1932

Species of moth

Macrobathra hamaxitodes is a moth in the family Cosmopterigidae. It was described by Edward Meyrick in 1886. It is found in Australia, where it has been recorded from New South Wales and Queensland.
