= Macrobathra rubicundella =

Scientific classification
- Kingdom: Animalia
- Phylum: Arthropoda
- Clade: Pancrustacea
- Class: Insecta
- Order: Lepidoptera
- Family: Cosmopterigidae
- Genus: Macrobathra
- Species: M. rubicundella

Binomial name
- Macrobathra rubicundella (Walker, 1864)

Synonyms
- Gelechia rubicundella Walker, 1864; Macrobathra rosea Turner, 1896

Species of moth

Macrobathra rubicundella is a moth in the family Cosmopterigidae. It was described by Francis Walker in 1864. It is found in Australia, where it has been recorded from Queensland.
