= Macrobathra vexillariata =

Scientific classification
- Kingdom: Animalia
- Phylum: Arthropoda
- Clade: Pancrustacea
- Class: Insecta
- Order: Lepidoptera
- Family: Cosmopterigidae
- Genus: Macrobathra
- Species: M. vexillariata

Binomial name
- Macrobathra vexillariata T. P. Lucas, 1901

Species of moth

Macrobathra vexillariata is a moth in the family Cosmopterigidae. It was described by Thomas Pennington Lucas in 1901. It is found in Australia, where it has been recorded from Queensland.
