= Sarotorna epipona =

Scientific classification
- Kingdom: Animalia
- Phylum: Arthropoda
- Class: Insecta
- Order: Lepidoptera
- Family: Gelechiidae
- Genus: Sarotorna
- Species: S. epipona

Binomial name
- Sarotorna epipona (Meyrick, 1902)

Synonyms
- Trachyntis epipona Meyrick, 1902; Macrobathra centrosphena Turner, 1932

Species of moth

Sarotorna epipona is a moth of the family Gelechiidae. It was described by Edward Meyrick in 1904. It is found in Australia, where it has been recorded from New South Wales and Western Australia.

The wingspan is 16–18 mm. The forewings are grey with dark fuscous markings. There is a slender transverse sub-basal fascia and a transverse wedge from the mid-dorsum moderately broad at the base, narrowing to an apex just below one-third of the costa. There is also a moderate fascia from two-thirds of the costa to the tornus, suffused at the extremities. The hindwings are grey.
