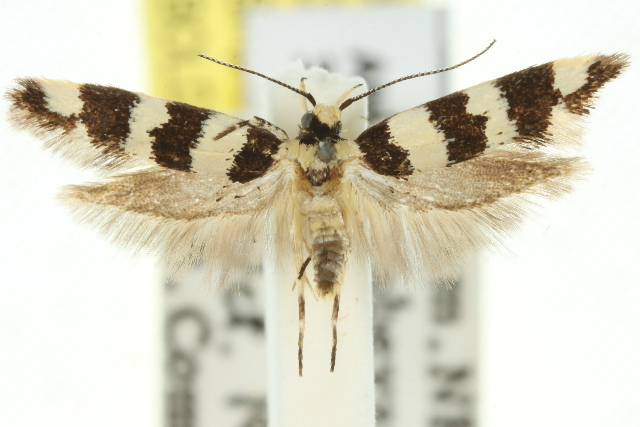

Scientific classification
- Kingdom: Animalia
- Phylum: Arthropoda
- Clade: Pancrustacea
- Class: Insecta
- Order: Lepidoptera
- Family: Cosmopterigidae
- Genus: Macrobathra
- Species: M. platychroa

Binomial name
- Macrobathra platychroa Lower, 1897

= Macrobathra platychroa =

Species of moth

Macrobathra platychroa is a moth in the family Cosmopterigidae. It was described by Oswald Bertram Lower in 1897. It is found in Australia, where it has been recorded from Victoria.
