= Orthromicta argonota =

Scientific classification
- Kingdom: Animalia
- Phylum: Arthropoda
- Class: Insecta
- Order: Lepidoptera
- Family: Cosmopterigidae
- Genus: Orthromicta
- Species: O. argonota

Binomial name
- Orthromicta argonota Turner, 1923

Species of moth

Orthromicta argonota is a moth in the family Cosmopterigidae. It is found in Australia, where it has been recorded from Queensland.
