= Cosmopterix mystica =

Scientific classification
- Kingdom: Animalia
- Phylum: Arthropoda
- Class: Insecta
- Order: Lepidoptera
- Family: Cosmopterigidae
- Genus: Cosmopterix
- Species: C. mystica

Binomial name
- Cosmopterix mystica (Meyrick, 1897)

Synonyms
- Cosmopteryx mystica Meyrick, 1897

Species of moth

Cosmopterix mystica is a moth of the family Cosmopterigidae. It is from Australia.
