= Isorrhoa atmozona =

Scientific classification
- Kingdom: Animalia
- Phylum: Arthropoda
- Class: Insecta
- Order: Lepidoptera
- Family: Cosmopterigidae
- Genus: Isorrhoa
- Species: I. atmozona

Binomial name
- Isorrhoa atmozona Turner, 1917

Species of moth

Isorrhoa atmozona is a moth in the family Cosmopterigidae. It was described by Alfred Jefferis Turner in 1917. It is found in Australia.
