= Cosmopterix isoteles =

Scientific classification
- Kingdom: Animalia
- Phylum: Arthropoda
- Class: Insecta
- Order: Lepidoptera
- Family: Cosmopterigidae
- Genus: Cosmopterix
- Species: C. isoteles

Binomial name
- Cosmopterix isoteles (Meyrick, 1919)

Synonyms
- Cosmopteryx isoteles Meyrick, 1919

Species of moth

Cosmopterix isoteles is a moth of the family Cosmopterigidae. It is known from Australia.
