= Macrobathra isoscelana =

Scientific classification
- Kingdom: Animalia
- Phylum: Arthropoda
- Clade: Pancrustacea
- Class: Insecta
- Order: Lepidoptera
- Family: Cosmopterigidae
- Genus: Macrobathra
- Species: M. isoscelana

Binomial name
- Macrobathra isoscelana Lower, 1893

Species of moth

Macrobathra isoscelana is a moth in the family Cosmopterigidae. It was described by Oswald Bertram Lower in 1893. It is found in Australia, where it has been recorded from South Australia.
