= Macrobathra heterocera =

Scientific classification
- Kingdom: Animalia
- Phylum: Arthropoda
- Clade: Pancrustacea
- Class: Insecta
- Order: Lepidoptera
- Family: Cosmopterigidae
- Genus: Macrobathra
- Species: M. heterocera

Binomial name
- Macrobathra heterocera Lower, 1894

Species of moth

Macrobathra heterocera is a moth in the family Cosmopterigidae. It was described by Oswald Bertram Lower in 1894. It is found in Australia, where it has been recorded from Tasmania.
