= Macrobathra asemanta =

Scientific classification
- Kingdom: Animalia
- Phylum: Arthropoda
- Clade: Pancrustacea
- Class: Insecta
- Order: Lepidoptera
- Family: Cosmopterigidae
- Genus: Macrobathra
- Species: M. asemanta

Binomial name
- Macrobathra asemanta Lower, 1894

Species of moth

Macrobathra asemanta is a moth in the family Cosmopterigidae. It was described by Oswald Bertram Lower in 1894. It was initially found in Australia, where its presence was confirmed in Tasmania.
