= Cosmopterix aculeata =

Scientific classification
- Kingdom: Animalia
- Phylum: Arthropoda
- Class: Insecta
- Order: Lepidoptera
- Family: Cosmopterigidae
- Genus: Cosmopterix
- Species: C. aculeata

Binomial name
- Cosmopterix aculeata Meyrick, 1909

Species of moth from Asia and Australia

Cosmopterix aculeata is a moth of the family Cosmopterigidae. It is known from India (Assam), China and Australia.

It is multivoltine, with adults recorded from March to November.
