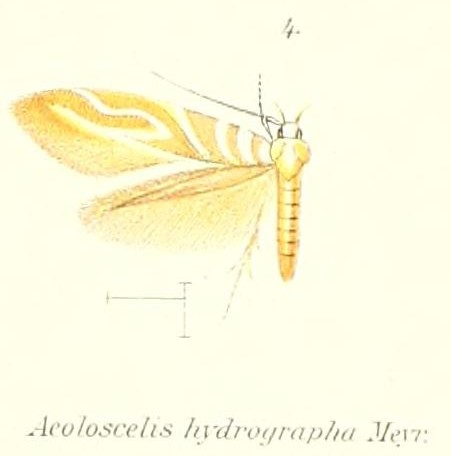

Scientific classification
- Kingdom: Animalia
- Phylum: Arthropoda
- Class: Insecta
- Order: Lepidoptera
- Family: Cosmopterigidae
- Genus: Isorrhoa
- Species: I. aetheria

Binomial name
- Isorrhoa aetheria (Meyrick, 1897)

Synonyms
- Aeoloscelis aetheria Meyrick, 1897; Aeoloscelis hydrographa Meyrick, 1897

= Isorrhoa aetheria =

Species of moth

Isorrhoa aetheria is a moth in the family Cosmopterigidae. It was described by Edward Meyrick in 1897. It is found in Australia.
