= Macrobathra nomaea =

Scientific classification
- Kingdom: Animalia
- Phylum: Arthropoda
- Clade: Pancrustacea
- Class: Insecta
- Order: Lepidoptera
- Family: Cosmopterigidae
- Genus: Macrobathra
- Species: M. nomaea

Binomial name
- Macrobathra nomaea Meyrick, 1914

Species of moth

Macrobathra nomaea is a moth in the family Cosmopterigidae. It is found in Australia, where it has been recorded from Queensland.
