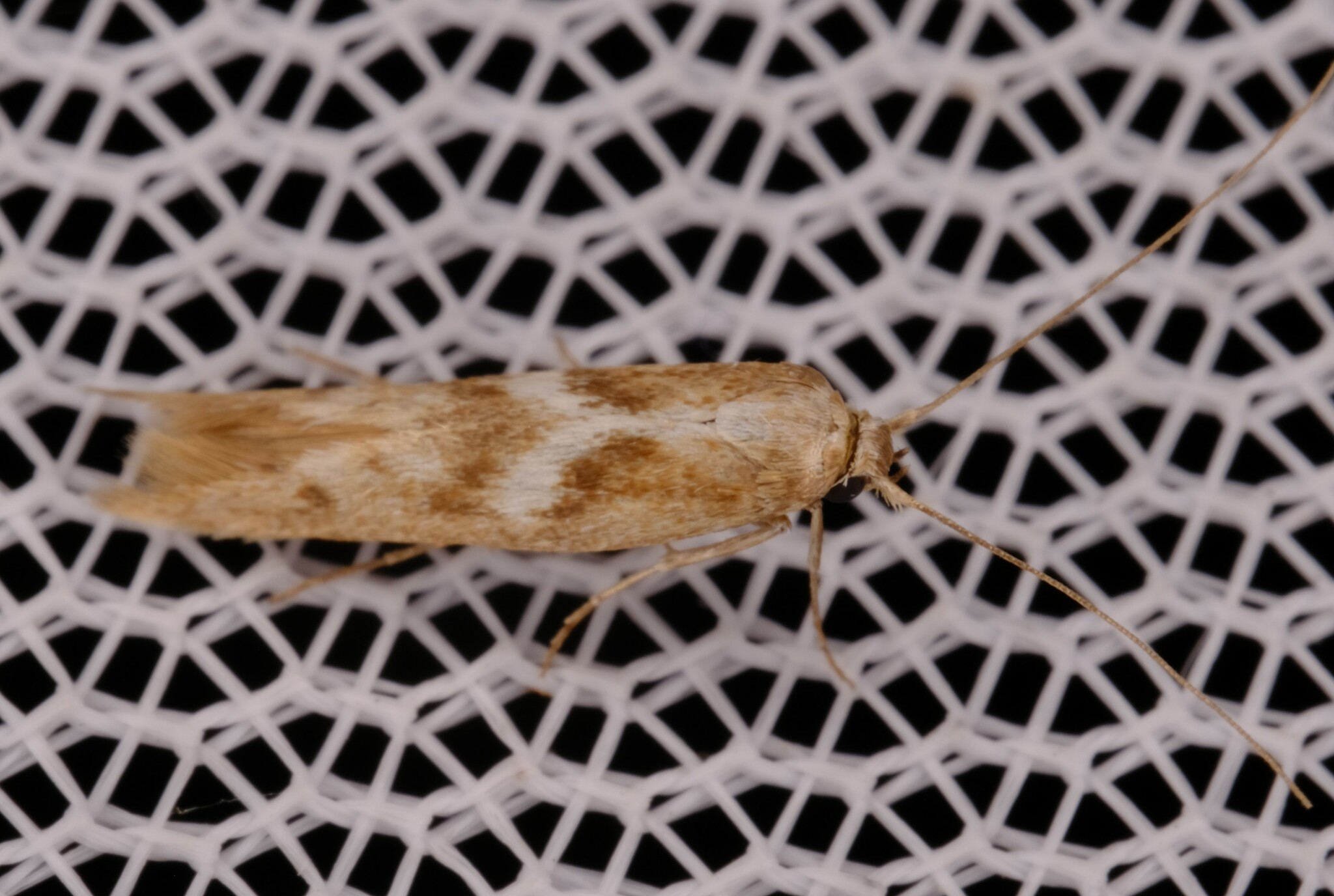

Scientific classification
- Domain: Eukaryota
- Kingdom: Animalia
- Phylum: Arthropoda
- Class: Insecta
- Order: Lepidoptera
- Family: Cosmopterigidae
- Genus: Paratheta
- Species: P. calyptra

Binomial name
- Paratheta calyptra Lower, 1899

= Paratheta calyptra =

Species of moth

Paratheta calyptra is a species of moth in the family Cosmopterigidae. It was described by Oswald Bertram Lower in 1899. It is found in Australia, where it has been recorded from New South Wales.
