= Isorrhoa aphrosema =

Scientific classification
- Kingdom: Animalia
- Phylum: Arthropoda
- Class: Insecta
- Order: Lepidoptera
- Family: Cosmopterigidae
- Genus: Isorrhoa
- Species: I. aphrosema

Binomial name
- Isorrhoa aphrosema (Meyrick, 1897)

Synonyms
- Persicoptila aphrosema Meyrick, 1897; Isorrhoa emplecta Turner, 1926

Species of moth

Isorrhoa aphrosema is a moth in the family Cosmopterigidae. It was described by Edward Meyrick in 1897. It is found in Australia, where it has been recorded from Queensland.
