= Macrobathra nephelomorpha =

Scientific classification
- Kingdom: Animalia
- Phylum: Arthropoda
- Clade: Pancrustacea
- Class: Insecta
- Order: Lepidoptera
- Family: Cosmopterigidae
- Genus: Macrobathra
- Species: M. nephelomorpha

Binomial name
- Macrobathra nephelomorpha Meyrick, 1886

Species of moth

Macrobathra nephelomorpha is a moth in the family Cosmopterigidae. It was described by Edward Meyrick in 1886. It is found in Australia, where it has been recorded from the eastern part of the country and Tasmania.
