= Mimodoxa loxospila =

Scientific classification
- Domain: Eukaryota
- Kingdom: Animalia
- Phylum: Arthropoda
- Class: Insecta
- Order: Lepidoptera
- Family: Cosmopterigidae
- Genus: Mimodoxa
- Species: M. loxospila

Binomial name
- Mimodoxa loxospila Turner, 1932

Species of moth

Mimodoxa loxospila is a moth in the family Cosmopterigidae. It was described by Turner in 1932. It is found in Australia, where it has been recorded from New South Wales.
