= Macrobathra basisticha =

Scientific classification
- Kingdom: Animalia
- Phylum: Arthropoda
- Clade: Pancrustacea
- Class: Insecta
- Order: Lepidoptera
- Family: Cosmopterigidae
- Genus: Macrobathra
- Species: M. basisticha

Binomial name
- Macrobathra basisticha (Turner, 1936)

Synonyms
- Macronemata basisticha Turner, 1936

Species of moth

Macrobathra basisticha is a moth in the family Cosmopterigidae. It was described by Turner in 1936. It is found in Australia, where it has been recorded from Queensland.
