= Macrobathra xanthoplaca =

Scientific classification
- Kingdom: Animalia
- Phylum: Arthropoda
- Clade: Pancrustacea
- Class: Insecta
- Order: Lepidoptera
- Family: Cosmopterigidae
- Genus: Macrobathra
- Species: M. xanthoplaca

Binomial name
- Macrobathra xanthoplaca Meyrick, 1902

Species of moth

Macrobathra xanthoplaca is a moth in the family Cosmopterigidae. It was described by Edward Meyrick in 1902. It is found in Australia, where it has been recorded from Victoria.
