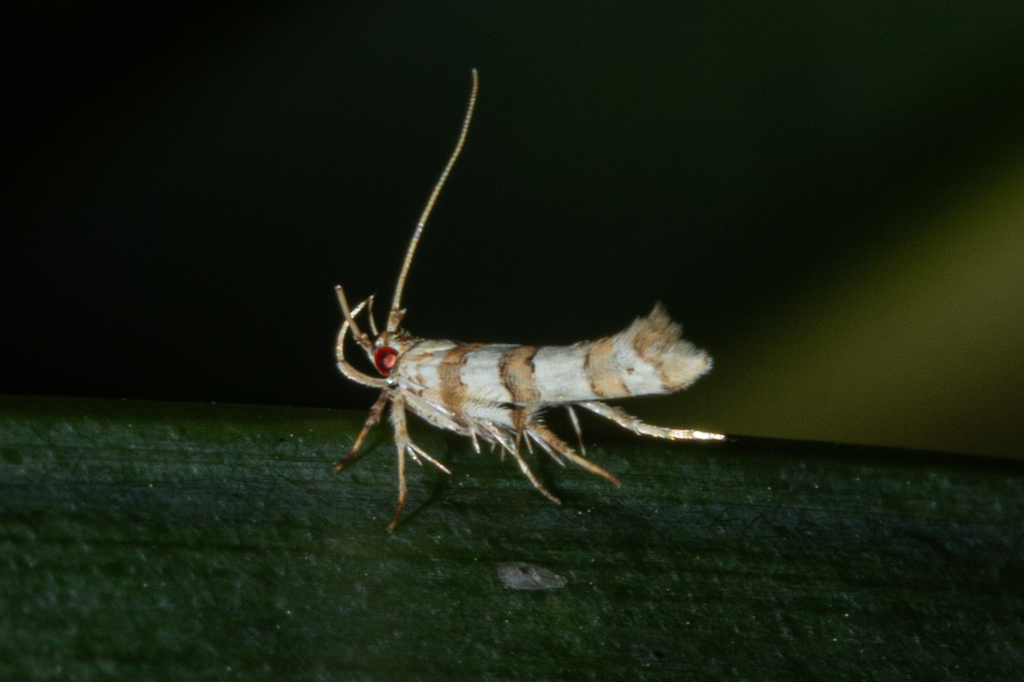

Scientific classification
- Kingdom: Animalia
- Phylum: Arthropoda
- Clade: Pancrustacea
- Class: Insecta
- Order: Lepidoptera
- Family: Cosmopterigidae
- Genus: Trissodoris
- Species: T. honorariella

Binomial name
- Trissodoris honorariella (Walsingham, 1907)

Synonyms
- Stagmatophora honorariella Walsingham, 1907; Stagmatophora quadrifasciata Walsingham, 1907; Trissodoris honorielle (lapsus); Trissodoris quadrifasciata (Walsingham, 1907)

= Trissodoris honorariella =

Pandanus leaf perforator

Species of moth

Trissodoris honorariella, the pandanus leaf perforator or pandanus hole-cutter moth, is a small cosmet moth species (family Cosmopterigidae). It belongs to subfamily Cosmopteriginae and is the type species of the genus Trissodoris. Baron Thomas Walsingham in 1907 had specimens from both ends of the species' range – New Guinea and Pitcairn Island – which he described as separate species Stagmatophora honorariella and S. quadrifasciata in the same work. But his mistake was soon recognized, and when Edward Meyrick established the genus Trissodoris in 1914, he chose the former name to be valid.

Like many related cosmet moths, this species has a short scape which bears a comb of hairs. They can be distinguished except from closely related species by their wing venation: in the forewings, vein 1b is not forked and veins 2–4 are separate, while veins 6–8 are not; the 6th and 7th veins branch off from the stalk of the 8th, while in some related genera the 7th and 8th share a single stalk.

== Distribution and ecology ==
This moth is found all over the Pacific region. Its north- to southwestern limits are Japan, the Caroline Islands of Micronesia, New Guinea and eastern Australia; the reports from the Malay Archipelago (Buru in Indonesia and Sarawak in Malaysian Borneo) and particularly Sri Lanka probably represent more recent introductions or accidental records. But most of its range encompasses Polynesia and adjacent Melanesia, where it is found on the New Hebrides, Fiji, the Samoan Islands, Tahiti and perhaps other Society Islands, Pitcairn Island, Rapa Iti, and the Hawaiian Islands (where it is found on Kauaʻi, Oʻahu, Molokaʻi, Maui, Lanaʻi and the Big Island). It is found mostly in the lowlands, where its food plants grow best.

The caterpillar larvae feed on Pandanus species, including Pandanus tectorius.
