= Macrobathra epimela =

Scientific classification
- Kingdom: Animalia
- Phylum: Arthropoda
- Clade: Pancrustacea
- Class: Insecta
- Order: Lepidoptera
- Family: Cosmopterigidae
- Genus: Macrobathra
- Species: M. epimela

Binomial name
- Macrobathra epimela (Lower, 1894)

Synonyms
- Gelechia epimela Lower, 1894

Species of moth

Macrobathra epimela is a moth in the family Cosmopterigidae. It was described by Oswald Bertram Lower in 1894. It is found in Australia, where it has been recorded from South Australia.
