= Mimodoxa tricommatica =

Scientific classification
- Domain: Eukaryota
- Kingdom: Animalia
- Phylum: Arthropoda
- Class: Insecta
- Order: Lepidoptera
- Family: Cosmopterigidae
- Genus: Mimodoxa
- Species: M. tricommatica

Binomial name
- Mimodoxa tricommatica Turner, 1932

Species of moth

Mimodoxa tricommatica is a moth in the family Cosmopterigidae. It was described by Turner in 1932. It is found in Australia, where it has been recorded from New South Wales.
