= Cosmopterix phaesphora =

Scientific classification
- Kingdom: Animalia
- Phylum: Arthropoda
- Class: Insecta
- Order: Lepidoptera
- Family: Cosmopterigidae
- Genus: Cosmopterix
- Species: C. phaesphora

Binomial name
- Cosmopterix phaesphora (Turner, 1923)

Synonyms
- Cosmopteryx phaesphora Turner, 1923

Species of moth

Cosmopterix phaesphora is a moth of the family Cosmopterigidae. It is known from Australia.
