= Macrobathra honoratella =

Scientific classification
- Kingdom: Animalia
- Phylum: Arthropoda
- Clade: Pancrustacea
- Class: Insecta
- Order: Lepidoptera
- Family: Cosmopterigidae
- Genus: Macrobathra
- Species: M. honoratella

Binomial name
- Macrobathra honoratella (Walker, 1864)

Synonyms
- Oecophora honoratella Walker, 1864; Macrobathra chlorosoma Meyrick, 1886

Species of moth

Macrobathra honoratella is a moth in the family Cosmopterigidae. It was described by Francis Walker in 1864. It is found in Australia, where it has been recorded from Queensland.
