= Macrobathra porphyrea =

Scientific classification
- Kingdom: Animalia
- Phylum: Arthropoda
- Clade: Pancrustacea
- Class: Insecta
- Order: Lepidoptera
- Family: Cosmopterigidae
- Genus: Macrobathra
- Species: M. porphyrea

Binomial name
- Macrobathra porphyrea Meyrick, 1886

Species of moth

Macrobathra porphyrea is a moth in the family Cosmopterigidae. It was described by Edward Meyrick in 1886. It is found in Australia, where it has been recorded from New South Wales.
