= Mimodoxa dryina =

Scientific classification
- Domain: Eukaryota
- Kingdom: Animalia
- Phylum: Arthropoda
- Class: Insecta
- Order: Lepidoptera
- Family: Cosmopterigidae
- Genus: Mimodoxa
- Species: M. dryina

Binomial name
- Mimodoxa dryina Lower, 1901

Species of moth

Mimodoxa dryina is a moth in the family Cosmopterigidae. It was described by Oswald Bertram Lower in 1901. It is found in eastern Australia.
