= Macrobathra vividella =

Scientific classification
- Kingdom: Animalia
- Phylum: Arthropoda
- Clade: Pancrustacea
- Class: Insecta
- Order: Lepidoptera
- Family: Cosmopterigidae
- Genus: Macrobathra
- Species: M. vividella

Binomial name
- Macrobathra vividella (C. Felder, R. Felder & Rogenhofer, 1875)

Synonyms
- Laverna vividella Felder, & Rogenhofer, 1875

Species of moth

Macrobathra vividella is a moth in the family Cosmopterigidae. It was described by Cajetan Felder, Rudolf Felder and Alois Friedrich Rogenhofer in 1875. It is found in Australia.
