= Rhadinastis sideropa =

Scientific classification
- Kingdom: Animalia
- Phylum: Arthropoda
- Class: Insecta
- Order: Lepidoptera
- Family: Cosmopterigidae
- Genus: Rhadinastis
- Species: R. sideropa

Binomial name
- Rhadinastis sideropa Meyrick, 1897

Species of moth

Rhadinastis sideropa is a moth in the family Cosmopterigidae. It was described by Edward Meyrick in 1897. It is found in Australia, where it has been recorded from Tasmania.
