= Mimodoxa phaulophanes =

Scientific classification
- Kingdom: Animalia
- Phylum: Arthropoda
- Clade: Pancrustacea
- Class: Insecta
- Order: Lepidoptera
- Family: Cosmopterigidae
- Genus: Mimodoxa
- Species: M. phaulophanes

Binomial name
- Mimodoxa phaulophanes Turner, 1932

Species of moth

Mimodoxa phaulophanes is a moth in the family Cosmopterigidae. It was described by Alfred Turner in 1932. It is found in Australia, where it has been recorded from New South Wales.
