= Macrobathra constrictella =

Scientific classification
- Kingdom: Animalia
- Phylum: Arthropoda
- Clade: Pancrustacea
- Class: Insecta
- Order: Lepidoptera
- Family: Cosmopterigidae
- Genus: Macrobathra
- Species: M. constrictella

Binomial name
- Macrobathra constrictella (Walker, 1864)

Synonyms
- Gelechia constrictella Walker, 1864

Species of moth

Macrobathra constrictella is a moth in the family Cosmopterigidae. It was described by Francis Walker in 1864. It is found in Australia.
