= Isorrhoa ancistrota =

Scientific classification
- Kingdom: Animalia
- Phylum: Arthropoda
- Class: Insecta
- Order: Lepidoptera
- Family: Cosmopterigidae
- Genus: Isorrhoa
- Species: I. ancistrota

Binomial name
- Isorrhoa ancistrota (Turner, 1923)

Synonyms
- Aeoloscelis ancistrota Turner, 1923

Species of moth

Isorrhoa ancistrota is a moth in the family Cosmopterigidae. It was described by Turner in 1923. It is found in Australia, where it has been recorded from Queensland.
