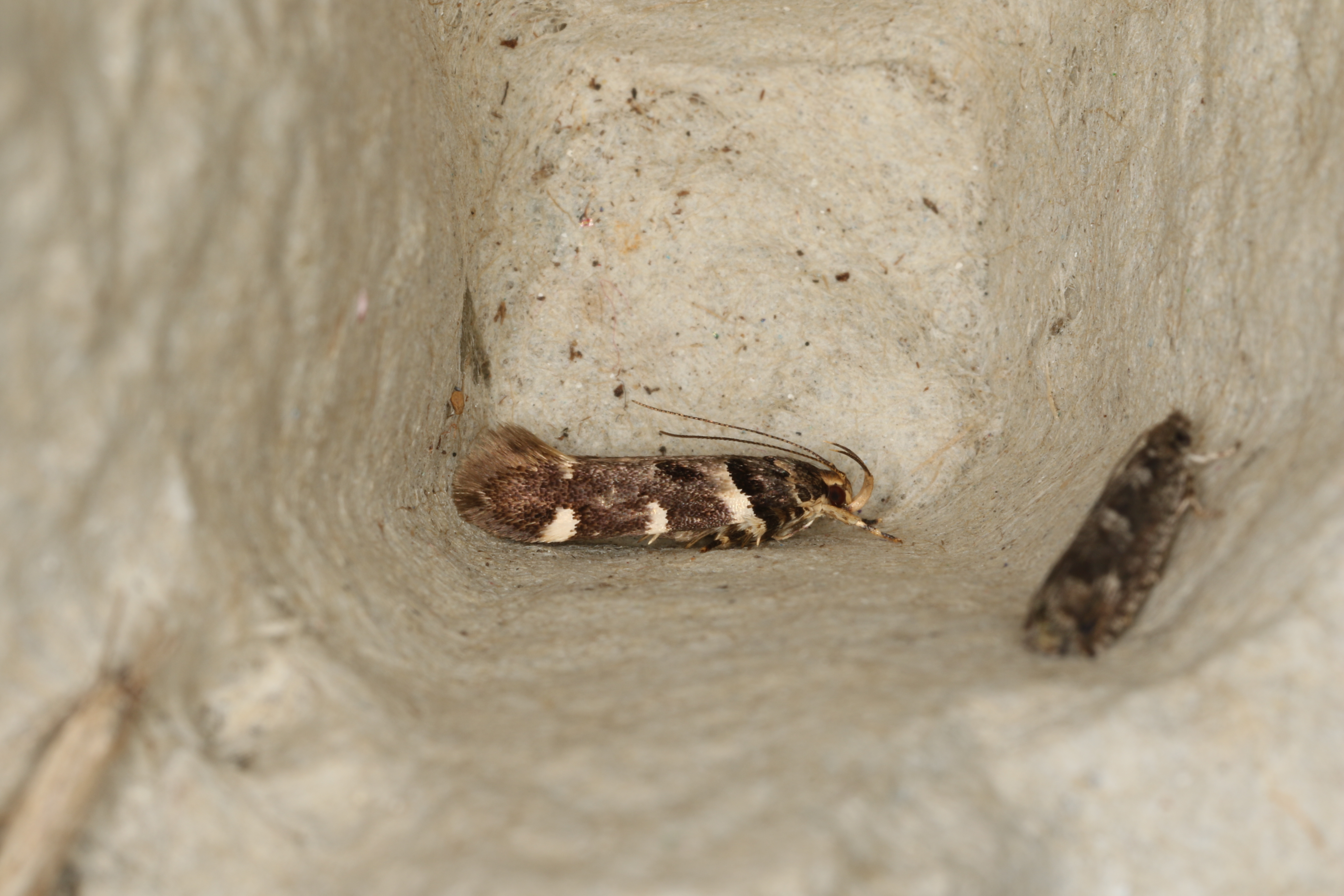
- Aranda, Australian Capital Territory

Scientific classification
- Kingdom: Animalia
- Phylum: Arthropoda
- Clade: Pancrustacea
- Class: Insecta
- Order: Lepidoptera
- Family: Cosmopterigidae
- Genus: Macrobathra
- Species: M. ceraunobola

Binomial name
- Macrobathra ceraunobola Meyrick, 1886

= Macrobathra ceraunobola =

Species of moth

Macrobathra ceraunobola is a moth in the family Cosmopterigidae. It was described by Edward Meyrick in 1886. It is found in Australia, where it has been recorded from Tasmania.
