= Macrobathra callipetala =

Scientific classification
- Kingdom: Animalia
- Phylum: Arthropoda
- Clade: Pancrustacea
- Class: Insecta
- Order: Lepidoptera
- Family: Cosmopterigidae
- Genus: Macrobathra
- Species: M. callipetala

Binomial name
- Macrobathra callipetala Turner, 1932

Species of moth

Macrobathra callipetala is a moth in the family Cosmopterigidae. It was described by Turner in 1932. It is found in northern Australia.
