= Phaneroctena pentasticta =

Scientific classification
- Kingdom: Animalia
- Phylum: Arthropoda
- Class: Insecta
- Order: Lepidoptera
- Family: Cosmopterigidae
- Genus: Phaneroctena
- Species: P. pentasticta

Binomial name
- Phaneroctena pentasticta Turner, 1923

Species of moth

Phaneroctena pentasticta is a moth in the family Cosmopterigidae. It was described by Alfred Jefferis Turner in 1923. It is found in Australia, where it has been recorded from Queensland.
