= Otonoma sphenosema =

Scientific classification
- Kingdom: Animalia
- Phylum: Arthropoda
- Class: Insecta
- Order: Lepidoptera
- Family: Cosmopterigidae
- Genus: Otonoma
- Species: O. sphenosema

Binomial name
- Otonoma sphenosema (Meyrick, 1897)

Synonyms
- Pyroderces sphenosema Meyrick, 1897

Species of moth

Otonoma sphenosema is a moth in the family Cosmopterigidae. It is found in Australia, where it has been recorded from Queensland.
