= Macrobathra phernaea =

Scientific classification
- Kingdom: Animalia
- Phylum: Arthropoda
- Clade: Pancrustacea
- Class: Insecta
- Order: Lepidoptera
- Family: Cosmopterigidae
- Genus: Macrobathra
- Species: M. phernaea

Binomial name
- Macrobathra phernaea Lower, 1899

Species of moth

Macrobathra phernaea is a moth in the family Cosmopterigidae. It was described by Oswald Bertram Lower in 1899. It is found in Australia, where it has been recorded from New South Wales.
