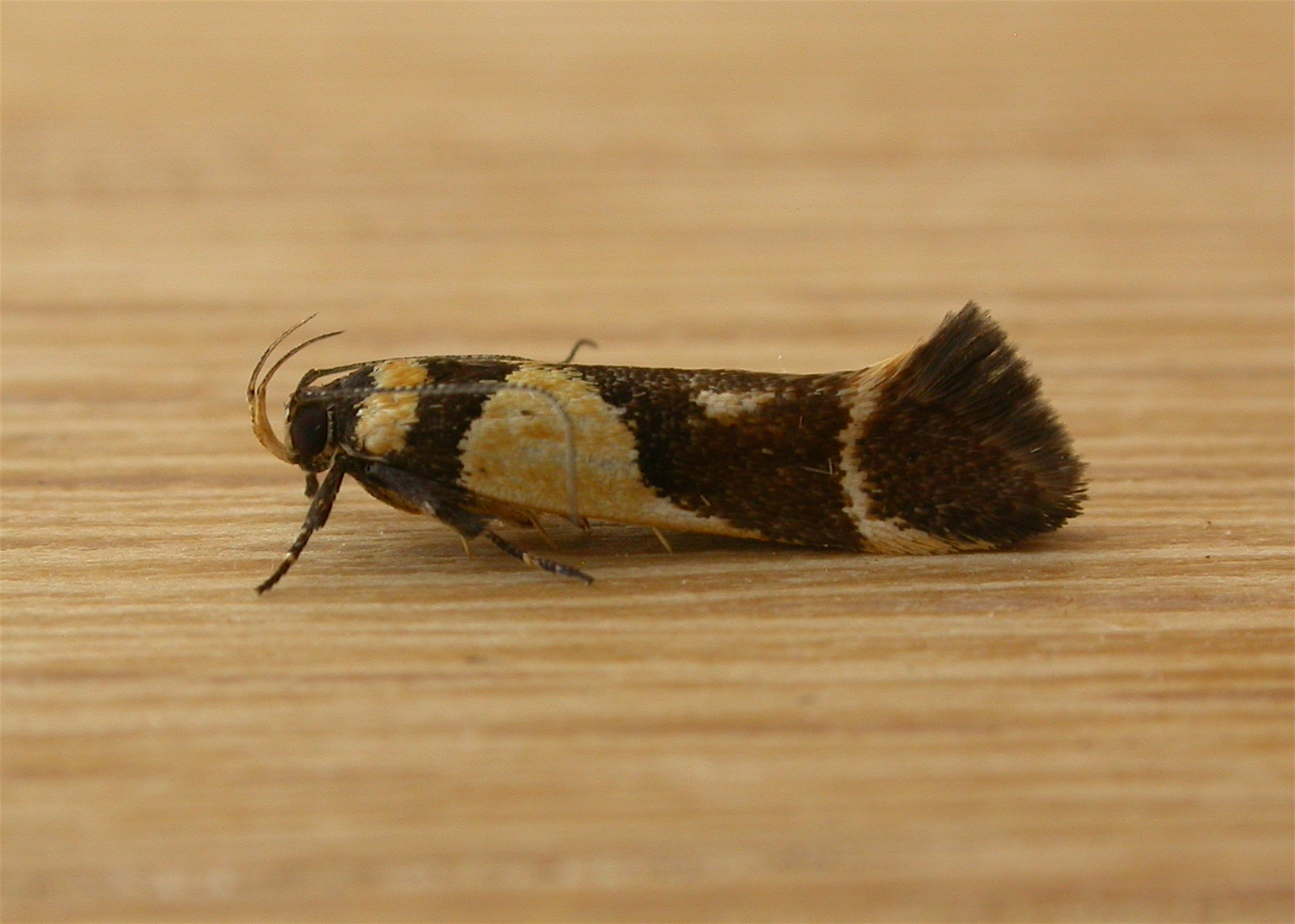

Scientific classification
- Kingdom: Animalia
- Phylum: Arthropoda
- Clade: Pancrustacea
- Class: Insecta
- Order: Lepidoptera
- Family: Cosmopterigidae
- Genus: Macrobathra
- Species: M. chrysotoxa

Binomial name
- Macrobathra chrysotoxa Meyrick, 1886

= Macrobathra chrysotoxa =

Species of moth

Macrobathra chrysotoxa is a species of moth of the family Cosmopterigidae. It is found in Australia.
