= Macrobathra callispila =

Scientific classification
- Kingdom: Animalia
- Phylum: Arthropoda
- Clade: Pancrustacea
- Class: Insecta
- Order: Lepidoptera
- Family: Cosmopterigidae
- Genus: Macrobathra
- Species: M. callispila

Binomial name
- Macrobathra callispila Turner, 1916

Species of moth

Macrobathra callispila is a moth in the family Cosmopterigidae. It was described by Turner in 1916. It is found in northern Australia.
