= Macrobathra niphadobola =

Scientific classification
- Kingdom: Animalia
- Phylum: Arthropoda
- Clade: Pancrustacea
- Class: Insecta
- Order: Lepidoptera
- Family: Cosmopterigidae
- Genus: Macrobathra
- Species: M. niphadobola

Binomial name
- Macrobathra niphadobola Meyrick, 1886

Species of moth

Macrobathra niphadobola is a moth in the family Cosmopterigidae. It was described by Edward Meyrick in 1886. It is found in India and Sri Lanka.
