= Rhadinastis microlychna =

Scientific classification
- Kingdom: Animalia
- Phylum: Arthropoda
- Class: Insecta
- Order: Lepidoptera
- Family: Cosmopterigidae
- Genus: Rhadinastis
- Species: R. microlychna

Binomial name
- Rhadinastis microlychna Meyrick, 1897

Species of moth

Rhadinastis microlychna is a moth in the family Cosmopterigidae. It was described by Edward Meyrick in 1897. It is found in Australia, where it has been recorded from New South Wales.
