= Trissodoris euphaedra =

Scientific classification
- Domain: Eukaryota
- Kingdom: Animalia
- Phylum: Arthropoda
- Class: Insecta
- Order: Lepidoptera
- Family: Cosmopterigidae
- Genus: Trissodoris
- Species: T. euphaedra

Binomial name
- Trissodoris euphaedra (Lower, 1904)

Synonyms
- Aeoloscelis euphaedra Lower, 1904; Persicoptila euphaedra; Persicoptila larozona Turner, 1917

Species of moth

Trissodoris euphaedra is a moth in the family Cosmopterigidae. It is found in Australia.
