= Macrobathra erythrocephala =

Scientific classification
- Kingdom: Animalia
- Phylum: Arthropoda
- Clade: Pancrustacea
- Class: Insecta
- Order: Lepidoptera
- Family: Cosmopterigidae
- Genus: Macrobathra
- Species: M. erythrocephala

Binomial name
- Macrobathra erythrocephala (Lower, 1904)

Synonyms
- Borkhausenia erythrocephala Lower, 1904

Species of moth

Macrobathra erythrocephala is a moth in the family Cosmopterigidae. It was described by Oswald Bertram Lower in 1904. It is found in Australia, where it has been recorded from New South Wales.
