= Macrobathra allophyla =

Scientific classification
- Kingdom: Animalia
- Phylum: Arthropoda
- Clade: Pancrustacea
- Class: Insecta
- Order: Lepidoptera
- Family: Cosmopterigidae
- Genus: Macrobathra
- Species: M. allophyla

Binomial name
- Macrobathra allophyla (Turner, 1944)

Synonyms
- Aspasiodes allophyla Turner, 1944

Species of moth

Macrobathra allophyla is a moth in the family Cosmopterigidae. It was described by Turner in 1944. It is found in Australia.
