= Isorrhoa implicata =

Scientific classification
- Kingdom: Animalia
- Phylum: Arthropoda
- Class: Insecta
- Order: Lepidoptera
- Family: Cosmopterigidae
- Genus: Isorrhoa
- Species: I. implicata

Binomial name
- Isorrhoa implicata Meyrick, 1920

Species of moth

Isorrhoa implicata is a moth in the family Cosmopterigidae. It was described by Edward Meyrick in 1920. It is found in Australia, where it has been recorded from Queensland.
