= Macrobathra mesopora =

Scientific classification
- Kingdom: Animalia
- Phylum: Arthropoda
- Clade: Pancrustacea
- Class: Insecta
- Order: Lepidoptera
- Family: Cosmopterigidae
- Genus: Macrobathra
- Species: M. mesopora

Binomial name
- Macrobathra mesopora Meyrick, 1886

Species of moth

Macrobathra mesopora is a moth in the family Cosmopterigidae. It was described by Edward Meyrick in 1886. The adult moths have off-white forewings with bold dark brown bands and patches. The hindwings are dark brown. The wingspan is about 1.5 cm. It is found in Australia, where it has been recorded from New South Wales.
