= Glaphyristis lithinopa =

Scientific classification
- Kingdom: Animalia
- Phylum: Arthropoda
- Class: Insecta
- Order: Lepidoptera
- Family: Cosmopterigidae
- Genus: Glaphyristis
- Species: G. lithinopa

Binomial name
- Glaphyristis lithinopa Meyrick, 1917

Species of moth

Glaphyristis lithinopa is a moth in the family Cosmopterigidae. It is found in New Guinea and Australia.
