= Macrobathra chryseostola =

Scientific classification
- Kingdom: Animalia
- Phylum: Arthropoda
- Clade: Pancrustacea
- Class: Insecta
- Order: Lepidoptera
- Family: Cosmopterigidae
- Genus: Macrobathra
- Species: M. chryseostola

Binomial name
- Macrobathra chryseostola Turner, 1932

Synonyms
- Macrobathra chrysobaphes Turner, 1896

Species of moth

Macrobathra chryseostola is a moth in the family Cosmopterigidae. It was described by Turner in 1932. It is found in Australia, where it has been recorded from Queensland.
