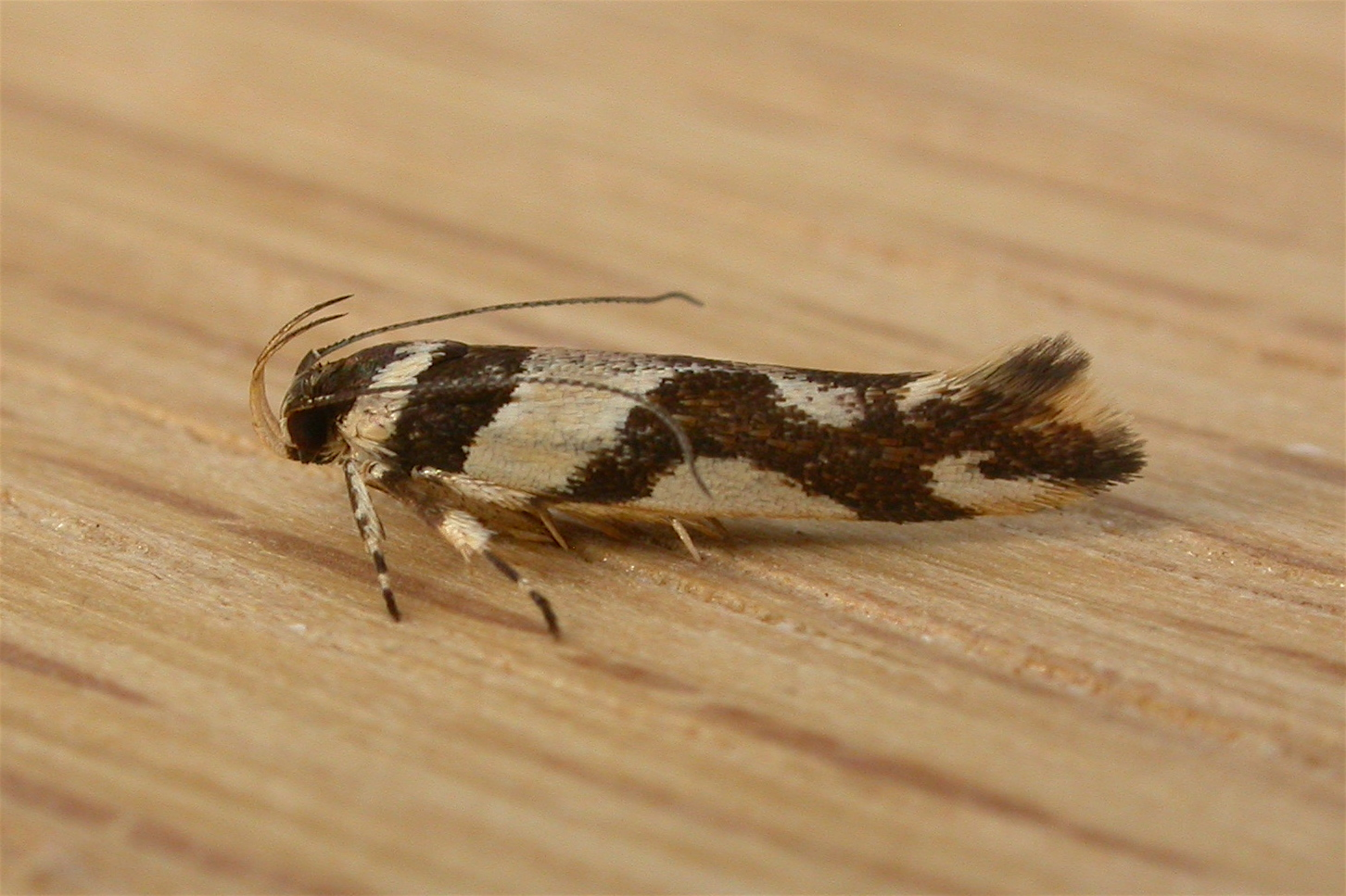

Scientific classification
- Kingdom: Animalia
- Phylum: Arthropoda
- Clade: Pancrustacea
- Class: Insecta
- Order: Lepidoptera
- Family: Cosmopterigidae
- Genus: Macrobathra
- Species: M. desmotoma

Binomial name
- Macrobathra desmotoma Meyrick, 1886

= Macrobathra desmotoma =

Species of moth

Macrobathra desmotoma is a species of moth of the family Cosmopterigidae. It is found in Australia.

The caterpillars are pale yellowish-green with brown stripes along their sides and a light brown head marked by four dark stripes.
