= Macrobathra gastroleuca =

Scientific classification
- Kingdom: Animalia
- Phylum: Arthropoda
- Clade: Pancrustacea
- Class: Insecta
- Order: Lepidoptera
- Family: Cosmopterigidae
- Genus: Macrobathra
- Species: M. gastroleuca

Binomial name
- Macrobathra gastroleuca Lower, 1905

Species of moth

Macrobathra gastroleuca is a moth in the family Cosmopterigidae. It was described by Oswald Bertram Lower in 1905. It is found in Australia, where it has been recorded from New South Wales.
