= Macrobathra eudesma =

Scientific classification
- Kingdom: Animalia
- Phylum: Arthropoda
- Clade: Pancrustacea
- Class: Insecta
- Order: Lepidoptera
- Family: Cosmopterigidae
- Genus: Macrobathra
- Species: M. eudesma

Binomial name
- Macrobathra eudesma Lower, 1900

Species of moth

Macrobathra eudesma is a moth in the family Cosmopterigidae. It was described by Oswald Bertram Lower in 1900. It is found in Australia.
