= Limnaecia lunacrescens =

Scientific classification
- Kingdom: Animalia
- Phylum: Arthropoda
- Clade: Pancrustacea
- Class: Insecta
- Order: Lepidoptera
- Family: Cosmopterigidae
- Genus: Limnaecia
- Species: L. lunacrescens

Binomial name
- Limnaecia lunacrescens (T. P. Lucas, 1901)

Synonyms
- Macrobathra lunacrescens T. P. Lucas, 1901

Species of moth

Limnaecia lunacrescens is a moth of the family Cosmopterigidae. It was described by Thomas Pennington Lucas in 1901 and is from Australia.
