= Heureta cirrhodora =

Scientific classification
- Kingdom: Animalia
- Phylum: Arthropoda
- Class: Insecta
- Order: Lepidoptera
- Family: Cosmopterigidae
- Genus: Heureta
- Species: H. cirrhodora

Binomial name
- Heureta cirrhodora (Meyrick, 1915)

Synonyms
- Macrobathra cirrhodora Meyrick, 1915

Species of moth

Heureta cirrhodora is a moth in the family Cosmopterigidae. It was described by Edward Meyrick in 1915. It is found in Australia, where it has been recorded from Victoria.
