= Mimodoxa metallica =

Scientific classification
- Domain: Eukaryota
- Kingdom: Animalia
- Phylum: Arthropoda
- Class: Insecta
- Order: Lepidoptera
- Family: Cosmopterigidae
- Genus: Mimodoxa
- Species: M. metallica

Binomial name
- Mimodoxa metallica (Lower, 1899)

Synonyms
- Macrobathra metallica Lower, 1899

Species of moth

Mimodoxa metallica is a moth in the family Cosmopterigidae. It is found in Australia, where it has been recorded from New South Wales.
