= Limnaecia monoxantha =

Scientific classification
- Kingdom: Animalia
- Phylum: Arthropoda
- Clade: Pancrustacea
- Class: Insecta
- Order: Lepidoptera
- Family: Cosmopterigidae
- Genus: Limnaecia
- Species: L. monoxantha

Binomial name
- Limnaecia monoxantha (Meyrick, 1922)

Synonyms
- Macrobathra monoxantha Meyrick, 1922

Species of moth

Limnaecia monoxantha is a moth of the family Cosmopterigidae. It is known from Australia.
