= Limnaecia definitiva =

Scientific classification
- Kingdom: Animalia
- Phylum: Arthropoda
- Clade: Pancrustacea
- Class: Insecta
- Order: Lepidoptera
- Family: Cosmopterigidae
- Genus: Limnaecia
- Species: L. definitiva

Binomial name
- Limnaecia definitiva (T.P. Lucas, 1901)

Synonyms
- Macrobathra definitiva T.P. Lucas, 1901

Species of moth

Limnaecia definitiva is a moth of the family Cosmopterigidae. It is known from Australia.
