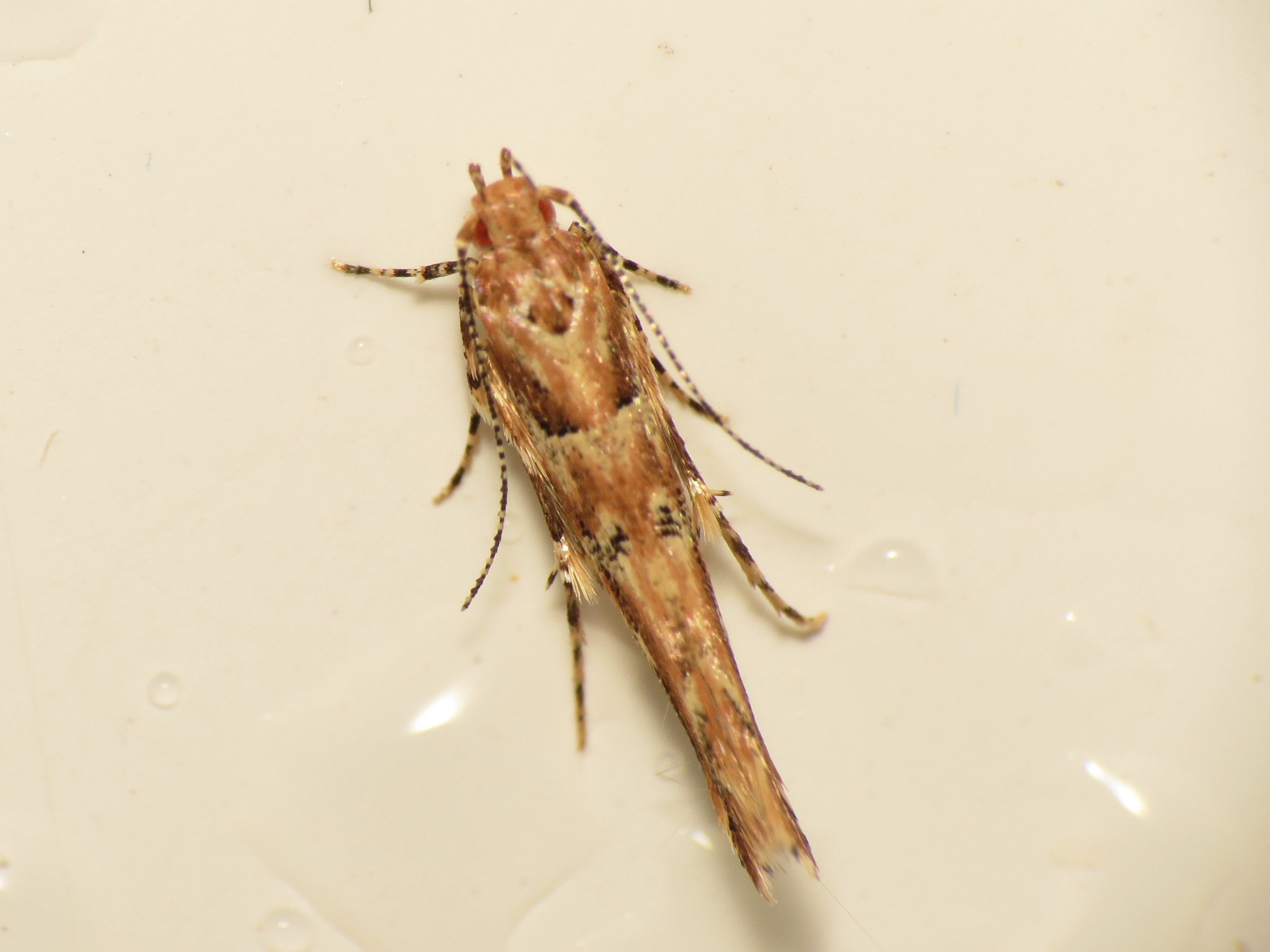
- Anatrachyntis badia

Scientific classification
- Kingdom: Animalia
- Phylum: Arthropoda
- Clade: Pancrustacea
- Class: Insecta
- Order: Lepidoptera
- Family: Cosmopterigidae
- Subfamily: Cosmopteriginae
- Genus: Anatrachyntis; Meyrick, 1915

Type species
- Gracilaria falcatella Stainton, 1859

Synonyms
- Amneris Riedl, 1993; Euamneris Riedl, 1996; Sathrobrota Hodges, 1962

= Anatrachyntis =

Genus of moths

Anatrachyntis is a genus of moths in the family Cosmopterigidae. Some authors include it in Pyroderces.

== Species ==
- Anatrachyntis acris (Meyrick, 1911) (the Seychelles)
- Anatrachyntis aellotricha (Meyrick, 1889) (New Zealand) (often in Pyroderces)
- Anatrachyntis amphisaris (Meyrick, 1922) (Sri Lanka)
- Anatrachyntis anaclastis (Meyrick, 1897) (Australia, Queensland)
- Anatrachyntis anoista (Bradley, 1956) (Lord Howe Island)
- Anatrachyntis badia – Florida pink scavenger
- Anatrachyntis bicincta (Ghesquière, 1940) (Zaire)
- Anatrachyntis biorrhizae Sinev, 1986 (Russia, Primorje)
- Anatrachyntis calefacta (Meyrick, 1922) (India)
- Anatrachyntis carpophila (Ghesquière, 1940) (Zaire)
- Anatrachyntis cecidicida (Ghesquière, 1940) (Zaire)
- Anatrachyntis centropecta (Meyrick, 1931) (Peninsular Malaysia)
- Anatrachyntis centrophanes (Meyrick, 1915) (India)
- Anatrachyntis coriacella (Snellen, 1901) (Indonesia, Java)
- Anatrachyntis coridophaga (Meyrick, 1925) (North Africa, Egypt)
- Anatrachyntis cyma (Bradley, 1953) (Fiji)
- Anatrachyntis dactyliota (Meyrick, 1931) (Peninsular Malaysia)
- Anatrachyntis euryspora (Meyrick, 1922) (Fiji)
- Anatrachyntis exagria (Meyrick, 1915) (India)
- Anatrachyntis falcatella (Stainton, 1859) (India)
- Anatrachyntis floretella (Legrand, 1958) (Seychelles)
- Anatrachyntis gerberanella (Legrand, 1965) (Seychelles)
- Anatrachyntis gymnocentra (Meyrick, 1937) (Zaire)
- Anatrachyntis haemodryas (Meyrick, 1930) (Peninsular Malaysia)
- Anatrachyntis hemipelta Meyrick, 1917 (India)
- Anatrachyntis hieroglypta (Meyrick, 1911) (Seychelles)
- Anatrachyntis holotherma (Meyrick, 1936) (Zaire)
- Anatrachyntis incertulella – pandanus flower moth
- Anatrachyntis japonica Kuroko, 1982 (Japan)
- Anatrachyntis lunulifera (Meyrick, 1934) (Marquesas)
- Anatrachyntis megacentra (Meyrick, 1923) (Fiji)
- Anatrachyntis melanostigma (Diakonoff, 1954) (New Guinea)
- Anatrachyntis mesoptila (Meyrick, 1897) (Australia, Queensland)
- Anatrachyntis mythologica Meyrick, 1917 (Sri Lanka)
- Anatrachyntis nephelopyrrha Meyrick, 1917 (India)
- Anatrachyntis orphnographa (Meyrick, 1936) (Zaire)
- Anatrachyntis oxyptila (Meyrick, 1928) (New Ireland)
- Anatrachyntis palmicola (Ghesquière, 1940) (Zaire)
- Anatrachyntis paroditis (Meyrick, 1928) (Fiji)
- Anatrachyntis philocarpa (Meyrick, 1922) (Iraq)
- Anatrachyntis philogeorga (Meyrick, 1933) (Tanzania)
- Anatrachyntis ptilodelta (Meyrick, 1922) (China, Shanghai)
- Anatrachyntis pyrrhodes (Meyrick, 1897) (Australia)
- Anatrachyntis rhizonympha (Meyrick, 1924) (India)
- Anatrachyntis rileyi – pink cornworm, pink bud moth, pink scavenger
- Anatrachyntis risbeci (Ghesquière, 1940) (Senegal)
- Anatrachyntis sesamivora (Meyrick, 1933) (Indonesia, Java)
- Anatrachyntis simplex (Walsingham, 1891) (Africa, Gambia)
- Anatrachyntis strangalota (Meyrick, 1922) (southern India)
- Anatrachyntis tentoria (Meyrick, 1911) (Seychelles)
- Anatrachyntis terminella (Walker, 1864) (Australia, New South Wales)
- Anatrachyntis tripola (Meyrick, 1909) (South Africa, Transvaal)
- Anatrachyntis vanharteni Koster, 2010
- Anatrachyntis yunnanea (Zagulajev, 1959) (China, Yunnan)
