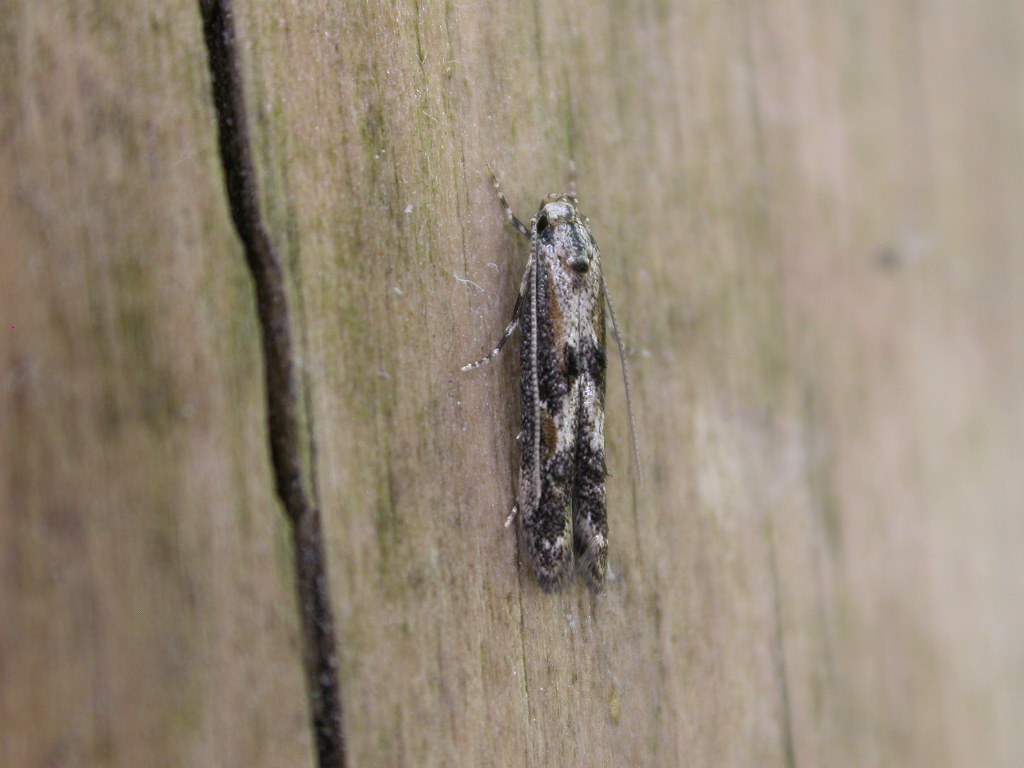
- Blastodacna atra

Scientific classification
- Kingdom: Animalia
- Phylum: Arthropoda
- Clade: Pancrustacea
- Class: Insecta
- Order: Lepidoptera
- Family: Elachistidae
- Subfamily: Agonoxeninae
- Genus: Blastodacna; Wocke, 1876

Synonyms
- Sinitinea Yang, 1977

= Blastodacna =

Genus of moths

Blastodacna is a genus of moths of the family Elachistidae.

== Distribution ==
Blastodacna species are found in the Holarctic, although most species are native to the Palearctic.

== Taxonomy ==
The genus is mostly placed in the family Elachistidae, but other authors list it as a member of the family Agonoxenidae or even assign it its own family, the Blastodacnidae.

== Species ==
- Blastodacna atra (Haworth, 1828)
- Blastodacna bicristatella (Chambers, 1875)
- Blastodacna curvilineella (Chambers, 1872)
- Blastodacna erebopis Meyrick, 1934
- Blastodacna georgiella Sinev, 1988
- Blastodacna hellerella (Duponchel, 1838)
- Blastodacna libanotica Diakonoff, 1939
- Blastodacna lvovskyi Sinev, 1986
- Blastodacna mandshurica Sinev, 1988
- Blastodacna mironovi Sinev, 1989
- Blastodacna ochrella Sugisima, 2004
- Blastodacna pyrigalla (Yang, 1977)
- Blastodacna rossica Sinev, 1989
- Blastodacna vinolentella (Herrich-Schäffer, 1854)

== Former species ==
- Blastodacna cinnamomina Turati, 1930
