= Blastodacna rossica =

Scientific classification
- Kingdom: Animalia
- Phylum: Arthropoda
- Clade: Pancrustacea
- Class: Insecta
- Order: Lepidoptera
- Family: Elachistidae
- Genus: Blastodacna
- Species: B. rossica

Binomial name
- Blastodacna rossica Sinev, 1989

Species of moth

Blastodacna rossica is a moth in the family Elachistidae. It is found on the Crimea and in the western part of Transcaucasia and central Asia.

The wingspan is 9–13 mm. Adults are on wing from the end of May to August in Europe and from April to May in central Asia. There is one generation per year.

The larvae feed on Malus species and possibly also on Pyrus communis.
