= Anatrachyntis cecidicida =

Scientific classification
- Domain: Eukaryota
- Kingdom: Animalia
- Phylum: Arthropoda
- Class: Insecta
- Order: Lepidoptera
- Family: Cosmopterigidae
- Genus: Anatrachyntis
- Species: A. cecidicida

Binomial name
- Anatrachyntis cecidicida (Ghesquière, 1940)

Synonyms
- Pyroderces cecidicida Ghesquière, 1940

Species of moth

Anatrachyntis cecidicida is a moth in the family Cosmopterigidae. It was described by Jean Ghesquière in 1940 and is known from the Democratic Republic of the Congo.
