= Anatrachyntis yunnanea =

Scientific classification
- Domain: Eukaryota
- Kingdom: Animalia
- Phylum: Arthropoda
- Class: Insecta
- Order: Lepidoptera
- Family: Cosmopterigidae
- Genus: Anatrachyntis
- Species: A. yunnanea

Binomial name
- Anatrachyntis yunnanea Zagulajev, 1959

Synonyms
- Pyroderces yunnanea

Species of moth

Anatrachyntis yunnanea is a moth in the family Cosmopterigidae. It was described by Zagulajav in 1959, and is known from Yunnan, China, from which its species epithet is derived.
