= Blastodacna georgiella =

Scientific classification
- Kingdom: Animalia
- Phylum: Arthropoda
- Clade: Pancrustacea
- Class: Insecta
- Order: Lepidoptera
- Family: Elachistidae
- Genus: Blastodacna
- Species: B. georgiella

Binomial name
- Blastodacna georgiella Sinev, 1988

Species of moth

Blastodacna georgiella is a moth in the family Elachistidae. It is found in western Transcaucasia and Georgia.

The wingspan is 11–12 mm. Adults have been recorded from the beginning of June to mid July.
