= Blastodacna ochrella =

Scientific classification
- Domain: Eukaryota
- Kingdom: Animalia
- Phylum: Arthropoda
- Class: Insecta
- Order: Lepidoptera
- Family: Elachistidae
- Genus: Blastodacna
- Species: B. ochrella

Binomial name
- Blastodacna ochrella Sugisima, 2004

Species of moth

Blastodacna ochrella is a moth in the family Elachistidae. It is found in Japan (Hokkaido, Honshu).

The length of the forewings is 5-5.8 mm. Adults are on wing from late May to early July.
