= Pyroderces tersectella =

Scientific classification
- Kingdom: Animalia
- Phylum: Arthropoda
- Clade: Pancrustacea
- Class: Insecta
- Order: Lepidoptera
- Family: Cosmopterigidae
- Genus: Pyroderces
- Species: P. tersectella

Binomial name
- Pyroderces tersectella (Zeller, 1877)

Synonyms
- Elachista tersectella Zeller, 1877

Species of moth

Pyroderces tersectella is a moth in the family Cosmopterigidae. It is found in Colombia.
