= Pyroderces chalcoptila =

Scientific classification
- Kingdom: Animalia
- Phylum: Arthropoda
- Class: Insecta
- Order: Lepidoptera
- Family: Cosmopterigidae
- Genus: Pyroderces
- Species: P. chalcoptila

Binomial name
- Pyroderces chalcoptila (Meyrick, 1922)

Synonyms
- Syntomactis chalcoptila Meyrick, 1922

Species of moth

Pyroderces chalcoptila is a moth in the family Cosmopterigidae. It was described by Edward Meyrick in 1922. It is found in Peru.
