= Blastodacna bicristatella =

Scientific classification
- Kingdom: Animalia
- Phylum: Arthropoda
- Clade: Pancrustacea
- Class: Insecta
- Order: Lepidoptera
- Family: Elachistidae
- Genus: Blastodacna
- Species: B. bicristatella

Binomial name
- Blastodacna bicristatella (Chambers, 1875)

Synonyms
- Gelechia bicristatella Chambers, 1875; Batrachedra placendiella Busck, 1908; Colonophora sublustris Meyrick, 1922

Species of moth

Blastodacna bicristatella is a moth in the family Elachistidae. It was described by Vactor Tousey Chambers in 1875. It is found in North America, where it has been recorded from Illinois, Indiana, Kentucky, Ohio and Quebec.

The wingspan is 12 mm. The forewings are pale ochreous, dusted and suffused with brown. There is an oblong tuft of dark brown raised scales on the fold and a short brown streak between it and the dorsal margin. There is another tuft of brown scales at the end of the cell and the apical part of the wing is dark brown. Adults have been recorded on wing in May and June.
