= Pyroderces dimidiella =

Scientific classification
- Kingdom: Animalia
- Phylum: Arthropoda
- Class: Insecta
- Order: Lepidoptera
- Family: Cosmopterigidae
- Genus: Pyroderces
- Species: P. dimidiella

Binomial name
- Pyroderces dimidiella (Snellen, 1885)

Synonyms
- Labdia dimidiella Snellen, 1885

Species of moth

Pyroderces dimidiella is a moth in the family Cosmopterigidae. It is found on Sulawesi.
