= Pyroderces deamatella =

Scientific classification
- Kingdom: Animalia
- Phylum: Arthropoda
- Clade: Pancrustacea
- Class: Insecta
- Order: Lepidoptera
- Family: Cosmopterigidae
- Genus: Pyroderces
- Species: P. deamatella

Binomial name
- Pyroderces deamatella (Walker, 1864)

Synonyms
- Gelechia deamatella Walker, 1864; Syntomactis deamatella (Walker, 1864)

Species of moth endemic to New Zealand

Pyroderces deamatella is a species of moth in the family Cosmopterigidae. It was first described by Francis Walker in 1864. It is endemic to New Zealand and is found in the North and South Islands. This species inhabits native forest. The larvae feed on a wide variety of leaf litter and twigs and have an affiliation with the plant species Olearia odorata. Adults are on the wing from November until March.

== Taxonomy ==
This species was first described by Francis Walker in 1864 and originally named Gelechia deamatella. In 1889 Edward Meyrick placed this species in the genus Syntomactis. In 1924 Meyrick placed this species in the genus Pyroderces. George Hudson discussed and illustrated this species under the name Syntomactis deamatella in his 1928 book The butterflies and moths of New Zealand. The male holotype specimen, collected in Nelson by Thomas R. Oxley, is held at the Natural History Museum, London.

== Description ==
Breeding pair.

P. deamatella at rest.

Meyrick described this species as follows:

♀♂. 11-12 mm. Head ochreous-white. Palpi white, second joint with basal half black, and apical and subapical ochreous rings, terminal joint with basal half black. Antennae whitish, obscurely ringed with blackish. Thorax white, or whitish-ochreous. Abdomen pale yellowish-ochreous, posteriorly greyer. Legs blackish, ringed with ochreous-white. Fore-wings very elongate, narrow, long-pointed ; greyish-ochreous, coarsely and irregularly irrorated with dark fuscous ; markings white, tending to be margined by a black suffusion ; a triangular spot on costa before 1/4, its apex sometimes almost reaching inner margin ; an irregular somewhat oblique blotch beyond middle, touching costa anteriorly, and almost reaching inner margin ; a small ill-defined, irregular, transverse spot near apex, most distinct on costa : cilia pale ochreous-greyish, round apex somewhat mixed with fuscous. Hindwings grey ; cilia pale ochreous-grey.

== Distribution ==
This species is endemic to New Zealand. This species is found in the North and South Islands.

== Habitat and hosts ==
This species inhabits native forest. The larvae feed on a wide variety of leaf litter and twigs and have been shown to have an affiliation with Olearia odorata.

== Behaviour ==
Adults are on the wing from November until March.
