= Pyroderces longalitella =

Scientific classification
- Domain: Eukaryota
- Kingdom: Animalia
- Phylum: Arthropoda
- Class: Insecta
- Order: Lepidoptera
- Family: Cosmopterigidae
- Genus: Pyroderces
- Species: P. longalitella

Binomial name
- Pyroderces longalitella Legrand, 1966

Species of moth

Pyroderces longalitella is a moth in the family Cosmopterigidae. It is found on the Seychelles.
