= Pyroderces argobalana =

Scientific classification
- Kingdom: Animalia
- Phylum: Arthropoda
- Class: Insecta
- Order: Lepidoptera
- Family: Cosmopterigidae
- Genus: Pyroderces
- Species: P. argobalana

Binomial name
- Pyroderces argobalana Meyrick, 1915

Species of moth

Pyroderces argobalana is a moth in the family Cosmopterigidae. It is found in Australia, where it has been recorded from Queensland.
