= Pyroderces bifurcata =

Scientific classification
- Kingdom: Animalia
- Phylum: Arthropoda
- Clade: Pancrustacea
- Class: Insecta
- Order: Lepidoptera
- Family: Cosmopterigidae
- Genus: Pyroderces
- Species: P. bifurcata

Binomial name
- Pyroderces bifurcata Zhang & Li, 2009

Species of moth

Pyroderces bifurcata is a moth in the family Cosmopterigidae. It is endemic to China (Anhui, Guizhou, Hunan, Jiangxi, Tianjin).

The wingspan is 11.5–13.5 mm.
