= Anatrachyntis gerberanella =

Scientific classification
- Domain: Eukaryota
- Kingdom: Animalia
- Phylum: Arthropoda
- Class: Insecta
- Order: Lepidoptera
- Family: Cosmopterigidae
- Genus: Anatrachyntis
- Species: A. gerberanella

Binomial name
- Anatrachyntis gerberanella (Legrand, 1965)

Synonyms
- Stagmatophora gerberanella Legrand, 1965

Species of moth

Anatrachyntis gerberanella is a moth in the family Cosmopterigidae. It was described by Henry Legrand in 1965, and is known from the Seychelles.
