= Anatrachyntis japonica =

Scientific classification
- Kingdom: Animalia
- Phylum: Arthropoda
- Class: Insecta
- Order: Lepidoptera
- Family: Cosmopterigidae
- Genus: Anatrachyntis
- Species: A. japonica

Binomial name
- Anatrachyntis japonica Kuroko, 1982

Synonyms
- Pyroderces japonica Inoue, Sugi, Kuroko, Moriuti & Kawabe, 1982

Species of moth

Anatrachyntis japonica is a moth in the family Cosmopterigidae. It was described by Kuroko in 1982, and is known from Japan.
