= Anatrachyntis haemodryas =

Scientific classification
- Kingdom: Animalia
- Phylum: Arthropoda
- Class: Insecta
- Order: Lepidoptera
- Family: Cosmopterigidae
- Genus: Anatrachyntis
- Species: A. haemodryas

Binomial name
- Anatrachyntis haemodryas (Meyrick, 1930)

Synonyms
- Pyroderces haemodryas Meyrick, 1930

Species of moth

Anatrachyntis haemodryas is a moth in the family Cosmopterigidae. Described by Edward Meyrick in 1930, it can also be found at Peninsular Malaysia.
