= Anatrachyntis rhizonympha =

Scientific classification
- Kingdom: Animalia
- Phylum: Arthropoda
- Class: Insecta
- Order: Lepidoptera
- Family: Cosmopterigidae
- Genus: Anatrachyntis
- Species: A. rhizonympha

Binomial name
- Anatrachyntis rhizonympha (Meyrick, 1924)

Synonyms
- Pyroderces rhizonympha Meyrick, 1924

Species of moth

Anatrachyntis rhizonympha is a moth in the family Cosmopterigidae. It was described by Edward Meyrick in 1924, and is known from India.
