= Pyroderces eupogon =

Scientific classification
- Domain: Eukaryota
- Kingdom: Animalia
- Phylum: Arthropoda
- Class: Insecta
- Order: Lepidoptera
- Family: Cosmopterigidae
- Genus: Pyroderces
- Species: P. eupogon

Binomial name
- Pyroderces eupogon Turner, 1926

Species of moth

Pyroderces eupogon is a moth in the family Cosmopterigidae. It is found in Australia, where it has been recorded from New South Wales.
