= Anatrachyntis hemipelta =

Scientific classification
- Kingdom: Animalia
- Phylum: Arthropoda
- Class: Insecta
- Order: Lepidoptera
- Family: Cosmopterigidae
- Genus: Anatrachyntis
- Species: A. hemipelta

Binomial name
- Anatrachyntis hemipelta Meyrick, 1917

Synonyms
- Pyroderces hemipelta

Species of moth

Anatrachyntis hemipelta is a moth in the family Cosmopterigidae. It was described by Edward Meyrick in 1917, and is known from India.
