= Anatrachyntis anoista =

Scientific classification
- Domain: Eukaryota
- Kingdom: Animalia
- Phylum: Arthropoda
- Class: Insecta
- Order: Lepidoptera
- Family: Cosmopterigidae
- Genus: Anatrachyntis
- Species: A. anoista

Binomial name
- Anatrachyntis anoista Bradley, 1956

Synonyms
- Pyroderces anoista

Species of moth

Anatrachyntis anoista is a moth in the family Cosmopterigidae. It was described by John David Bradley in 1956 and is known from Lord Howe Island.
