= Anatrachyntis dactyliota =

Scientific classification
- Kingdom: Animalia
- Phylum: Arthropoda
- Class: Insecta
- Order: Lepidoptera
- Family: Cosmopterigidae
- Genus: Anatrachyntis
- Species: A. dactyliota

Binomial name
- Anatrachyntis dactyliota (Meyrick, 1931)

Synonyms
- Pyroderces dactyliota Meyrick, 1931

Species of moth

Anatrachyntis dactyliota is a moth in the family Cosmopterigidae. It was described by Edward Meyrick in 1931, and is known from Peninsular Malaysia.
