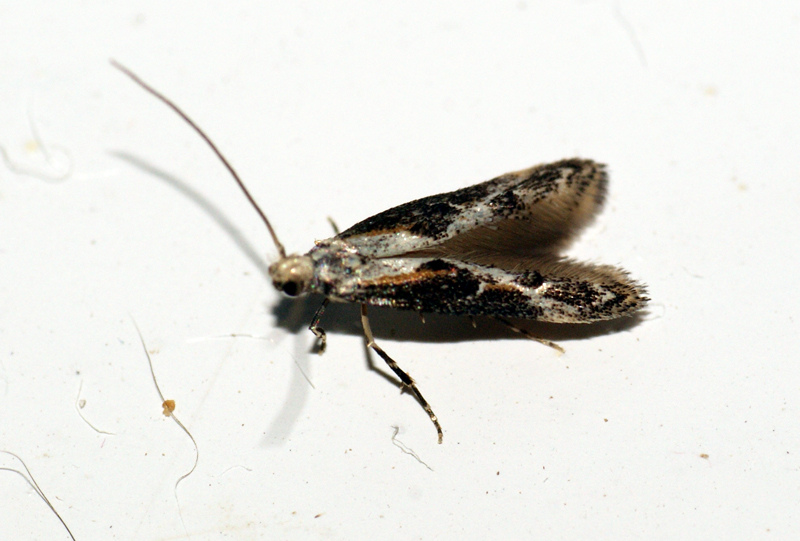

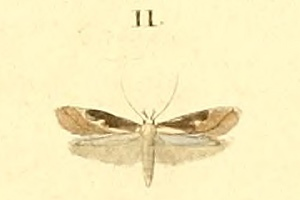

Scientific classification
- Domain: Eukaryota
- Kingdom: Animalia
- Phylum: Arthropoda
- Class: Insecta
- Order: Lepidoptera
- Family: Elachistidae
- Genus: Blastodacna
- Species: B. hellerella

Binomial name
- Blastodacna hellerella (Duponchel, 1838)

Synonyms
- Alucita hellerella Duponchel, 1838

= Blastodacna hellerella =

Species of moth

Blastodacna hellerella is a moth in the family Elachistidae. It is found in most of Europe except the north. In the east, the range extends to the Caucasus.

== Description ==
The wingspan is 10–13 mm. Adults are on wing from the May to August in one generation per year.

The larvae feed on midland hawthorn (Crataegus laevigata) and common hawthorn (Crataegus monogyna). There are unconfirmed records for blackthorn (Prunus spinosa), European plum (Prunus domestica) and apple (Malus species), although there may be confusion with other species. Pupation takes place in rotten wood during the autumn.
