= Pyroderces cervinella =

Scientific classification
- Domain: Eukaryota
- Kingdom: Animalia
- Phylum: Arthropoda
- Class: Insecta
- Order: Lepidoptera
- Family: Cosmopterigidae
- Genus: Pyroderces
- Species: P. cervinella

Binomial name
- Pyroderces cervinella (Walsingham, 1897)

Synonyms
- Syntomactis cervinella Walsingham, 1897

Species of moth

Pyroderces cervinella is a moth in the family Cosmopterigidae. It is found on the West Indies.
