= Anatrachyntis philogeorga =

Scientific classification
- Kingdom: Animalia
- Phylum: Arthropoda
- Class: Insecta
- Order: Lepidoptera
- Family: Cosmopterigidae
- Genus: Anatrachyntis
- Species: A. philogeorga

Binomial name
- Anatrachyntis philogeorga (Meyrick, 1933)

Synonyms
- Pyroderces philogeorga Meyrick, 1933

Species of moth

Anatrachyntis philogeorga is a moth in the family Cosmopterigidae. It was described by Edward Meyrick in 1933, and is known from Tanzania.
