= Anatrachyntis falcatella =

Scientific classification
- Kingdom: Animalia
- Phylum: Arthropoda
- Clade: Pancrustacea
- Class: Insecta
- Order: Lepidoptera
- Family: Cosmopterigidae
- Genus: Anatrachyntis
- Species: A. falcatella

Binomial name
- Anatrachyntis falcatella (Stainton, 1859)

Synonyms
- Gracilaria falcatella Stainton, 1859; Pyroderces falcatella; Pyroderces dendrophaga Meyrick, 1920; Pyroderces spodoctha Meyrick, 1905

Species of moth

Anatrachyntis falcatella is a moth in the family Cosmopterigidae. It was described by Henry Tibbats Stainton in 1859, and is known from India, China, Sri Lanka and Australia.

The larvae feed on Hibiscus rosa-sinensis.
