= Anatrachyntis melanostigma =

Scientific classification
- Domain: Eukaryota
- Kingdom: Animalia
- Phylum: Arthropoda
- Class: Insecta
- Order: Lepidoptera
- Family: Cosmopterigidae
- Genus: Anatrachyntis
- Species: A. melanostigma

Binomial name
- Anatrachyntis melanostigma (Diakonoff, 1954)

Synonyms
- Dorodoca melanostigma Diakonoff, 1954

Species of moth

Anatrachyntis melanostigma is a moth in the family Cosmopterigidae. It was described by Alexey Diakonoff in 1954 and is known from New Guinea.
