= Anatrachyntis holotherma =

Scientific classification
- Kingdom: Animalia
- Phylum: Arthropoda
- Class: Insecta
- Order: Lepidoptera
- Family: Cosmopterigidae
- Genus: Anatrachyntis
- Species: A. holotherma

Binomial name
- Anatrachyntis holotherma (Meyrick, 1936)

Synonyms
- Pyroderces holotherma Meyrick, 1936

Species of moth

Anatrachyntis holotherma is a moth in the family Cosmopterigidae. In 1936 it was described by Edward Meyrick and is known from the Democratic Republic of the Congo.
