= Anatrachyntis mesoptila =

Scientific classification
- Kingdom: Animalia
- Phylum: Arthropoda
- Class: Insecta
- Order: Lepidoptera
- Family: Cosmopterigidae
- Genus: Anatrachyntis
- Species: A. mesoptila

Binomial name
- Anatrachyntis mesoptila (Meyrick, 1897)

Synonyms
- Pyroderces mesoptila Meyrick, 1897

Species of moth

Anatrachyntis mesoptila is a moth in the family Cosmopterigidae. It was described by Edward Meyrick in 1897, and is known from Queensland, Australia.
