= Pyroderces syngalactis =

Scientific classification
- Kingdom: Animalia
- Phylum: Arthropoda
- Class: Insecta
- Order: Lepidoptera
- Family: Cosmopterigidae
- Genus: Pyroderces
- Species: P. syngalactis

Binomial name
- Pyroderces syngalactis Meyrick, 1928

Species of moth

Pyroderces syngalactis is a moth in the family Cosmopterigidae. It is found on the New Hebrides.
