= Anatrachyntis terminella =

Scientific classification
- Kingdom: Animalia
- Phylum: Arthropoda
- Class: Insecta
- Order: Lepidoptera
- Family: Cosmopterigidae
- Genus: Anatrachyntis
- Species: A. terminella

Binomial name
- Anatrachyntis terminella (Walker, 1864)

Synonyms
- Gracilaria terminella Walker, 1864; Pyroderces terminella

Species of moth

Anatrachyntis terminella is a moth in the family Cosmopterigidae. It was described by Francis Walker in 1864 and is known from Australia (including New South Wales) and Fiji.

The wingspan is about 8 mm.
