= Anatrachyntis philocarpa =

Scientific classification
- Kingdom: Animalia
- Phylum: Arthropoda
- Class: Insecta
- Order: Lepidoptera
- Family: Cosmopterigidae
- Genus: Anatrachyntis
- Species: A. philocarpa

Binomial name
- Anatrachyntis philocarpa (Meyrick, 1922)

Synonyms
- Pyroderces philocarpa Meyrick, 1922; Labdia philocarpa

Species of moth

Anatrachyntis philocarpa is a moth in the family Cosmopterigidae. It was described by Edward Meyrick in 1922, and is known from Iraq.
