= Anatrachyntis coriacella =

Scientific classification
- Kingdom: Animalia
- Phylum: Arthropoda
- Clade: Pancrustacea
- Class: Insecta
- Order: Lepidoptera
- Family: Cosmopterigidae
- Genus: Anatrachyntis
- Species: A. coriacella

Binomial name
- Anatrachyntis coriacella (Snellen, 1901)

Synonyms
- Batrachedra coriacella Snellen, 1901; Sathrobrota coriacella; Pyroderces coriacella

Species of moth

Anatrachyntis coriacella is a moth in the family Cosmopterigidae. It was described by Snellen in 1901, and is known from Indonesia (Java), India, Malaysia, Mauritius, United States and Australia.

The larvae feed on Malvaceae (Gossypium sp.).
