= Pyroderces caesaris =

Scientific classification
- Kingdom: Animalia
- Phylum: Arthropoda
- Clade: Pancrustacea
- Class: Insecta
- Order: Lepidoptera
- Family: Cosmopterigidae
- Genus: Pyroderces
- Species: P. caesaris

Binomial name
- Pyroderces caesaris Gozmany, 1957

Species of moth

Pyroderces caesaris is a moth in the family Cosmopterigidae. It is found in Spain, Sardinia, Sicily, Italy, Croatia, Greece, Bulgaria, Romania, Moldova and Ukraine.

The wingspan is 13–15 mm. Adults are on wing from the end of May to the beginning of fall in one generation per year.

The larvae feed on Echinops ruthenicus, Centaurea orientalis, Centaurea salonitana and Cirsium sublaniflorum.
