= Blastodacna pyrigalla =

Scientific classification
- Domain: Eukaryota
- Kingdom: Animalia
- Phylum: Arthropoda
- Class: Insecta
- Order: Lepidoptera
- Family: Elachistidae
- Genus: Blastodacna
- Species: B. pyrigalla

Binomial name
- Blastodacna pyrigalla (Yang, 1977)

Synonyms
- Sinitinea pyrigalla Yang, 1977

Species of moth

Blastodacna pyrigalla, the pear shoot gall moth or pear fruit borer, is a moth in the family Elachistidae. It was described by Yang in 1977. It is found in Korea and China.

The larvae feed within galls on Prunus persica.
