= Pyroderces brosi =

Scientific classification
- Kingdom: Animalia
- Phylum: Arthropoda
- Clade: Pancrustacea
- Class: Insecta
- Order: Lepidoptera
- Family: Cosmopterigidae
- Genus: Pyroderces
- Species: P. brosi

Binomial name
- Pyroderces brosi Riedl, 1969

Species of moth

Pyroderces brosi is a moth in the family Cosmopterigidae. It is found in Italy.

The wingspan is about 13 mm. Adults have been recorded in June.
