= Blastodacna libanotica =

Scientific classification
- Domain: Eukaryota
- Kingdom: Animalia
- Phylum: Arthropoda
- Class: Insecta
- Order: Lepidoptera
- Family: Elachistidae
- Genus: Blastodacna
- Species: B. libanotica

Binomial name
- Blastodacna libanotica Diakonoff, 1939

Species of moth

Blastodacna libanotica is a moth in the family Elachistidae. It is found in Anatolia and the Near East.

The wingspan is 14–15 mm.
