= Anatrachyntis vanharteni =

Scientific classification
- Kingdom: Animalia
- Phylum: Arthropoda
- Clade: Pancrustacea
- Class: Insecta
- Order: Lepidoptera
- Family: Cosmopterigidae
- Genus: Anatrachyntis
- Species: A. vanharteni

Binomial name
- Anatrachyntis vanharteni Koster, 2010

Species of moth

Anatrachyntis vanharteni is a moth in the family Cosmopterigidae. It was described by Koster in 2010. It is found in the United Arab Emirates.
