= Pyroderces diplecta =

Scientific classification
- Kingdom: Animalia
- Phylum: Arthropoda
- Class: Insecta
- Order: Lepidoptera
- Family: Cosmopterigidae
- Genus: Pyroderces
- Species: P. diplecta

Binomial name
- Pyroderces diplecta Meyrick, 1935

Species of moth

Pyroderces diplecta is a moth in the family Cosmopterigidae. It is found in Sri Lanka.
