= Anatrachyntis lunulifera =

Scientific classification
- Kingdom: Animalia
- Phylum: Arthropoda
- Class: Insecta
- Order: Lepidoptera
- Family: Cosmopterigidae
- Genus: Anatrachyntis
- Species: A. lunulifera

Binomial name
- Anatrachyntis lunulifera (Meyrick, 1934)

Synonyms
- Pyroderces lunulifera Meyrick, 1934

Species of moth

Anatrachyntis lunulifera is a moth in the family Cosmopterigidae. It was described by Edward Meyrick in 1934, and is known from the Marquesas Archipelago.
