= Anatrachyntis amphisaris =

Scientific classification
- Kingdom: Animalia
- Phylum: Arthropoda
- Class: Insecta
- Order: Lepidoptera
- Family: Cosmopterigidae
- Genus: Anatrachyntis
- Species: A. amphisaris

Binomial name
- Anatrachyntis amphisaris (Meyrick, 1922)

Synonyms
- Pyroderces amphisaris Meyrick, 1922

Species of moth

Anatrachyntis amphisaris is a moth in the family Cosmopterigidae. It was described by Edward Meyrick in 1922, and is known from Sri Lanka.

This species has a wingspan of 10mm. The forewings are light pinkish-ochreous irregularly irrorated with blackish-grey; a transverse whitish streak at 1/4 preceded with blackish irrorations, a triangular dorsal blotch in the wing, outlined with ochreous-whitish suffusion.
