= Pyroderces melanosarca =

Scientific classification
- Kingdom: Animalia
- Phylum: Arthropoda
- Class: Insecta
- Order: Lepidoptera
- Family: Cosmopterigidae
- Genus: Pyroderces
- Species: P. melanosarca

Binomial name
- Pyroderces melanosarca Meyrick, 1937

Species of moth

Pyroderces melanosarca is a moth in the family Cosmopterigidae. It is found on Java.
