= Pyroderces tenuilinea =

Scientific classification
- Domain: Eukaryota
- Kingdom: Animalia
- Phylum: Arthropoda
- Class: Insecta
- Order: Lepidoptera
- Family: Cosmopterigidae
- Genus: Pyroderces
- Species: P. tenuilinea

Binomial name
- Pyroderces tenuilinea Turner, 1923

Species of moth

Pyroderces tenuilinea is a moth in the family Cosmopterigidae. It is found in Australia, where it has been recorded from Queensland.
