= Anatrachyntis sesamivora =

Scientific classification
- Kingdom: Animalia
- Phylum: Arthropoda
- Class: Insecta
- Order: Lepidoptera
- Family: Cosmopterigidae
- Genus: Anatrachyntis
- Species: A. sesamivora

Binomial name
- Anatrachyntis sesamivora (Meyrick, 1933)

Synonyms
- Pyroderces sesamivora Meyrick, 1933

Species of moth

Anatrachyntis sesamivora is a moth in the family Cosmopterigidae. It was described by Edward Meyrick in 1933, and is known from Java, Indonesia.
