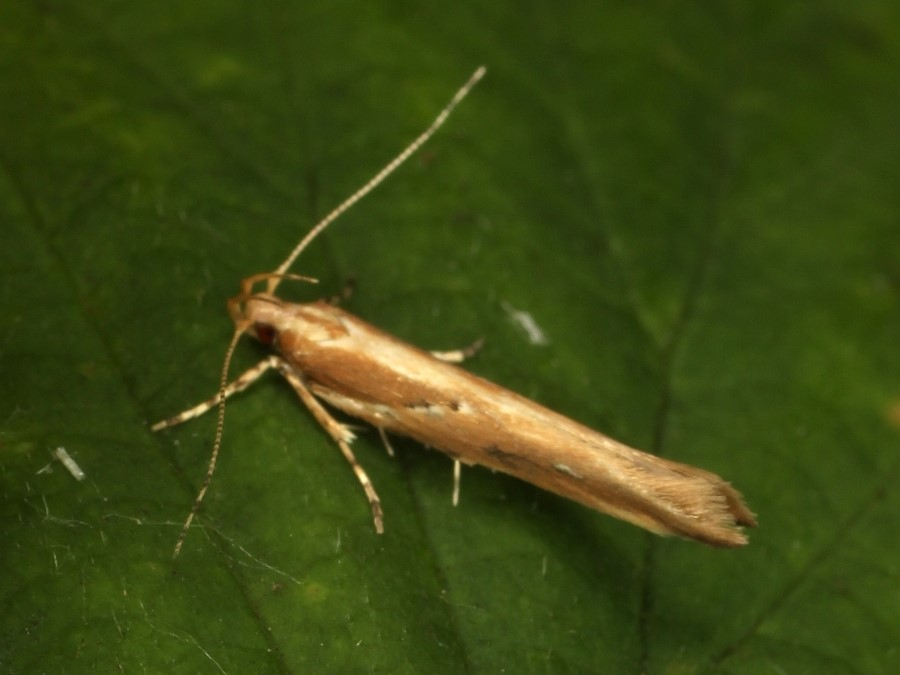

Scientific classification
- Kingdom: Animalia
- Phylum: Arthropoda
- Class: Insecta
- Order: Lepidoptera
- Family: Cosmopterigidae
- Genus: Pyroderces
- Species: P. sarcogypsa

Binomial name
- Pyroderces sarcogypsa (Meyrick, 1932)

Synonyms
- Labdia sarcogypsa Meyrick, 1932

= Pyroderces sarcogypsa =

Species of moth

Pyroderces sarcogypsa is a species of moth in the family Cosmopterigidae first described by Edward Meyrick in 1932. It is found in Japan, the Russian Far East and the Chinese provinces of Fujian, Guizhou and Jiangxi.

The wingspan is 13–15 mm.
