= Anatrachyntis bicincta =

Scientific classification
- Domain: Eukaryota
- Kingdom: Animalia
- Phylum: Arthropoda
- Class: Insecta
- Order: Lepidoptera
- Family: Cosmopterigidae
- Genus: Anatrachyntis
- Species: A. bicincta

Binomial name
- Anatrachyntis bicincta (Ghesquière, 1940)

Synonyms
- Pyroderces bicincta Ghesquière, 1940

Species of moth

Anatrachyntis bicincta is a moth in the family Cosmopterigidae. It was described by Jean Ghesquière in 1940 and is known from the Democratic Republic of the Congo.
