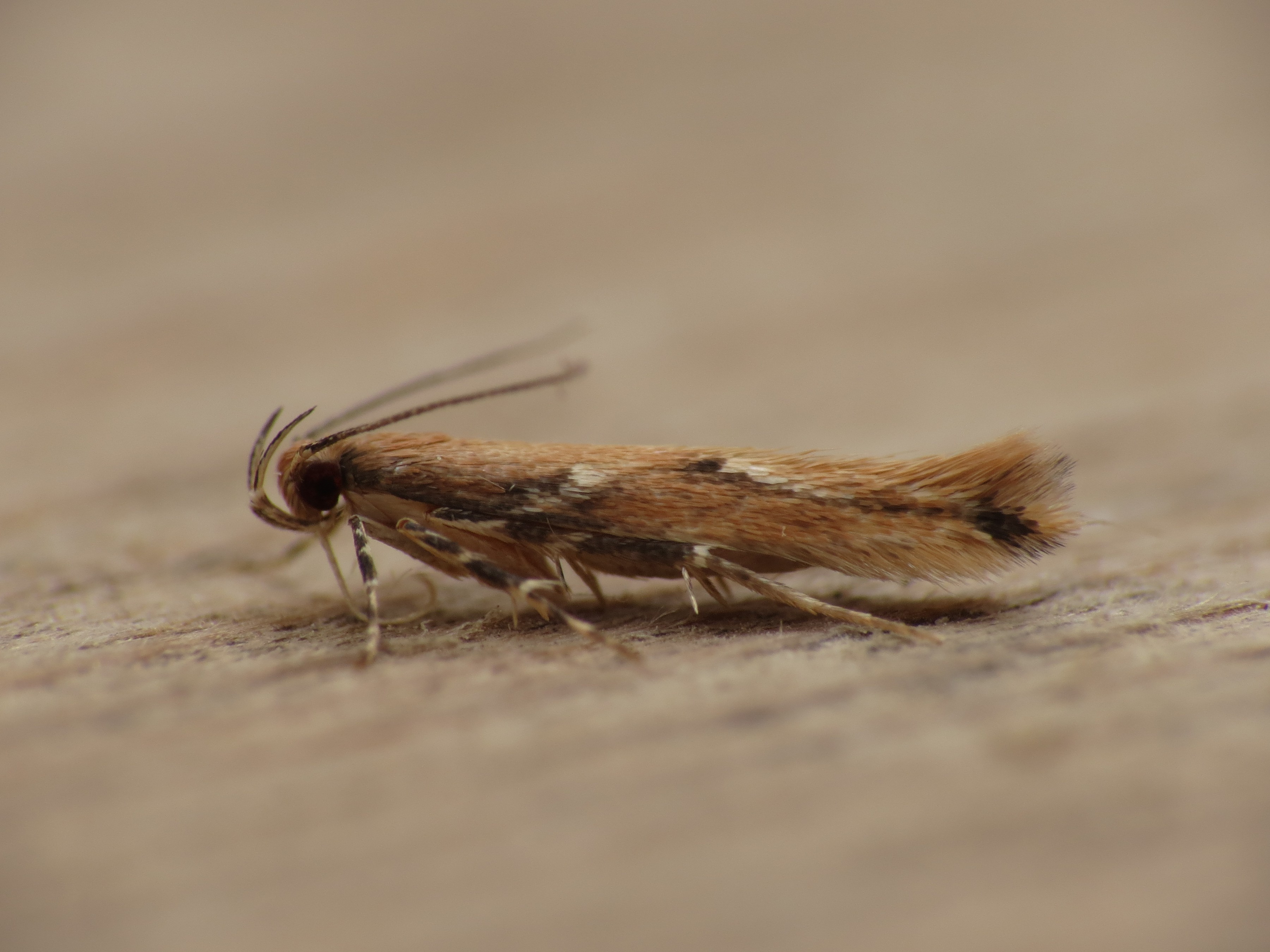

Scientific classification
- Kingdom: Animalia
- Phylum: Arthropoda
- Clade: Pancrustacea
- Class: Insecta
- Order: Lepidoptera
- Family: Cosmopterigidae
- Genus: Pyroderces
- Species: P. wolschrijni

Binomial name
- Pyroderces wolschrijni Koster & Sinev, 2003

= Pyroderces wolschrijni =

Species of moth in the family Cosmopterigidae

Pyroderces wolschrijni is a moth in the family Cosmopterigidae. It is found in Spain, Morocco and on Malta. It has also been recorded from Crete, Sicily and the United Arab Emirates.

The wingspan is 7–11 millimetres (0.28–0.43 in). Adults are on wing from mid April to mid May and again from early July to mid October. There are probably two generations per year.
