= Blastodacna lvovskyi =

Scientific classification
- Kingdom: Animalia
- Phylum: Arthropoda
- Clade: Pancrustacea
- Class: Insecta
- Order: Lepidoptera
- Family: Elachistidae
- Genus: Blastodacna
- Species: B. lvovskyi

Binomial name
- Blastodacna lvovskyi Sinev, 1986

Species of moth

Blastodacna lvovskyi is a moth in the family Elachistidae. It is found in Tajikistan.
