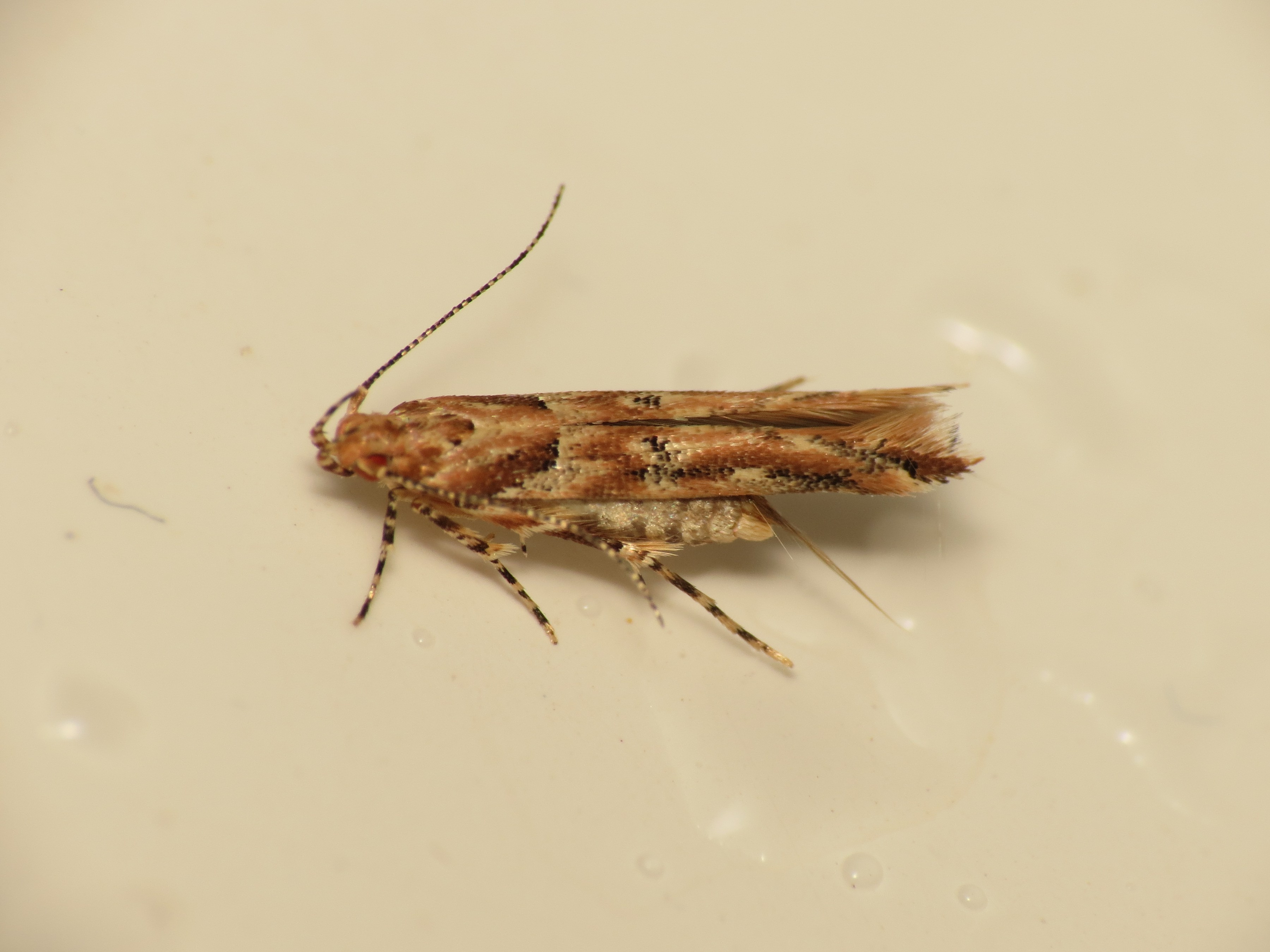

Scientific classification
- Kingdom: Animalia
- Phylum: Arthropoda
- Clade: Pancrustacea
- Class: Insecta
- Order: Lepidoptera
- Family: Cosmopterigidae
- Genus: Anatrachyntis
- Species: A. badia

Binomial name
- Anatrachyntis badia (Hodges, 1962)

Synonyms
- Sathrobrota badia Hodges, 1962; Pyroderces badia

= Anatrachyntis badia =

Species of moth

Anatrachyntis badia, the Florida pink scavenger, is a species of moth of the family Cosmopterigidae. It was first described by Ronald W. Hodges in 1962. It is found in the southern United States from Florida to California and as far north as Maryland. It is an introduced species in Europe, where it has been recorded infrequently from Italy, Greece, Spain, Malta, the United Kingdom, Poland and Turkey through accidental importation in pomegranates. In Germany, it was first recorded in 2011 in a tropical greenhouse in a zoological garden, where caterpillars where found living in colonies of the mealybug Palmicultor lumpurensis on bamboo. It has also been recorded from Hawaii.

The wingspan is 9–10 mm (0.35–0.39 in).

The larvae are mainly scavengers, feeding on dry or decaying fruit, dead floral parts, and sooty mold among fruit clusters and under sepals. The larvae have been recorded feeding on cones of several species of Pinus and Cassia pods, dead fruits of peach and loquat, lime, grapefruit, banana, cabbage, coconut blossoms and elm leaves. During summer, larvae may nibble on rind of ripe oranges, often near the stem end or on the sides of fruit in a cluster. The feeding is usually superficial and does not cause appreciable damage.
