= Anatrachyntis euryspora =

Scientific classification
- Kingdom: Animalia
- Phylum: Arthropoda
- Class: Insecta
- Order: Lepidoptera
- Family: Cosmopterigidae
- Genus: Anatrachyntis
- Species: A. euryspora

Binomial name
- Anatrachyntis euryspora (Meyrick, 1922)

Synonyms
- Pyroderces euryspora Meyrick, 1922

Species of moth

Anatrachyntis euryspora is a moth in the family Cosmopterigidae. It was described by Edward Meyrick in 1922, and is known from Fiji.
