= Pyroderces urantha =

Scientific classification
- Kingdom: Animalia
- Phylum: Arthropoda
- Class: Insecta
- Order: Lepidoptera
- Family: Cosmopterigidae
- Genus: Pyroderces
- Species: P. urantha

Binomial name
- Pyroderces urantha (Meyrick, 1914)

Synonyms
- Stagmatophora urantha Meyrick, 1914

Species of moth

Pyroderces urantha is a moth in the family Cosmopterigidae. It is found in Taiwan.
