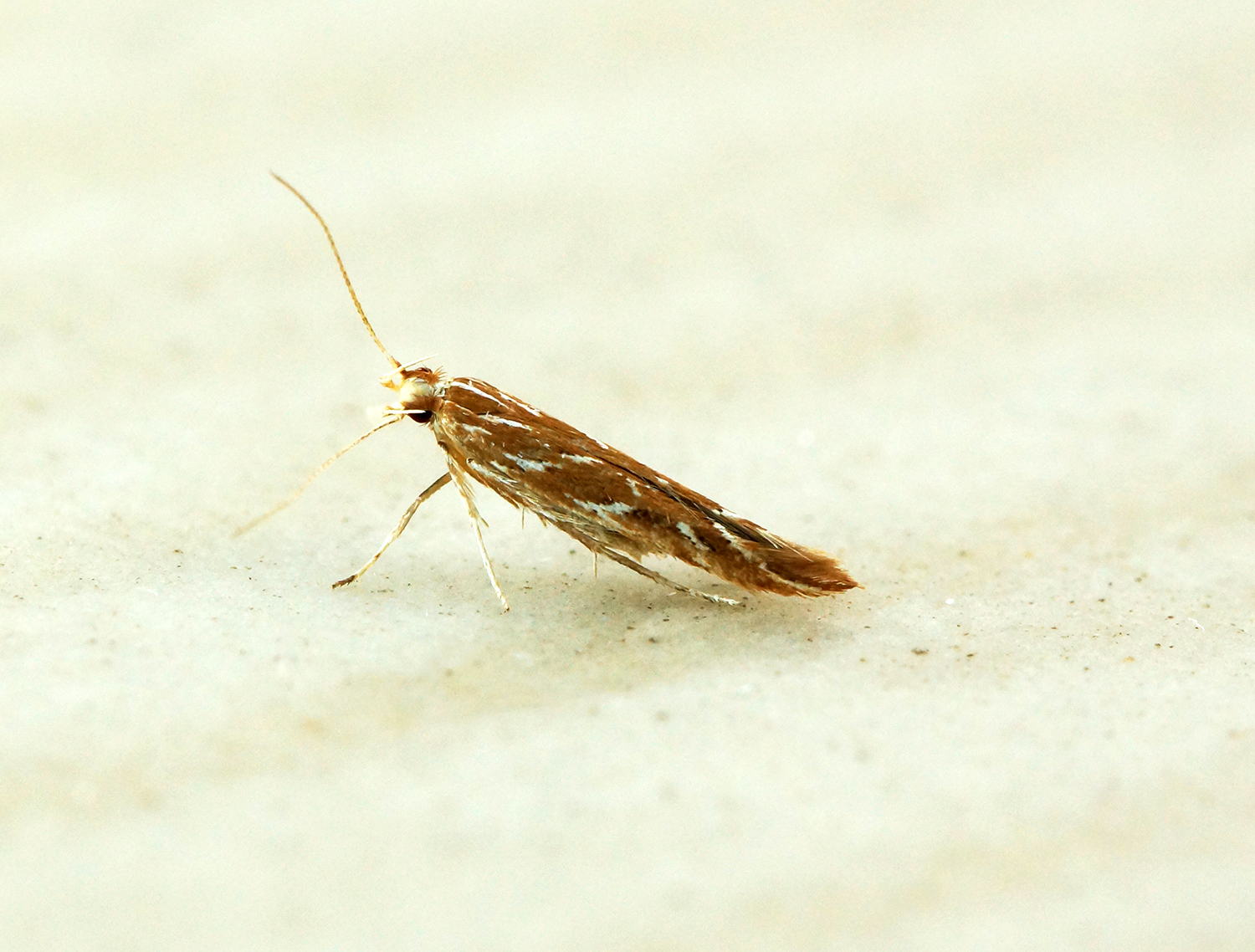

Scientific classification
- Kingdom: Animalia
- Phylum: Arthropoda
- Clade: Pancrustacea
- Class: Insecta
- Order: Lepidoptera
- Family: Cosmopterigidae
- Genus: Pyroderces
- Species: P. argyrogrammos

Binomial name
- Pyroderces argyrogrammos (Zeller, 1847)

Synonyms
- Cosmopteryx argyrogrammos Zeller, 1847; Pyroderces goldeggiella Herrich-Schäffer, 1853

= Pyroderces argyrogrammos =

Species of moth

Pyroderces argyrogrammos is a moth in the family Cosmopterigidae. It is found from central Europe south to the Mediterranean area, the Canary Islands, North Africa, the Middle East, Central Asia and China. It has recently also been recorded on the Channel Islands.

The wingspan is 11–17 mm. Adults are on wing two generations from the end of April to the end of September. A third generation can occur in warm seasons.

The larvae feed on the seed heads of various Asteraceae species, including Carlina, Centaurea and Carduus species.
