= Anatrachyntis mythologica =

Scientific classification
- Kingdom: Animalia
- Phylum: Arthropoda
- Class: Insecta
- Order: Lepidoptera
- Family: Cosmopterigidae
- Genus: Anatrachyntis
- Species: A. mythologica

Binomial name
- Anatrachyntis mythologica (Meyrick, 1917)

Synonyms
- Pyroderces mythologica Meyrick, 1917

Species of moth

Anatrachyntis mythologica is a moth in the family Cosmopterigidae. It was described by Edward Meyrick in 1917, and is known from Sri Lanka.
