= Anatrachyntis gymnocentra =

Scientific classification
- Kingdom: Animalia
- Phylum: Arthropoda
- Class: Insecta
- Order: Lepidoptera
- Family: Cosmopterigidae
- Genus: Anatrachyntis
- Species: A. gymnocentra

Binomial name
- Anatrachyntis gymnocentra (Meyrick, 1937)

Synonyms
- Pyroderces gymnocentra Meyrick, 1937

Species of moth

Anatrachyntis gymnocentra is a moth in the family Cosmopterigidae. It was described by Edward Meyrick in 1937 and is known from the Democratic Republic of the Congo.
