= Anatrachyntis oxyptila =

Scientific classification
- Kingdom: Animalia
- Phylum: Arthropoda
- Class: Insecta
- Order: Lepidoptera
- Family: Cosmopterigidae
- Genus: Anatrachyntis
- Species: A. oxyptila

Binomial name
- Anatrachyntis oxyptila (Meyrick, 1928)

Synonyms
- Pyroderces oxyptila Meyrick, 1928

Species of moth

Anatrachyntis oxyptila is a moth in the family Cosmopterigidae. It was described by Edward Meyrick in 1928, and is known from New Ireland.
