= Anatrachyntis coridophaga =

Scientific classification
- Kingdom: Animalia
- Phylum: Arthropoda
- Class: Insecta
- Order: Lepidoptera
- Family: Cosmopterigidae
- Genus: Anatrachyntis
- Species: A. coridophaga

Binomial name
- Anatrachyntis coridophaga (Meyrick, 1925)

Synonyms
- Pyroderces coridophaga Meyrick, 1925; Heinemannia pygmaella Turati, 1927

Species of moth

Anatrachyntis coridophaga is a moth in the family Cosmopterigidae. It is found in Egypt and Libya.

The wingspan is about 9 mm. Adults have been recorded on wing in April, July and October.

The larvae feed on the buds of Hibiscus species.
