= Anatrachyntis floretella =

Scientific classification
- Domain: Eukaryota
- Kingdom: Animalia
- Phylum: Arthropoda
- Class: Insecta
- Order: Lepidoptera
- Family: Cosmopterigidae
- Genus: Anatrachyntis
- Species: A. floretella

Binomial name
- Anatrachyntis floretella (Legrand, 1958)

Synonyms
- Stagmatophora floretella Legrand, 1958

Species of moth

Anatrachyntis floretella is a moth in the family Cosmopterigidae. It was described by Henry Legrand in 1958, and is known from Seychelles.
