= Pyroderces narcota =

Scientific classification
- Kingdom: Animalia
- Phylum: Arthropoda
- Class: Insecta
- Order: Lepidoptera
- Family: Cosmopterigidae
- Genus: Pyroderces
- Species: P. narcota

Binomial name
- Pyroderces narcota (Meyrick, 1909)

Synonyms
- Stagmatophora narcota Meyrick, 1909

Species of moth

Pyroderces narcota is a moth in the family Cosmopterigidae. It is found in South Africa.
