= Pyroderces klimeschi =

Scientific classification
- Domain: Eukaryota
- Kingdom: Animalia
- Phylum: Arthropoda
- Class: Insecta
- Order: Lepidoptera
- Family: Cosmopterigidae
- Genus: Pyroderces
- Species: P. klimeschi

Binomial name
- Pyroderces klimeschi Rebel, 1938

Species of moth

Pyroderces klimeschi is a moth in the family Cosmopterigidae. It is found in Poland, the Czech Republic, Slovakia, Austria, Hungary, Romania and Italy.

The wingspan is 15–17 mm. Adults have been recorded in May and June.
