= Pyroderces ocreella =

Scientific classification
- Kingdom: Animalia
- Phylum: Arthropoda
- Class: Insecta
- Order: Lepidoptera
- Family: Cosmopterigidae
- Genus: Pyroderces
- Species: P. ocreella

Binomial name
- Pyroderces ocreella Viette, 1955

Species of moth

Pyroderces ocreella is a moth in the family Cosmopterigidae. It is found in Madagascar.

This species has a wingspan of 12mm and a winglength of 5.5mm. The forewings are ochreous and the base black.
