= Blastodacna vinolentella =

Scientific classification
- Domain: Eukaryota
- Kingdom: Animalia
- Phylum: Arthropoda
- Class: Insecta
- Order: Lepidoptera
- Family: Elachistidae
- Genus: Blastodacna
- Species: B. vinolentella

Binomial name
- Blastodacna vinolentella (Herrich-Schäffer, 1854)

Synonyms
- Tebenna vinolentella Herrich-Schäffer, 1854

Species of moth

Blastodacna vinolentella is a moth in the family Elachistidae. It is found in central and southern Europe, from the Netherlands to Greece.

The wingspan is 9–12 mm. Adults are on wing from the beginning of June to the beginning of August.

The larvae possibly feed on Vitis vinifera.
