= Pyroderces tethysella =

Scientific classification
- Kingdom: Animalia
- Phylum: Arthropoda
- Clade: Pancrustacea
- Class: Insecta
- Order: Lepidoptera
- Family: Cosmopterigidae
- Genus: Pyroderces
- Species: P. tethysella

Binomial name
- Pyroderces tethysella Koster & Sinev, 2003

Species of moth

Pyroderces tethysella is a moth in the family Cosmopterigidae. It is found in Spain, Tunisia and Tajikistan.

The wingspan is 9–12 millimetres (0.35–0.47 in). Adults have been recorded from mid August to the beginning of October.
