= Anatrachyntis tentoria =

Scientific classification
- Kingdom: Animalia
- Phylum: Arthropoda
- Class: Insecta
- Order: Lepidoptera
- Family: Cosmopterigidae
- Genus: Anatrachyntis
- Species: A. tentoria

Binomial name
- Anatrachyntis tentoria (Meyrick, 1911)

Synonyms
- Stagmatophora tentoria Meyrick, 1911; Labdia tentoria

Species of moth

Anatrachyntis tentoria is a moth in the family Cosmopterigidae. It was described by Edward Meyrick in 1911, and is known from the Seychelles and the Chagos Archipelago.
