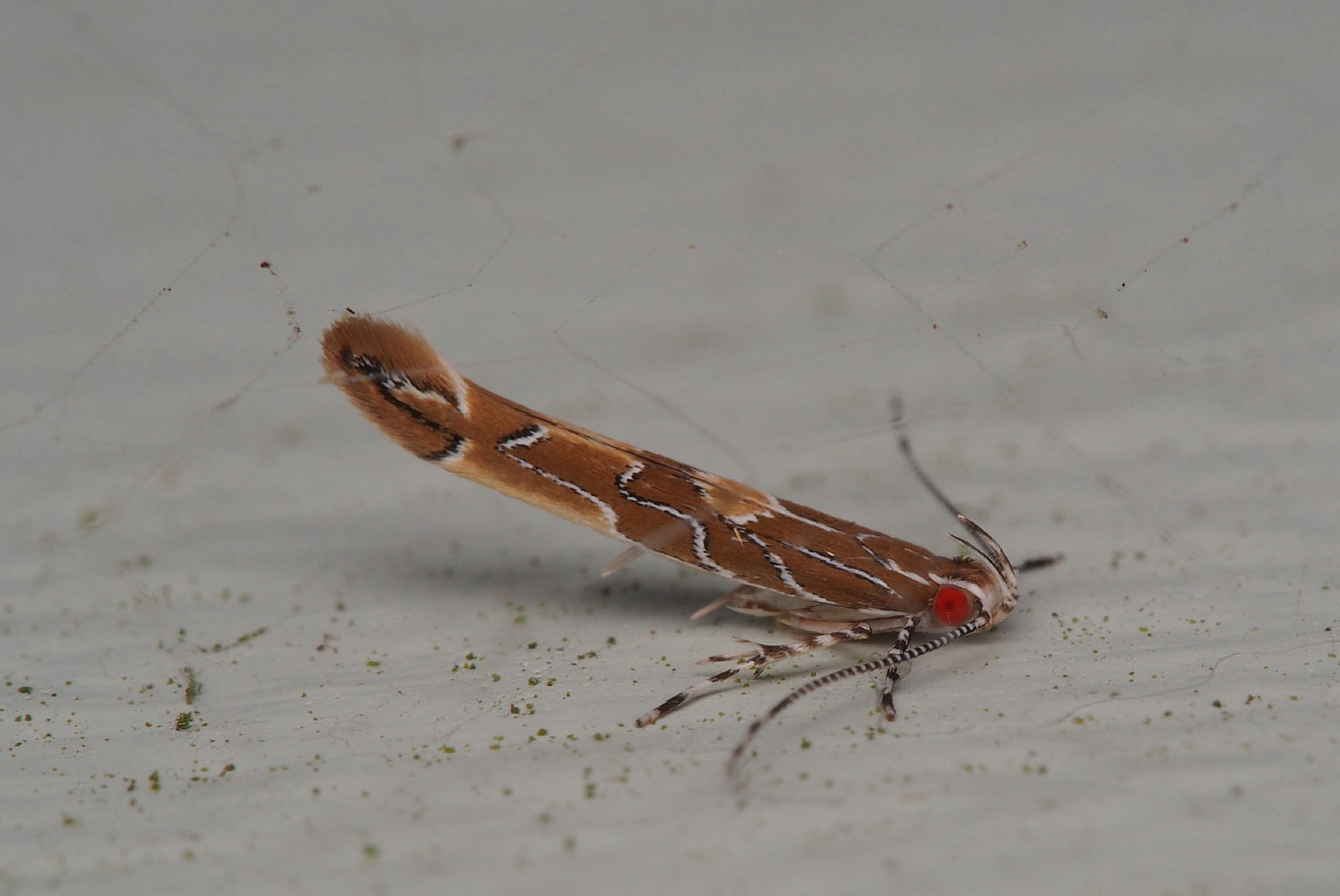

Scientific classification
- Kingdom: Animalia
- Phylum: Arthropoda
- Clade: Pancrustacea
- Class: Insecta
- Order: Lepidoptera
- Family: Cosmopterigidae
- Genus: Pyroderces
- Species: P. apparitella

Binomial name
- Pyroderces apparitella (Walker, 1864)

Synonyms
- Gelechia apparitella Walker, 1864; Proterocosma apparitella (Walker, 1864); Anatrachyntis apparitella (Walker, 1864)

= Pyroderces apparitella =

Species of moth

Pyroderces apparitella is a species of moth in the family Cosmopterigidae. It is endemic to New Zealand and has been observed in the North Island where it is regarded by some as being not common. The preferred habitat of this species is native forests and residential gardens. Adults are on the wing in December and January and the species is attracted to light.

== Taxonomy ==
This species was first described by Francis Walker in 1864 using a female specimen obtained from D. Bolton in Auckland and named Gelechia apparitella. The holotype specimen is held at the Natural History Museum, London. In 1889 Edward Meyrick placed this species within the genus Proterocosma. However, in 1928 George Hudson discussed and illustrated the species under the name Pyroderces apparitella. John S. Dugdale affirmed the placement of this species in the genus Pyroderces in 1988. In 2019, in a publication by Alan Emmerson & Robert Hoare, this species was referred to as Pyroderces (s.l.) apparitella, indicating that the authors had doubt about the placement of this species within that genus.

== Description ==
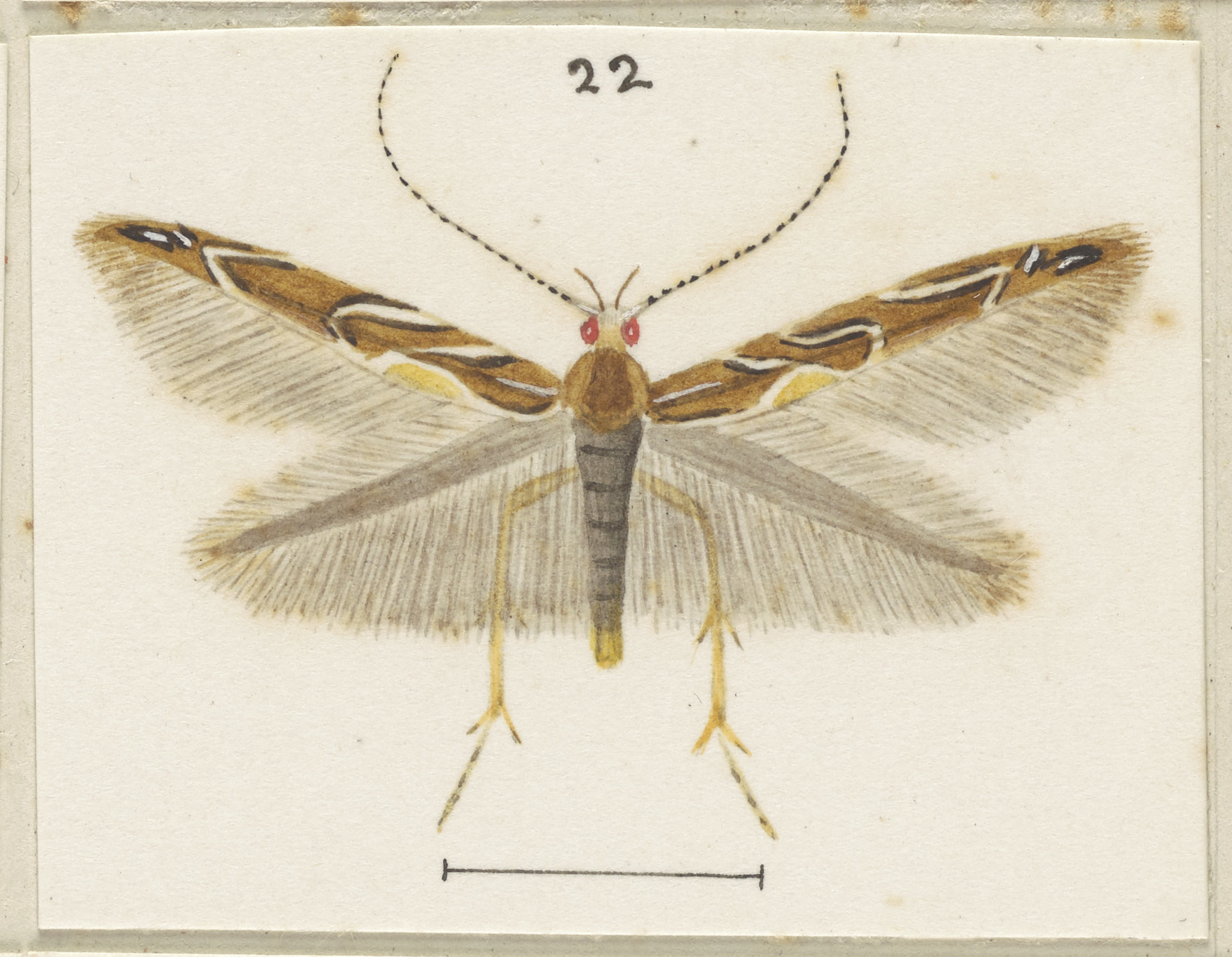

Walker described the species as follows:

Gilded ochraceous, slender. Head in front and under side silvery whitish. Palpi smooth, very slender, more than thrice longer than the breadth of the head; third joint setiform, as long as the second. Antennae slender, silvery white, shorter than the fore wings, with a black ring on each joint. Tibiae and tarsi with gilded bands. Fore wings with a silvery white line extending from the base towards a transverse outwardly and very acutely angular white line; two more exterior oblique white black-bordered lines, the first forming two angles, the second forming an outward acute and very prominent angle; two longitudinal subapical streaks, one black, the other white. Hind wings cinereous-aeneous. Length of the body 3 lines; of the wings 9 lines.

== Distribution ==
This species is endemic to New Zealand. It is found in the North Island. This species was observed in areas near Napier and Hastings in the early 1970s but was regarded as not common. It has also been recorded in North Auckland but only rarely. It has also been observed in Wellington.

== Behaviour and biology ==
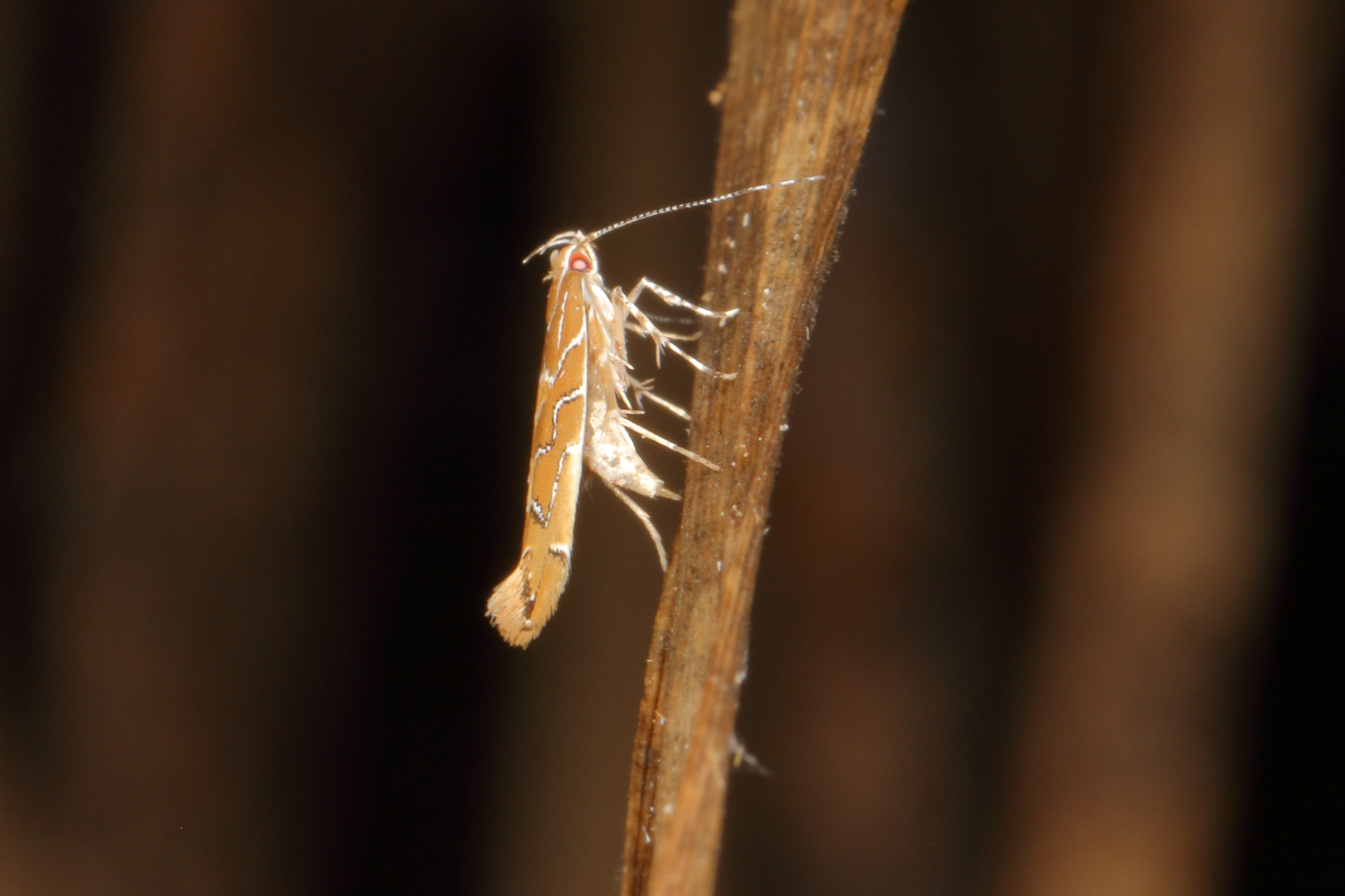
P. apparitella ovipositing on dead cabbage tree leaves.

It is on the wing in December and January. This species has been observed via light trapping indicating it is attracted to light. When resting the wings of this species lay close to its body forming a sharp point.

== Habitat and host species ==
This species inhabits native forests and residential gardens.
