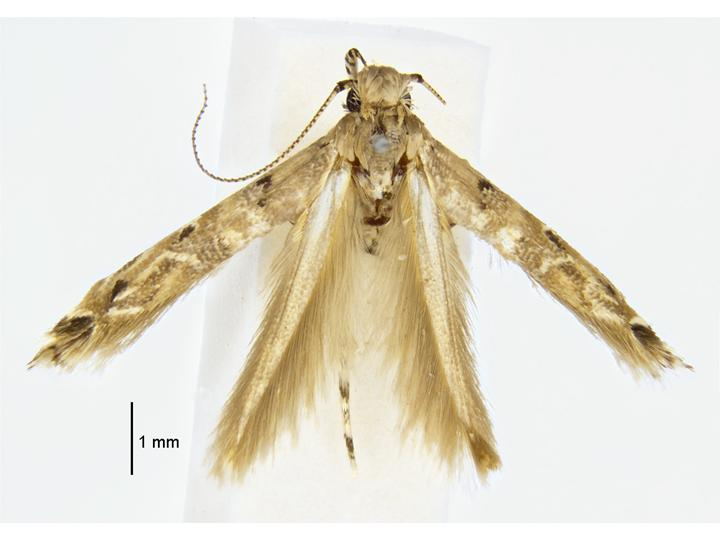

Scientific classification
- Kingdom: Animalia
- Phylum: Arthropoda
- Class: Insecta
- Order: Lepidoptera
- Family: Cosmopterigidae
- Genus: Anatrachyntis
- Species: A. megacentra

Binomial name
- Anatrachyntis megacentra (Meyrick, 1923)

Synonyms
- Pyroderces megacentra Meyrick, 1923

= Anatrachyntis megacentra =

Species of moth

Anatrachyntis megacentra is a moth in the family Cosmopterigidae. It was described by Edward Meyrick in 1923, and is known from Fiji and the Cook Islands
