= Anatrachyntis exagria =

Scientific classification
- Kingdom: Animalia
- Phylum: Arthropoda
- Class: Insecta
- Order: Lepidoptera
- Family: Cosmopterigidae
- Genus: Anatrachyntis
- Species: A. exagria

Binomial name
- Anatrachyntis exagria Meyrick, 1915

Synonyms
- Pyroderces exagria (Meyrick, 1915)

Species of moth

Anatrachyntis exagria is a moth in the family Cosmopterigidae. It was described by Edward Meyrick in 1915, and is known from India.
