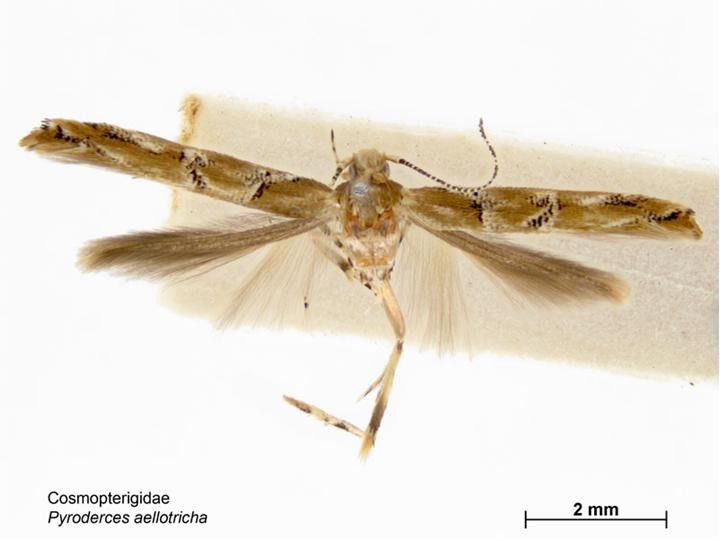
- P. aellotricha specimen (abdomen missing); Scale bar = 2 mm

Scientific classification
- Kingdom: Animalia
- Phylum: Arthropoda
- Clade: Pancrustacea
- Class: Insecta
- Order: Lepidoptera
- Family: Cosmopterigidae
- Subfamily: Cosmopteriginae
- Genus: Pyroderces; Herrich-Schäffer, 1853

Type species
- Pyroderces goldeggiella Herrich-Schäffer, 1853

Diversity
- 87, but see text

Synonyms
- Lallia Chrétien, 1915; Tenuipenna Amsel, 1959; Syntomactis Meyrick, 1889

= Pyroderces =

Genus of moths

Pyroderces is a genus of cosmet moths (family Cosmopterigidae). It belongs to subfamily Cosmopteriginae. Some authors include Anatrachyntis here.

== Species ==
- Pyroderces aellotricha
- Pyroderces albistrigella (Möschler, 1890)
- Pyroderces anthinopa
- Pyroderces apicinotella (Chrétien, 1915) (type species of Lallia)
- Pyroderces apparitella (Walker, 1864)
- Pyroderces argentata
- Pyroderces argobalana Meyrick, 1915
- Pyroderces argyrogrammos
- Pyroderces bifurcata Z.W.Zhang & H.H.Li, 2009
- Pyroderces brosi
- Pyroderces caesaris
- Pyroderces cervinella
- Pyroderces chalcoptila
- Pyroderces deamatella (Walker, 1864) (type species of Syntomactis)
- Pyroderces dimidiella (Snellen, 1885)
- Pyroderces diplecta
- Pyroderces eupogon Turner, 1926
- Pyroderces firma
- Pyroderces hapalodes Turner, 1923
- Pyroderces jonesella
- Pyroderces klimeschi
- Pyroderces leptarga
- Pyroderces longalitella
- Pyroderces melanosarca
- Pyroderces narcota
- Pyroderces nephelopyrrha
- Pyroderces ocreella
- Pyroderces orientella Sinev, 1993
- Pyroderces sarcogypsa
- Pyroderces sphenosema
- Pyroderces spix Bippus, 2020
- Pyroderces syngalactis
- Pyroderces tenuilinea Turner, 1923
- Pyroderces tersectella
- Pyroderces tethysella
- Pyroderces urantha
- Pyroderces wolschrijni
- Pyroderces phaeostigma
- Pyroderces pogonias Turner, 1923
