= Blastodacna curvilineella =

Scientific classification
- Kingdom: Animalia
- Phylum: Arthropoda
- Clade: Pancrustacea
- Class: Insecta
- Order: Lepidoptera
- Family: Elachistidae
- Genus: Blastodacna
- Species: B. curvilineella

Binomial name
- Blastodacna curvilineella (Chambers, 1872)

Synonyms
- Gelechia curvilineella Chambers, 1872; Elachista curvilineella; Batrachedra curvilineella

Species of moth

Blastodacna curvilineella is a moth in the family Elachistidae. It was described by Vactor Tousey Chambers in 1872. It is found in North America, where it has been recorded from Kentucky, Maine, Ontario and Quebec.

The wings are dusky grey, sprinkled with hoary (white or grey) and there is a hoary spot on each side of the thorax above the wings. There are two or three indistinct, dusky longitudinal short streaks on the wings. Adults are on wing from May to July.

The larvae have been recorded feeding on Crataegus species.
