= Anatrachyntis biorrhizae =

Scientific classification
- Kingdom: Animalia
- Phylum: Arthropoda
- Clade: Pancrustacea
- Class: Insecta
- Order: Lepidoptera
- Family: Cosmopterigidae
- Genus: Anatrachyntis
- Species: A. biorrhizae

Binomial name
- Anatrachyntis biorrhizae Sinev, 1986

Synonyms
- Pyroderces biorrhizae Sinev, 1986

Species of moth

Anatrachyntis biorrhizae is a moth in the family Cosmopterigidae. It was described by Sinev in 1986, and is known from Russia.
