= Blastodacna erebopis =

Scientific classification
- Domain: Eukaryota
- Kingdom: Animalia
- Phylum: Arthropoda
- Class: Insecta
- Order: Lepidoptera
- Family: Elachistidae
- Genus: Blastodacna
- Species: B. erebopis

Binomial name
- Blastodacna erebopis Meyrick, 1934

Species of moth

Blastodacna erebopis is a moth in the family Elachistidae. It is found on Java.

The larvae feed on Terminalia edulis.
