= Pyroderces firma =

Scientific classification
- Kingdom: Animalia
- Phylum: Arthropoda
- Class: Insecta
- Order: Lepidoptera
- Family: Cosmopterigidae
- Genus: Pyroderces
- Species: P. firma

Binomial name
- Pyroderces firma (Meyrick, 1911)

Synonyms
- Syntomactis firma Meyrick, 1911

Species of moth

Pyroderces firma is a moth in the family Cosmopterigidae. It is found on the Seychelles and possibly the Democratic Republic of Congo.
