= Pyroderces orientella =

Scientific classification
- Kingdom: Animalia
- Phylum: Arthropoda
- Clade: Pancrustacea
- Class: Insecta
- Order: Lepidoptera
- Family: Cosmopterigidae
- Genus: Pyroderces
- Species: P. orientella

Binomial name
- Pyroderces orientella Sinev, 1993

Species of moth

Pyroderces orientella is a moth in the family Cosmopterigidae. It is found in Russia.
