= Anatrachyntis simplex =

Scientific classification
- Domain: Eukaryota
- Kingdom: Animalia
- Phylum: Arthropoda
- Class: Insecta
- Order: Lepidoptera
- Family: Cosmopterigidae
- Genus: Anatrachyntis
- Species: A. simplex

Binomial name
- Anatrachyntis simplex (Walsingham, 1891)

Synonyms
- Pyroderces simplex Walsingham, 1891; Amneris flexiloquella Riedl, 1993; Stagmatophora gossypiella Walsingham, 1906; Anatrachyntis hemizopha Meyrick, 1916; Anatrachyntis repandatella (Legrand, 1966)

Species of moth

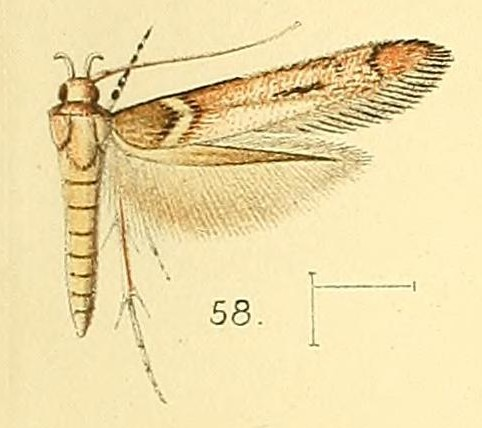
Anatrachyntis simplex

Anatrachyntis simplex is a moth in the family Cosmopterigidae. It is found on Egypt, La Réunion, Gambia and the United Arab Emirates, Cyprus, Morocco, Portugal, Spain, India and China. It is recorded infrequently in the United Kingdom through accidental importation in pomegranates.

The wingspan is about 10 mm. In Europe, adults have been recorded in August and October. In the tropics there are multiple generations per year.

The larvae feed within the fruit of pomegranates. In Africa they have also been recorded feeding on Elaeis guineensis (African oil palm) (Arecaceae), Zea mays (Poaceae), Gossypium sp. and Ceiba pentandra (Malvaceae), as well as flowers of Pandanus sp., and in the cattails of Typha domingensis (Typhaceae).
