= Pyroderces phaeostigma =

Scientific classification
- Domain: Eukaryota
- Kingdom: Animalia
- Phylum: Arthropoda
- Class: Insecta
- Order: Lepidoptera
- Family: Cosmopterigidae
- Genus: Pyroderces
- Species: P. phaeostigma

Binomial name
- Pyroderces phaeostigma Bradley, 1961

Species of moth

Pyroderces phaeostigma is a moth in the family Cosmopterigidae. It is found on Guadalcanal.
