= Pyroderces argentata =

Scientific classification
- Kingdom: Animalia
- Phylum: Arthropoda
- Clade: Pancrustacea
- Class: Insecta
- Order: Lepidoptera
- Family: Cosmopterigidae
- Genus: Pyroderces
- Species: P. argentata

Binomial name
- Pyroderces argentata Koster, 2010

Species of moth

Pyroderces argentata is a moth in the family Cosmopterigidae. It is found in the United Arab Emirates.
