= Anatrachyntis paroditis =

Scientific classification
- Kingdom: Animalia
- Phylum: Arthropoda
- Class: Insecta
- Order: Lepidoptera
- Family: Cosmopterigidae
- Genus: Anatrachyntis
- Species: A. paroditis

Binomial name
- Anatrachyntis paroditis (Meyrick, 1928)

Synonyms
- Pyroderces paroditis Meyrick, 1928

Species of moth

Anatrachyntis paroditis is a moth in the family Cosmopterigidae. It was described by Edward Meyrick in 1928, and is known from the Pacific, including Fiji, south-east Asia and the Seychelles.
