= Blastodacna mironovi =

Scientific classification
- Kingdom: Animalia
- Phylum: Arthropoda
- Clade: Pancrustacea
- Class: Insecta
- Order: Lepidoptera
- Family: Elachistidae
- Genus: Blastodacna
- Species: B. mironovi

Binomial name
- Blastodacna mironovi Sinev, 1989

Species of moth

Blastodacna mironovi is a moth in the family Elachistidae. It is found in Kyrgyzstan.
