= Blastodacna mandshurica =

Scientific classification
- Kingdom: Animalia
- Phylum: Arthropoda
- Clade: Pancrustacea
- Class: Insecta
- Order: Lepidoptera
- Family: Elachistidae
- Genus: Blastodacna
- Species: B. mandshurica

Binomial name
- Blastodacna mandshurica Sinev, 1988

Species of moth

Blastodacna mandshurica is a moth in the family Elachistidae. It is found in Russia.
