= Pyroderces hapalodes =

Scientific classification
- Domain: Eukaryota
- Kingdom: Animalia
- Phylum: Arthropoda
- Class: Insecta
- Order: Lepidoptera
- Family: Cosmopterigidae
- Genus: Pyroderces
- Species: P. hapalodes

Binomial name
- Pyroderces hapalodes Turner, 1923

Species of moth

Pyroderces hapalodes is a moth in the family Cosmopterigidae. It is located in Australia, where it has been recorded from Queensland.
