= Anatrachyntis centropecta =

Scientific classification
- Kingdom: Animalia
- Phylum: Arthropoda
- Class: Insecta
- Order: Lepidoptera
- Family: Cosmopterigidae
- Genus: Anatrachyntis
- Species: A. centropecta

Binomial name
- Anatrachyntis centropecta Meyrick, 1931

Synonyms
- Pyroderces centropecta

Species of moth

Anatrachyntis centropecta is a moth in the family Cosmopterigidae. It was described by Edward Meyrick in 1931, and is known from Peninsular Malaysia.
