= Anatrachyntis centrophanes =

Scientific classification
- Kingdom: Animalia
- Phylum: Arthropoda
- Class: Insecta
- Order: Lepidoptera
- Family: Cosmopterigidae
- Genus: Anatrachyntis
- Species: A. centrophanes

Binomial name
- Anatrachyntis centrophanes (Meyrick, 1915)

Synonyms
- Pyroderces centrophanes Meyrick, 1915

Species of moth

Anatrachyntis centrophanes is a moth in the family Cosmopterigidae. It was described by Edward Meyrick in 1915, and is known from India.
