= Pyroderces leptarga =

Scientific classification
- Kingdom: Animalia
- Phylum: Arthropoda
- Class: Insecta
- Order: Lepidoptera
- Family: Cosmopterigidae
- Genus: Pyroderces
- Species: P. leptarga

Binomial name
- Pyroderces leptarga (Meyrick, 1914)

Synonyms
- Stagmatophora leptarga Meyrick, 1914

Species of moth

Pyroderces leptarga is a moth in the family Cosmopterigidae. It is found in Taiwan.
