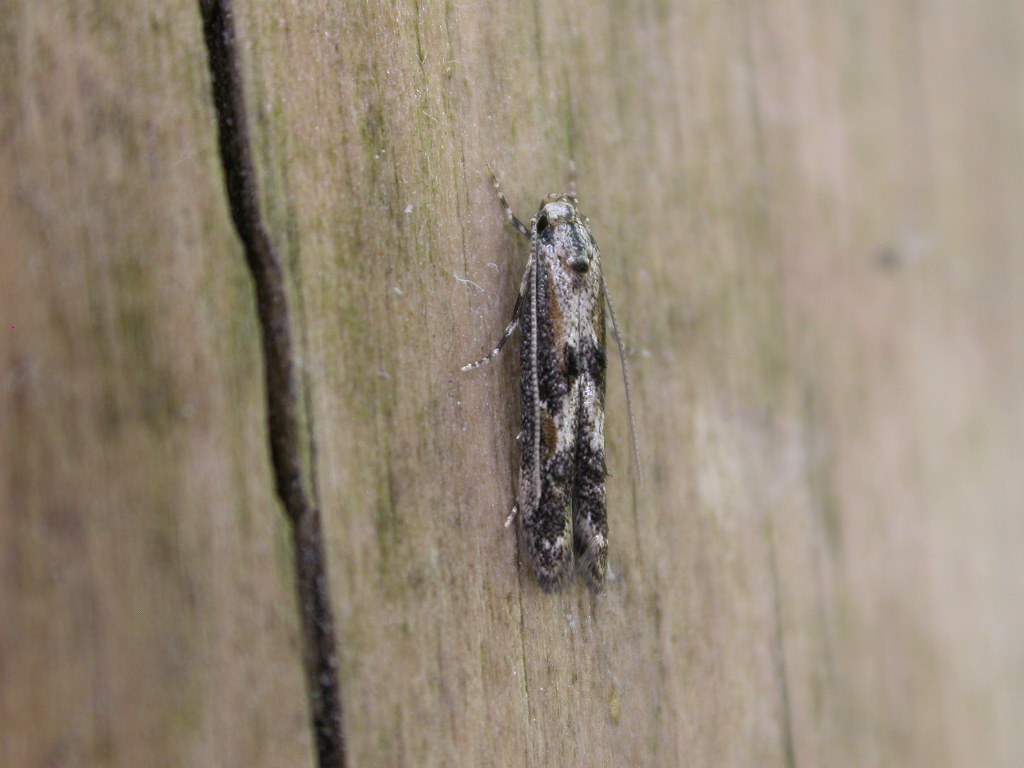

Scientific classification
- Domain: Eukaryota
- Kingdom: Animalia
- Phylum: Arthropoda
- Class: Insecta
- Order: Lepidoptera
- Family: Elachistidae
- Genus: Blastodacna
- Species: B. atra

Binomial name
- Blastodacna atra (Haworth, 1828)

Synonyms
- Recurvaria atra Haworth, 1828; Elachista putripennella Zeller 1839

= Blastodacna atra =

Apple pith moth

Species of moth

Blastodacna atra, the apple pith moth, is a moth of the family Elachistidae. It is known from most of Europe and it has been introduced to North America.

== Description ==
The wingspan is 11–13 mm. The head is white. Forewings are narrow, dark fuscous; a broad white dorsal streak, sprinkled with dark fuscous from base to tornus, with broad triangular indentation at 2/5, including a black scale-tuft; from apex of this streak a slender whitish fascia to costa before apex, emitting a branch posteriorly in middle and sometimes one anteriorly below it; a black scale-tuft in disc before this. Hindwings are grey.

Adults are on wing from May to September in western Europe.

The larvae mine inside young shoots of apples (Malus species) and can be found by looking for small heaps of frass. Occasionally there may be a small swelling and the young shoot may die off.

== Distribution ==
The apple pith moth is found in most of Europe. It is an introduced species in North America, where it has been recorded from Massachusetts and Ontario.
