= Anatrachyntis tripola =

Scientific classification
- Kingdom: Animalia
- Phylum: Arthropoda
- Class: Insecta
- Order: Lepidoptera
- Family: Cosmopterigidae
- Genus: Anatrachyntis
- Species: A. tripola

Binomial name
- Anatrachyntis tripola (Meyrick, 1909)

Synonyms
- Stagmatophora tripola Meyrick, 1909; Labdia tripola

Species of moth

Anatrachyntis tripola is a moth in the family Cosmopterigidae. It was described by Edward Meyrick in 1909, and is known from South Africa.
