= Anatrachyntis acris =

Scientific classification
- Kingdom: Animalia
- Phylum: Arthropoda
- Class: Insecta
- Order: Lepidoptera
- Family: Cosmopterigidae
- Genus: Anatrachyntis
- Species: A. acris

Binomial name
- Anatrachyntis acris (Meyrick, 1911)

Synonyms
- Stagmatophora acris Meyrick, 1911

Species of moth

Anatrachyntis acris is a moth in the family Cosmopterigidae. It was described by Edward Meyrick in 1911, and is known from the Seychelles.
