= Anatrachyntis cyma =

Scientific classification
- Domain: Eukaryota
- Kingdom: Animalia
- Phylum: Arthropoda
- Class: Insecta
- Order: Lepidoptera
- Family: Cosmopterigidae
- Genus: Anatrachyntis
- Species: A. cyma

Binomial name
- Anatrachyntis cyma (Bradley, 1953)

Synonyms
- Stagmatophora cyma Bradley, 1953; Pyroderces cyma

Species of moth

Anatrachyntis cyma is a moth in the family Cosmopterigidae. It was described by John David Bradley in 1953 and is known from Fiji.

This species has a wingspan of 15–18 mm.

The forewings are ochreous with pale ochreous and brownish wave-like markings, basal third is brown, outer edge outwardly oblique and outlined with black. A whitish-ochreous streak from base below costa and parallel to it.

== Biology ==
This species feeds on the flowers of Pandanus species.
