= Pyroderces albistrigella =

Scientific classification
- Domain: Eukaryota
- Kingdom: Animalia
- Phylum: Arthropoda
- Class: Insecta
- Order: Lepidoptera
- Family: Cosmopterigidae
- Genus: Pyroderces
- Species: P. albistrigella

Binomial name
- Pyroderces albistrigella (Möschler, 1890)

Synonyms
- Batrachedra albistrigella Möschler, 1890

Species of moth

Pyroderces albistrigella is a moth in the family Cosmopterigidae. It is found in North America, where it has been recorded from Florida and Mississippi. It is also found in the West Indies and Puerto Rico.

The wingspan is about 15 mm. Adults have been recorded on wing from May to October and in December.
