= Anatrachyntis orphnographa =

Scientific classification
- Kingdom: Animalia
- Phylum: Arthropoda
- Class: Insecta
- Order: Lepidoptera
- Family: Cosmopterigidae
- Genus: Anatrachyntis
- Species: A. orphnographa

Binomial name
- Anatrachyntis orphnographa (Meyrick, 1936)

Synonyms
- Pyroderces orphnographa Meyrick, 1936

Species of moth

Anatrachyntis orphnographa is a moth in the family Cosmopterigidae. It was described by Edward Meyrick in 1936, and is known from the Democratic Republic of the Congo.
