= Anatrachyntis hieroglypta =

Scientific classification
- Kingdom: Animalia
- Phylum: Arthropoda
- Class: Insecta
- Order: Lepidoptera
- Family: Cosmopterigidae
- Genus: Anatrachyntis
- Species: A. hieroglypta

Binomial name
- Anatrachyntis hieroglypta (Meyrick, 1911)

Synonyms
- Stagmatophora hieroglypta Meyrick, 1911

Species of moth

Anatrachyntis hieroglypta is a moth in the family Cosmopterigidae. It was described by Edward Meyrick in 1911, and is known from Seychelles.
