= Anatrachyntis risbeci =

Scientific classification
- Kingdom: Animalia
- Phylum: Arthropoda
- Class: Insecta
- Order: Lepidoptera
- Family: Cosmopterigidae
- Genus: Anatrachyntis
- Species: A. risbeci

Binomial name
- Anatrachyntis risbeci (Ghesquière, 1940)

Synonyms
- Pyroderces risbeci Ghesquière, 1940

Species of moth

Anatrachyntis risbeci is a moth in the family Cosmopterigidae. It was described by Jean Ghesquière in 1940 and is known from Senegal.
