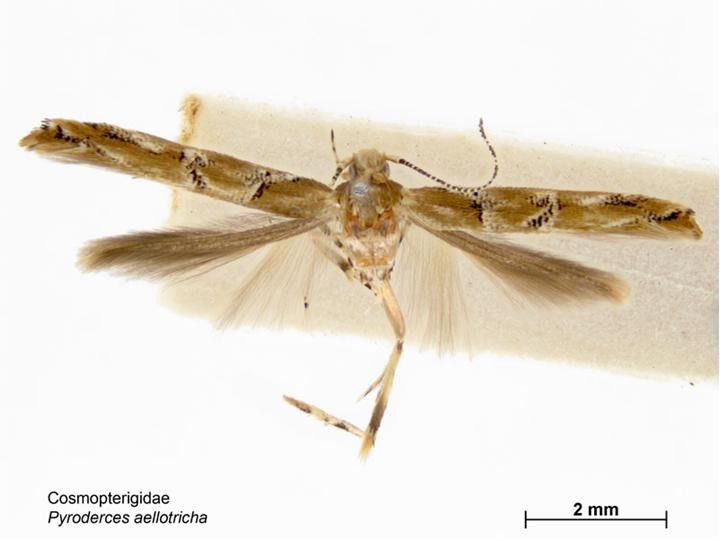
- Dorsal view
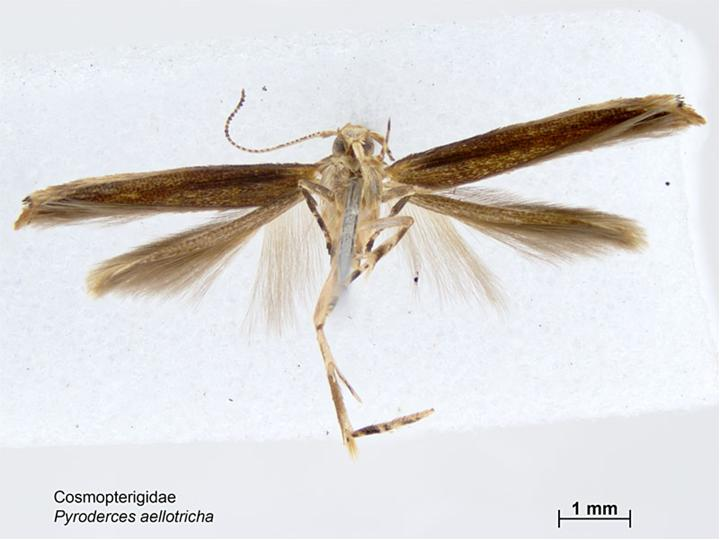
- Ventral view

Scientific classification
- Kingdom: Animalia
- Phylum: Arthropoda
- Clade: Pancrustacea
- Class: Insecta
- Order: Lepidoptera
- Family: Cosmopterigidae
- Genus: Pyroderces
- Species: P. aellotricha

Binomial name
- Pyroderces aellotricha (Meyrick, 1889)

Synonyms
- Proterocosma aellotricha Meyrick, 1889

= Pyroderces aellotricha =

Species of moth

Pyroderces aellotricha, also known as the Cosmet moth, is a moth of the family Cosmopterigidae. It is found in New Zealand, in Australia and the Cook Islands.

== Taxonomy ==
This species was first described by Edward Meyrick in 1889 and named Proterocosma aellotricha. Meyrick, when first describing the species, used two specimens collected in Hamilton in January. In 1915 Meyrick placed this species within the genus Pyroderces. The female lectotype, collected in Hamilton, is held at the Natural History Museum, London.

== Description ==
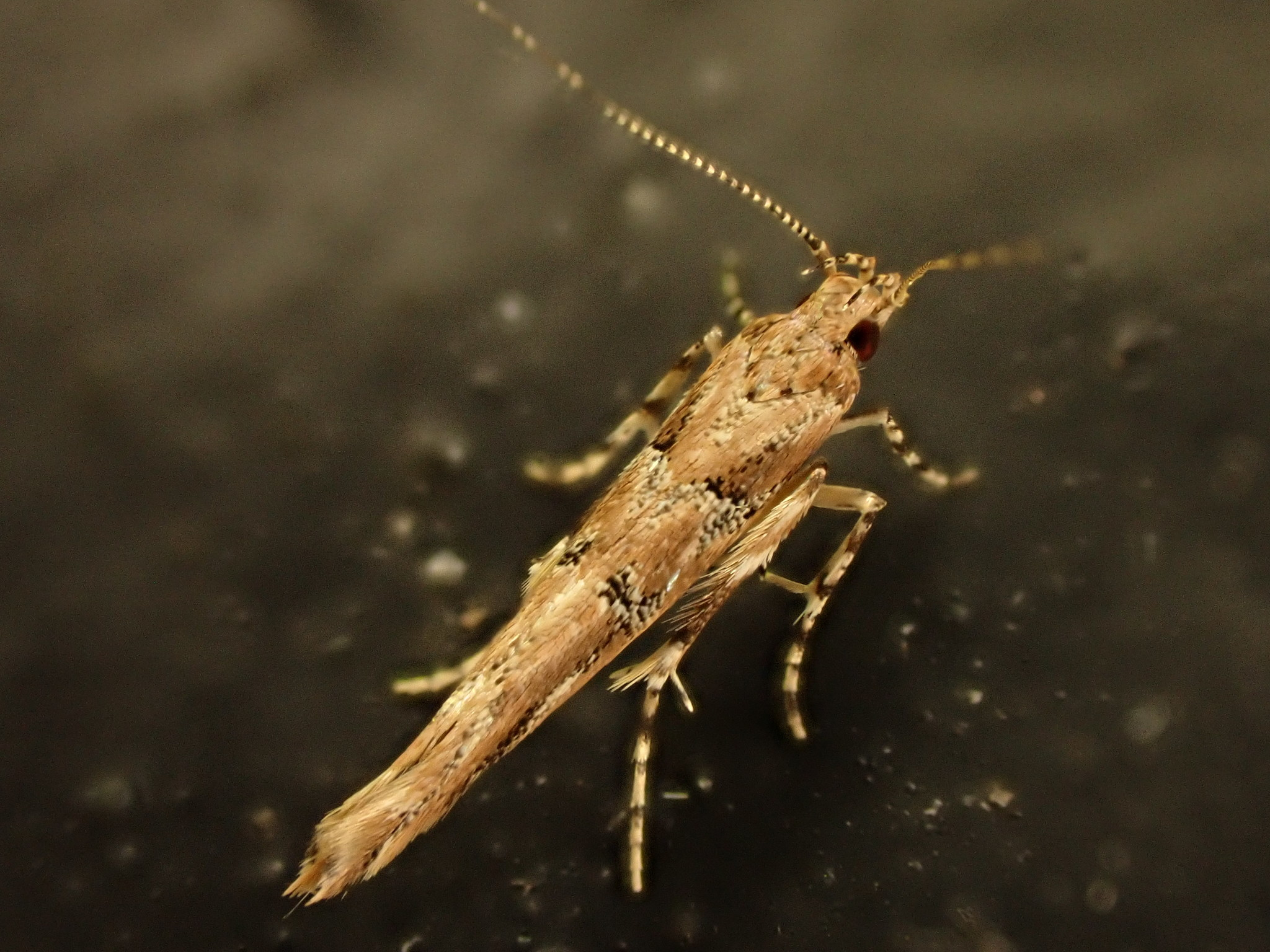

Meyrick described the species as follows:

♂♀. 10-12mm. Head and thorax reddish - ochreous; face ochreous-whitish. Palpi white, second joint with three ochreous rings, terminal joint with three black rings. Antennae white, ringed with black. Abdomen grey, towards base pale-ochreous. Legs whitish, banded with blackish. Forewings elongate, very narrow, long-pointed; vein 5 separate, 6 present; reddish-ochreous, tending to become whitish-ochreous round markings and towards base of inner margin; markings ochreous-white, closely irrorated with black; an irregular oblique fascia from 1/4 of costa, not reaching inner margin, emitting a short streak from posterior edge above middle; an irregular somewhat 8-shaped spot in middle of disc, from upper part of which proceeds an irregular streak to costa before apex; an irregular ochreous-whitish streak along hindmargin from apex to anal angle; a black apical dot : cilia light ochreous-greyish, round apex reddish-ochreous, with a blackish basal line and two blackish apical hooks. Hindwings with veins 6 and 7 stalked; grey; cilia pale-grey, ochreous-tinged.

== Distribution ==
This species is found in New Zealand, including at the Kermadec Islands, in Tasmania, Australia and in Rarotonga in the Cook Islands. Other than its type locality it has also been collecting in Whangārei.

== Hosts ==
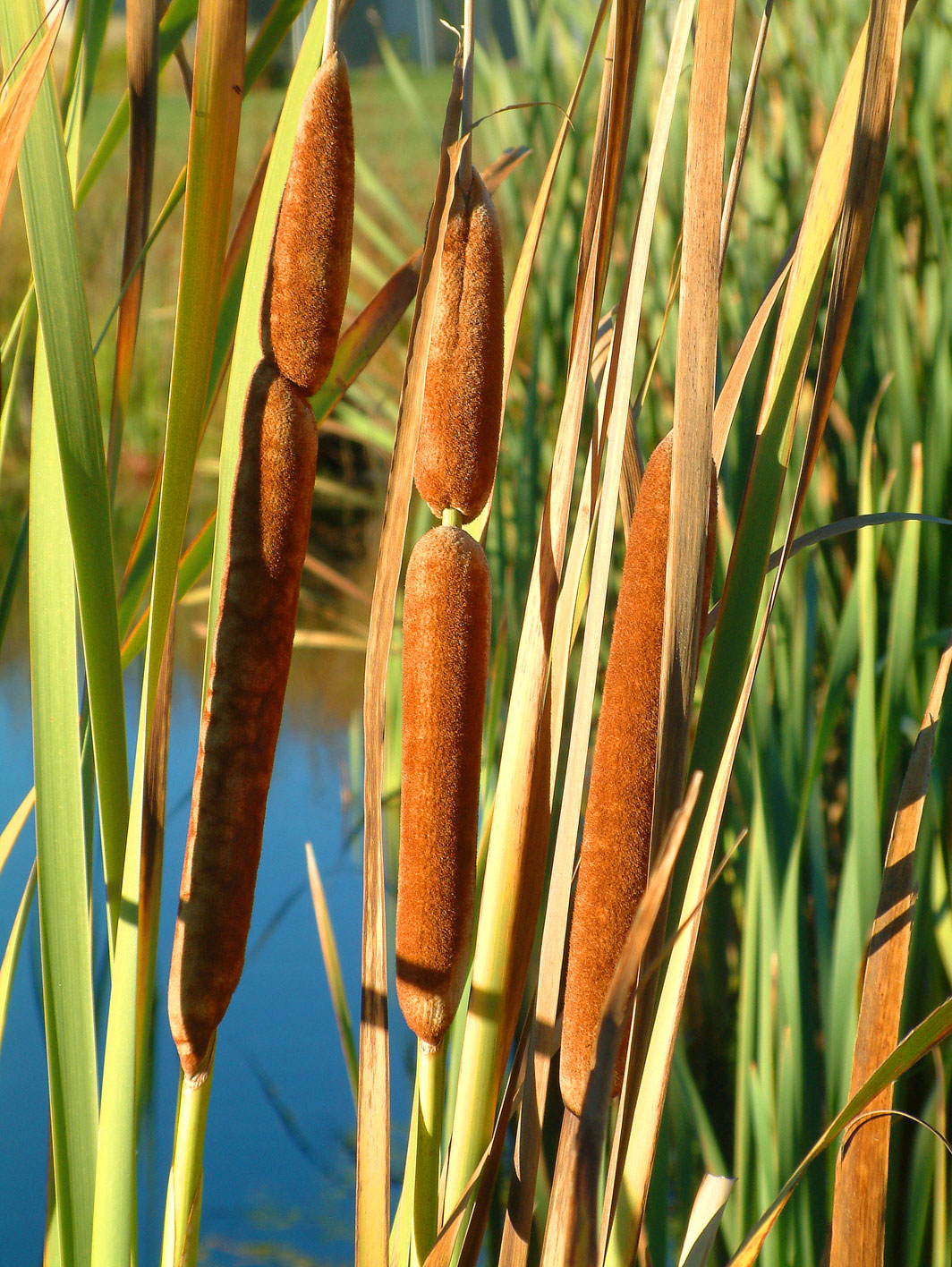
Raupō, a larval host species.

The larvae of this species feed on ripening seed heads of raupō, and stored maize cobs.
