= Pyroderces apicinotella =

Scientific classification
- Domain: Eukaryota
- Kingdom: Animalia
- Phylum: Arthropoda
- Class: Insecta
- Order: Lepidoptera
- Family: Cosmopterigidae
- Genus: Pyroderces
- Species: P. apicinotella

Binomial name
- Pyroderces apicinotella (Chrétien, 1915)

Synonyms
- Lallia apicinotella Chrétien, 1915; Blastodacna cinnamomina Turati, 1930; Tenuipenna simplicella Amsel, 1959

Species of moth

Pyroderces apicinotella is a moth in the family Cosmopterigidae. It is found in Tunisia, Libya and Iraq.

The wingspan is 8–9 mm. Adults have been recorded in May.
