= Pyroderces nephelopyrrha =

Scientific classification
- Kingdom: Animalia
- Phylum: Arthropoda
- Class: Insecta
- Order: Lepidoptera
- Family: Cosmopterigidae
- Genus: Pyroderces
- Species: P. nephelopyrrha

Binomial name
- Pyroderces nephelopyrrha (Meyrick, 1917)

Synonyms
- Anatrachyntis nephelopyrrha Meyrick, 1917

Species of moth

Pyroderces nephelopyrrha is a moth of the family Cosmopterigidae. It is found in Taiwan and India.

The wingspan is about 9 mm.
