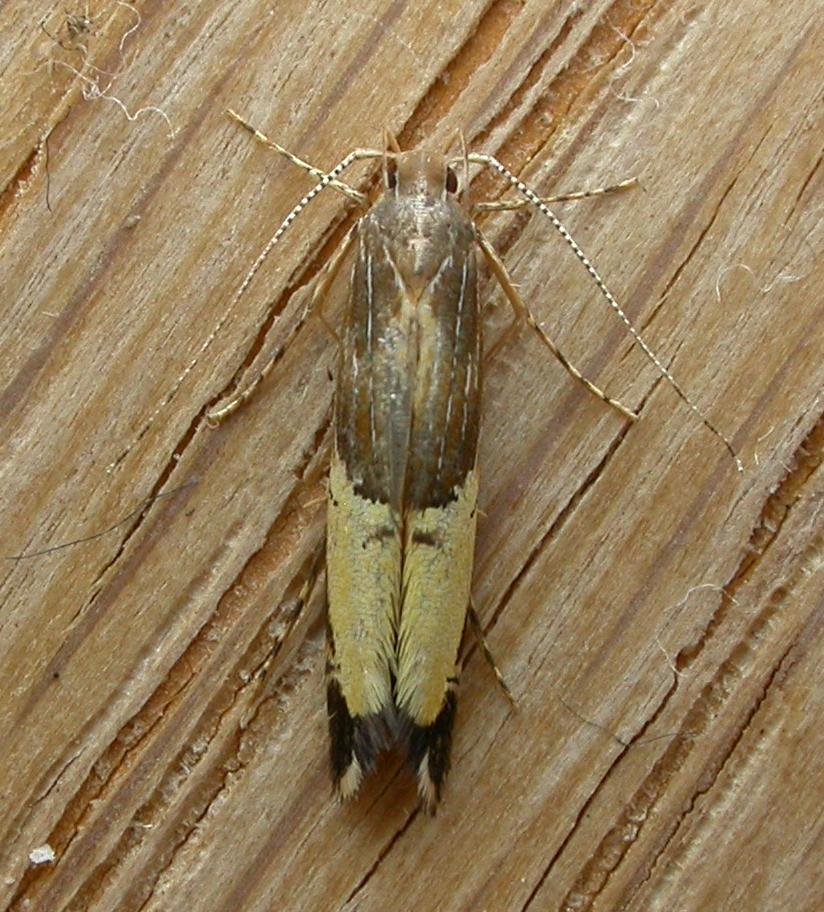

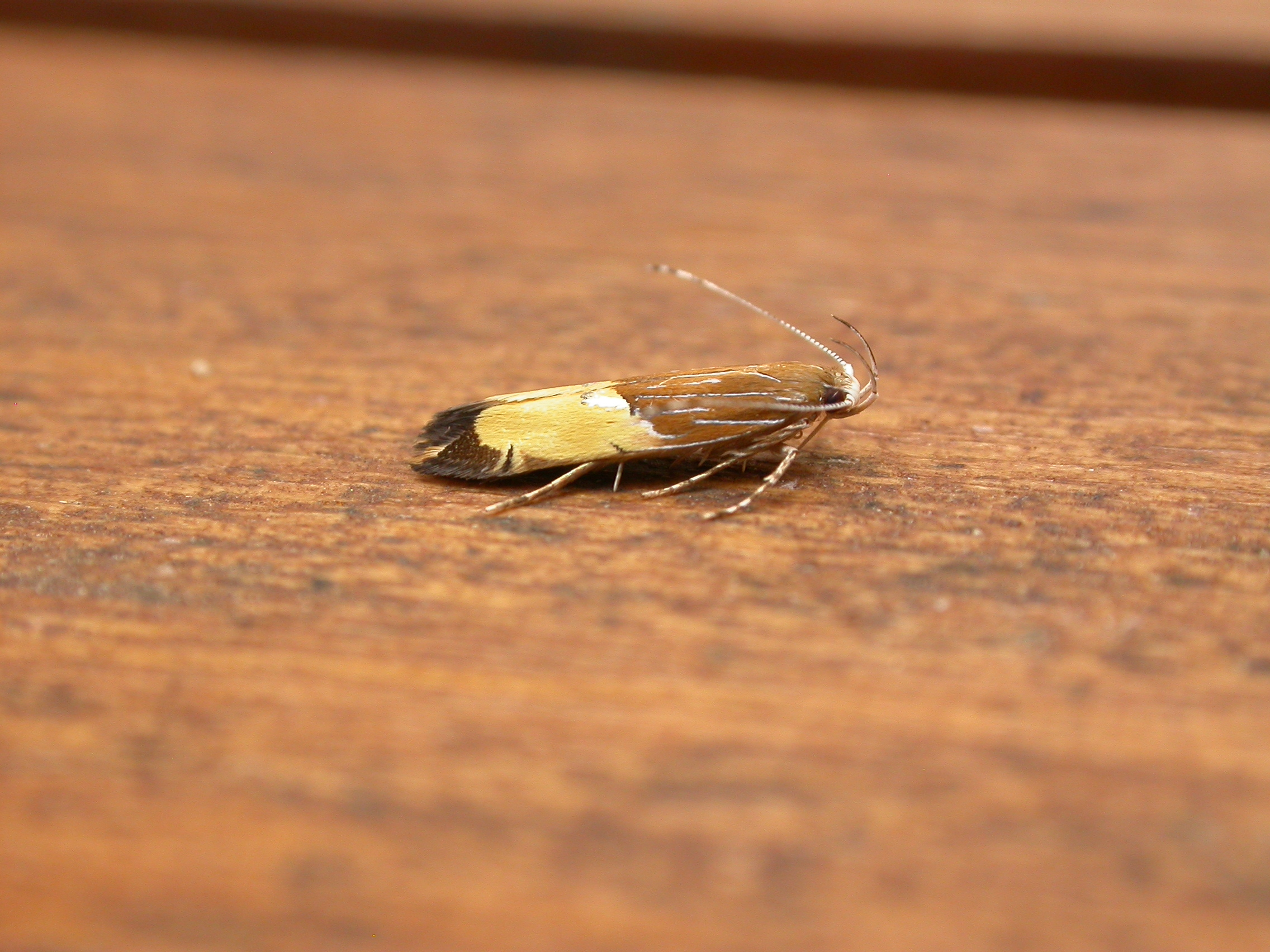

Scientific classification
- Kingdom: Animalia
- Phylum: Arthropoda
- Clade: Pancrustacea
- Class: Insecta
- Order: Lepidoptera
- Family: Cosmopterigidae
- Genus: Labdia
- Species: L. deliciosella

Binomial name
- Labdia deliciosella Walker, 1864

Synonyms
- Glyphipteryx receptella Walker, 1864

= Labdia deliciosella =

Species of moth

Labdia deliciosella is a moth of the family Cosmopterigidae. It is known from Australia, including the Northern Territory, Queensland and New South Wales.

The wingspan is about 20 mm.

The larvae bore into the stems of Acacia perangusta and the galls of Eriosoma lanigerum on Malus pomone.
