= Labdia promacha =

Scientific classification
- Domain: Eukaryota
- Kingdom: Animalia
- Phylum: Arthropoda
- Class: Insecta
- Order: Lepidoptera
- Family: Cosmopterigidae
- Genus: Labdia
- Species: L. promacha

Binomial name
- Labdia promacha (Meyrick, 1897)

Synonyms
- Pyroderces promacha Meyrick, 1897; Stagmatophora promacha

Species of moth

Labdia promacha is a moth of the family Cosmopterigidae. It is found in Taiwan and Australia.
