= Labdia cyanogramma =

Scientific classification
- Domain: Eukaryota
- Kingdom: Animalia
- Phylum: Arthropoda
- Class: Insecta
- Order: Lepidoptera
- Family: Cosmopterigidae
- Genus: Labdia
- Species: L. cyanogramma

Binomial name
- Labdia cyanogramma (Meyrick, 1897)

Synonyms
- Pyroderces cyanogramma Meyrick, 1897; Labdia euphrantica Turner, 1923

Species of moth

Labdia cyanogramma is a moth in the family Cosmopterigidae. It is found in Australia, where it has been recorded from New South Wales and Queensland.
