= Labdia intuens =

Scientific classification
- Domain: Eukaryota
- Kingdom: Animalia
- Phylum: Arthropoda
- Class: Insecta
- Order: Lepidoptera
- Family: Cosmopterigidae
- Genus: Labdia
- Species: L. intuens

Binomial name
- Labdia intuens Meyrick, 1923

Species of moth

Labdia intuens is a moth in the family Cosmopterigidae. It was described by Edward Meyrick in 1923. It is known from Fiji.
