= Labdia macrobela =

Scientific classification
- Kingdom: Animalia
- Phylum: Arthropoda
- Class: Insecta
- Order: Lepidoptera
- Family: Cosmopterigidae
- Genus: Labdia
- Species: L. macrobela

Binomial name
- Labdia macrobela Meyrick, 1918

Species of moth

Labdia macrobela is a moth in the family Cosmopterigidae. It was described by Edward Meyrick in 1918. It is known from Mozambique.
