= Labdia albimaculella =

Scientific classification
- Kingdom: Animalia
- Phylum: Arthropoda
- Class: Insecta
- Order: Lepidoptera
- Family: Cosmopterigidae
- Genus: Labdia
- Species: L. albimaculella

Binomial name
- Labdia albimaculella (van Deventer, 1904)

Synonyms
- Pyroderces albimaculella van Deventer, 1904; Stagmatophora rotalis Meyrick, 1910

Species of moth

Labdia albimaculella is a moth in the family Cosmopterigidae. It is found on Java and Borneo.
