= Labdia auchmerodes =

Scientific classification
- Domain: Eukaryota
- Kingdom: Animalia
- Phylum: Arthropoda
- Class: Insecta
- Order: Lepidoptera
- Family: Cosmopterigidae
- Genus: Labdia
- Species: L. auchmerodes

Binomial name
- Labdia auchmerodes Turner, 1939

Species of moth

Labdia auchmerodes is a moth in the family Cosmopterigidae. It is found in Australia, where it has been recorded from Tasmania.
