= Labdia chalcoplecta =

Scientific classification
- Domain: Eukaryota
- Kingdom: Animalia
- Phylum: Arthropoda
- Class: Insecta
- Order: Lepidoptera
- Family: Cosmopterigidae
- Genus: Labdia
- Species: L. chalcoplecta

Binomial name
- Labdia chalcoplecta Turner, 1933

Species of moth

Labdia chalcoplecta is a moth in the family Cosmopterigidae. It is found in Australia, where it has been recorded from Queensland.
