= Labdia semiramis =

Scientific classification
- Domain: Eukaryota
- Kingdom: Animalia
- Phylum: Arthropoda
- Class: Insecta
- Order: Lepidoptera
- Family: Cosmopterigidae
- Genus: Labdia
- Species: L. semiramis

Binomial name
- Labdia semiramis Meyrick, 1930

Synonyms
- Haemangela semiramis

Species of moth

Labdia semiramis is a moth of the family Cosmopterigidae. It is found on the Solomon Islands.
