= Labdia fasciella =

Scientific classification
- Kingdom: Animalia
- Phylum: Arthropoda
- Clade: Pancrustacea
- Class: Insecta
- Order: Lepidoptera
- Family: Cosmopterigidae
- Genus: Labdia
- Species: L. fasciella

Binomial name
- Labdia fasciella Sinev, 1993

Species of moth

Labdia fasciella is a moth in the family Cosmopterigidae. It was described by Sinev in 1993. It is known from the Russian Far East.
