= Labdia antennella =

Scientific classification
- Kingdom: Animalia
- Phylum: Arthropoda
- Clade: Pancrustacea
- Class: Insecta
- Order: Lepidoptera
- Family: Cosmopterigidae
- Genus: Labdia
- Species: L. antennella

Binomial name
- Labdia antennella Sinev & Park, 1994

Species of moth

Labdia antennella is a moth in the family Cosmopterigidae. It is found in South Korea and Japan.
