= Labdia argyrozona =

Scientific classification
- Domain: Eukaryota
- Kingdom: Animalia
- Phylum: Arthropoda
- Class: Insecta
- Order: Lepidoptera
- Family: Cosmopterigidae
- Genus: Labdia
- Species: L. argyrozona

Binomial name
- Labdia argyrozona (Lower, 1904)

Synonyms
- Pyroderces argyrozona Lower, 1904

Species of moth

Labdia argyrozona is a moth in the family Cosmopterigidae. It is found in Australia, where it has been recorded from Queensland.
