= Labdia chrysophoenicea =

Scientific classification
- Domain: Eukaryota
- Kingdom: Animalia
- Phylum: Arthropoda
- Class: Insecta
- Order: Lepidoptera
- Family: Cosmopterigidae
- Genus: Labdia
- Species: L. chrysophoenicea

Binomial name
- Labdia chrysophoenicea (Meyrick, 1897)

Synonyms
- Stathmopoda chrysophoenicea Meyrick, 1897

Species of moth

Labdia chrysophoenicea is a moth in the family Cosmopterigidae. It is found in Australia, where it has been recorded from Queensland.
