= Labdia pentachrysis =

Scientific classification
- Kingdom: Animalia
- Phylum: Arthropoda
- Class: Insecta
- Order: Lepidoptera
- Family: Cosmopterigidae
- Genus: Labdia
- Species: L. pentachrysis

Binomial name
- Labdia pentachrysis (Meyrick, 1931)

Synonyms
- Limnoecia pentachrysis Meyrick, 1931

Species of moth

Labdia pentachrysis is a moth in the family Cosmopterigidae. It is found on Java.
