= Labdia notochorda =

Scientific classification
- Kingdom: Animalia
- Phylum: Arthropoda
- Class: Insecta
- Order: Lepidoptera
- Family: Cosmopterigidae
- Genus: Labdia
- Species: L. notochorda

Binomial name
- Labdia notochorda (Meyrick, 1907)

Synonyms
- Stagmatophora notochorda Meyrick, 1907

Species of moth

Labdia notochorda is a moth in the family Cosmopterigidae. It was described by Edward Meyrick in 1907. It is found in Sri Lanka.
