= Labdia aphanogramma =

Scientific classification
- Domain: Eukaryota
- Kingdom: Animalia
- Phylum: Arthropoda
- Class: Insecta
- Order: Lepidoptera
- Family: Cosmopterigidae
- Genus: Labdia
- Species: L. aphanogramma

Binomial name
- Labdia aphanogramma Meyrick, 1931

Species of moth

Labdia aphanogramma is a moth in the family Cosmopterigidae. It is found in southern India.
