= Labdia chrysosoma =

Scientific classification
- Domain: Eukaryota
- Kingdom: Animalia
- Phylum: Arthropoda
- Class: Insecta
- Order: Lepidoptera
- Family: Cosmopterigidae
- Genus: Labdia
- Species: L. chrysosoma

Binomial name
- Labdia chrysosoma Meyrick, 1928

Species of moth

Labdia chrysosoma is a moth in the family Cosmopterigidae. It is found in New Ireland.
