= Labdia oxyleuca =

Scientific classification
- Kingdom: Animalia
- Phylum: Arthropoda
- Class: Insecta
- Order: Lepidoptera
- Family: Cosmopterigidae
- Genus: Labdia
- Species: L. oxyleuca

Binomial name
- Labdia oxyleuca (Meyrick, 1915)

Synonyms
- Pyroderces oxyleuca Meyrick, 1915

Species of moth

Labdia oxyleuca is a moth in the family Cosmopterigidae. It is found in Sri Lanka.
