= Labdia acmostacta =

Scientific classification
- Kingdom: Animalia
- Phylum: Arthropoda
- Class: Insecta
- Order: Lepidoptera
- Family: Cosmopterigidae
- Genus: Labdia
- Species: L. acmostacta

Binomial name
- Labdia acmostacta Meyrick, 1932

Species of moth

Labdia acmostacta is a moth in the family Cosmopterigidae. It is found on Java.
