= Labdia selenopsis =

Scientific classification
- Domain: Eukaryota
- Kingdom: Animalia
- Phylum: Arthropoda
- Class: Insecta
- Order: Lepidoptera
- Family: Cosmopterigidae
- Genus: Labdia
- Species: L. selenopsis

Binomial name
- Labdia selenopsis (Meyrick, 1905)

Synonyms
- Pyroderces selenopsis Meyrick, 1905

Species of moth

Labdia selenopsis is a moth in the family Cosmopterigidae. It is found in Sri Lanka.
