= Labdia terenopa =

Scientific classification
- Domain: Eukaryota
- Kingdom: Animalia
- Phylum: Arthropoda
- Class: Insecta
- Order: Lepidoptera
- Family: Cosmopterigidae
- Genus: Labdia
- Species: L. terenopa

Binomial name
- Labdia terenopa (Meyrick, 1917)

Synonyms
- Pyroderces terenopa Meyrick, 1917

Species of moth

Labdia terenopa is a moth in the family Cosmopterigidae. It is found in Sri Lanka.
