= Labdia ceriocosma =

Scientific classification
- Domain: Eukaryota
- Kingdom: Animalia
- Phylum: Arthropoda
- Class: Insecta
- Order: Lepidoptera
- Family: Cosmopterigidae
- Genus: Labdia
- Species: L. ceriocosma

Binomial name
- Labdia ceriocosma Meyrick, 1934

Synonyms
- Cosmopterix ceriocosma

Species of moth

Labdia ceriocosma is a moth in the family Cosmopterigidae. It was described by Edward Meyrick in 1934. It is found on the Marquesas Islands in French Polynesia.
