= Labdia leucatella =

Scientific classification
- Kingdom: Animalia
- Phylum: Arthropoda
- Class: Insecta
- Order: Lepidoptera
- Family: Cosmopterigidae
- Genus: Labdia
- Species: L. leucatella

Binomial name
- Labdia leucatella (Snellen, 1901)

Synonyms
- Pyroderces leucatella Snellen, 1901

Species of moth

Labdia leucatella is a moth in the family Cosmopterigidae. It was described by Snellen in 1901. It is known from Java.
