= Labdia hastifera =

Scientific classification
- Domain: Eukaryota
- Kingdom: Animalia
- Phylum: Arthropoda
- Class: Insecta
- Order: Lepidoptera
- Family: Cosmopterigidae
- Genus: Labdia
- Species: L. hastifera

Binomial name
- Labdia hastifera Meyrick, 1920

Species of moth

Labdia hastifera is a moth in the family Cosmopterigidae. It was described by Edward Meyrick in 1920. It is known from Fiji.
