= Labdia cremasta =

Scientific classification
- Domain: Eukaryota
- Kingdom: Animalia
- Phylum: Arthropoda
- Class: Insecta
- Order: Lepidoptera
- Family: Cosmopterigidae
- Genus: Labdia
- Species: L. cremasta

Binomial name
- Labdia cremasta (Meyrick, 1915)

Synonyms
- Pyroderces cremasta Meyrick, 1915

Species of moth

Labdia cremasta is a moth in the family Cosmopterigidae. It is found in India.
