= Labdia sphenoclina =

Scientific classification
- Domain: Eukaryota
- Kingdom: Animalia
- Phylum: Arthropoda
- Class: Insecta
- Order: Lepidoptera
- Family: Cosmopterigidae
- Genus: Labdia
- Species: L. sphenoclina

Binomial name
- Labdia sphenoclina Meyrick, 1922

Species of moth

Labdia sphenoclina is a moth in the family Cosmopterigidae. It is found in India.
