= Labdia arachnitis =

Scientific classification
- Kingdom: Animalia
- Phylum: Arthropoda
- Class: Insecta
- Order: Lepidoptera
- Family: Cosmopterigidae
- Genus: Labdia
- Species: L. arachnitis

Binomial name
- Labdia arachnitis (Meyrick, 1907)

Synonyms
- Stagmatophora arachnitis Meyrick, 1907

Species of moth

Labdia arachnitis is a moth in the family Cosmopterigidae. It is found in Sri Lanka.
