= Labdia iolampra =

Scientific classification
- Domain: Eukaryota
- Kingdom: Animalia
- Phylum: Arthropoda
- Class: Insecta
- Order: Lepidoptera
- Family: Cosmopterigidae
- Genus: Labdia
- Species: L. iolampra

Binomial name
- Labdia iolampra Meyrick, 1938

Species of moth

Labdia iolampra is a moth in the family Cosmopterigidae. It was described by Edward Meyrick in 1938. It is known from Yunnan, China.
