= Labdia halticopa =

Scientific classification
- Domain: Eukaryota
- Kingdom: Animalia
- Phylum: Arthropoda
- Class: Insecta
- Order: Lepidoptera
- Family: Cosmopterigidae
- Genus: Labdia
- Species: L. halticopa

Binomial name
- Labdia halticopa Meyrick, 1927

Species of moth

Labdia halticopa is a moth in the family Cosmopterigidae. It was described by Edward Meyrick in 1927. It is known from Samoa.
