= Labdia bitabulata =

Scientific classification
- Kingdom: Animalia
- Phylum: Arthropoda
- Class: Insecta
- Order: Lepidoptera
- Family: Cosmopterigidae
- Genus: Labdia
- Species: L. bitabulata

Binomial name
- Labdia bitabulata Meyrick, 1935

Species of moth

Labdia bitabulata is a moth of the family Cosmopterigidae. It is found in Taiwan.
