= Labdia nutrix =

Scientific classification
- Domain: Eukaryota
- Kingdom: Animalia
- Phylum: Arthropoda
- Class: Insecta
- Order: Lepidoptera
- Family: Cosmopterigidae
- Genus: Labdia
- Species: L. nutrix

Binomial name
- Labdia nutrix Meyrick, 1928

Species of moth

Labdia nutrix is a moth in the family Cosmopterigidae. It was described by Edward Meyrick in 1928. It is found in India.
