= Labdia issikii =

Scientific classification
- Kingdom: Animalia
- Phylum: Arthropoda
- Class: Insecta
- Order: Lepidoptera
- Family: Cosmopterigidae
- Genus: Labdia
- Species: L. issikii

Binomial name
- Labdia issikii Kuroko, 1892

Species of moth

Labdia issikii is a moth in the family Cosmopterigidae. It was described by Kuroko in 1892. It is known from Japan.
