= Labdia picrochalca =

Scientific classification
- Domain: Eukaryota
- Kingdom: Animalia
- Phylum: Arthropoda
- Class: Insecta
- Order: Lepidoptera
- Family: Cosmopterigidae
- Genus: Labdia
- Species: L. picrochalca

Binomial name
- Labdia picrochalca Meyrick, 1937

Species of moth

Labdia picrochalca is a moth in the family Cosmopterigidae. It is found in India.
