= Labdia faceta =

Scientific classification
- Domain: Eukaryota
- Kingdom: Animalia
- Phylum: Arthropoda
- Class: Insecta
- Order: Lepidoptera
- Family: Cosmopterigidae
- Genus: Labdia
- Species: L. faceta

Binomial name
- Labdia faceta (Meyrick, 1912)

Synonyms
- Stagmatophora faceta Meyrick, 1912

Species of moth

Labdia faceta is a moth in the family Cosmopterigidae. It was described by Edward Meyrick in 1912. It is known from India and Sri Lanka.
