= Labdia isomerista =

Scientific classification
- Domain: Eukaryota
- Kingdom: Animalia
- Phylum: Arthropoda
- Class: Insecta
- Order: Lepidoptera
- Family: Cosmopterigidae
- Genus: Labdia
- Species: L. isomerista

Binomial name
- Labdia isomerista Bradley, 1961

Species of moth

Labdia isomerista is a moth in the family Cosmopterigidae. It was described by John David Bradley in 1961. It is known from Guadalcanal in the Solomon Islands.
