= Labdia bicolorella =

Scientific classification
- Kingdom: Animalia
- Phylum: Arthropoda
- Class: Insecta
- Order: Lepidoptera
- Family: Cosmopterigidae
- Genus: Labdia
- Species: L. bicolorella

Binomial name
- Labdia bicolorella (Snellen, 1901)

Synonyms
- Pyroderces bicolorella Snellen, 1901

Species of moth

Labdia bicolorella is a moth in the family Cosmopterigidae. It is found on Java.
