= Labdia xylinaula =

Scientific classification
- Domain: Eukaryota
- Kingdom: Animalia
- Phylum: Arthropoda
- Class: Insecta
- Order: Lepidoptera
- Family: Cosmopterigidae
- Genus: Labdia
- Species: L. xylinaula

Binomial name
- Labdia xylinaula Meyrick, 1935

Species of moth

Labdia xylinaula is a moth in the family Cosmopterigidae. It is found in India.
