= Labdia caulota =

Scientific classification
- Domain: Eukaryota
- Kingdom: Animalia
- Phylum: Arthropoda
- Class: Insecta
- Order: Lepidoptera
- Family: Cosmopterigidae
- Genus: Labdia
- Species: L. caulota

Binomial name
- Labdia caulota Meyrick, 1918

Species of moth

Labdia caulota is a moth in the family Cosmopterigidae. It is found in South Africa.
