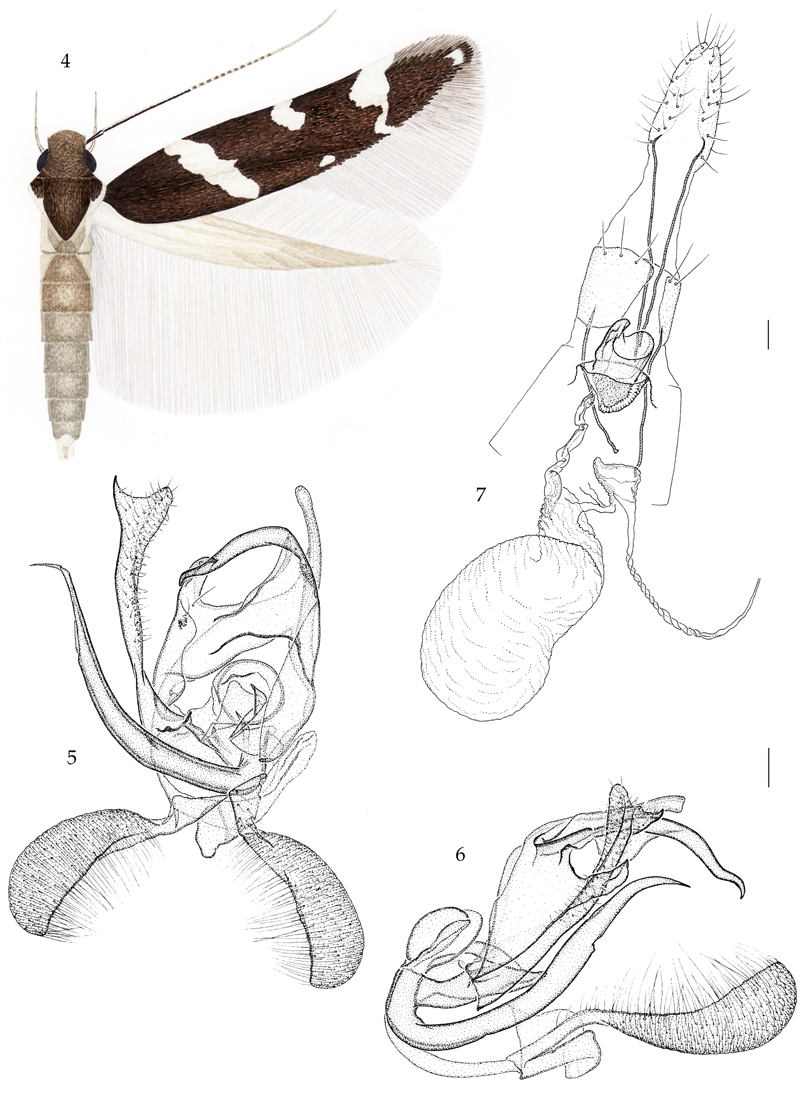
- 4. Labdia caroli adult; 5. male genitalia, ventrally; 6. male genitalia, laterally; 7. female genitalia

Scientific classification
- Kingdom: Animalia
- Phylum: Arthropoda
- Clade: Pancrustacea
- Class: Insecta
- Order: Lepidoptera
- Family: Cosmopterigidae
- Genus: Labdia
- Species: L. caroli

Binomial name
- Labdia caroli J.C. Koster, 2008

= Labdia caroli =

Species of moth

Labdia caroli is a moth of the family Cosmopterigidae. It is endemic to the Dachigam National Park in Jammu and Kashmir, India.

The length of the forewings is ca. 4 mm.
