= Labdia ochrotypa =

Scientific classification
- Domain: Eukaryota
- Kingdom: Animalia
- Phylum: Arthropoda
- Class: Insecta
- Order: Lepidoptera
- Family: Cosmopterigidae
- Genus: Labdia
- Species: L. ochrotypa

Binomial name
- Labdia ochrotypa Bradley, 1961

Species of moth

Labdia ochrotypa is a moth in the family Cosmopterigidae. It was described by John David Bradley in 1961. It is found on Rennell Island and Bellona Island in the Solomon Islands.
