= Labdia molybdaula =

Scientific classification
- Domain: Eukaryota
- Kingdom: Animalia
- Phylum: Arthropoda
- Class: Insecta
- Order: Lepidoptera
- Family: Cosmopterigidae
- Genus: Labdia
- Species: L. molybdaula

Binomial name
- Labdia molybdaula (Meyrick, 1915)

Synonyms
- Pyroderces molybdaula Meyrick, 1915

Species of moth

Labdia molybdaula is a moth in the family Cosmopterigidae. It was described by Edward Meyrick in 1915. It is known from India.
