= Labdia fletcherella =

Scientific classification
- Domain: Eukaryota
- Kingdom: Animalia
- Phylum: Arthropoda
- Class: Insecta
- Order: Lepidoptera
- Family: Cosmopterigidae
- Genus: Labdia
- Species: L. fletcherella

Binomial name
- Labdia fletcherella Bradley, 1951

Species of moth

Labdia fletcherella is a moth in the family Cosmopterigidae. It was described by John David Bradley in 1951. It is known from India.
