= Labdia embrochota =

Scientific classification
- Domain: Eukaryota
- Kingdom: Animalia
- Phylum: Arthropoda
- Class: Insecta
- Order: Lepidoptera
- Family: Cosmopterigidae
- Genus: Labdia
- Species: L. embrochota

Binomial name
- Labdia embrochota (Meyrick, 1914)

Synonyms
- Pyroderces embrochota Meyrick, 1914

Species of moth

Labdia embrochota is a moth in the family Cosmopterigidae. It was described by Edward Meyrick in 1914. It is known from Malawi.
