= Labdia clopaea =

Scientific classification
- Kingdom: Animalia
- Phylum: Arthropoda
- Class: Insecta
- Order: Lepidoptera
- Family: Cosmopterigidae
- Genus: Labdia
- Species: L. clopaea

Binomial name
- Labdia clopaea (Meyrick, 1917)

Synonyms
- Pyroderces clopaea Meyrick, 1917

Species of moth

Labdia clopaea is a moth in the family Cosmopterigidae. It is found in Sri Lanka.
