= Labdia diophanes =

Scientific classification
- Domain: Eukaryota
- Kingdom: Animalia
- Phylum: Arthropoda
- Class: Insecta
- Order: Lepidoptera
- Family: Cosmopterigidae
- Genus: Labdia
- Species: L. diophanes

Binomial name
- Labdia diophanes Meyrick, 1927

Species of moth

Labdia diophanes is a moth in the family Cosmopterigidae. It is found in Zimbabwe.
