= Labdia redimita =

Scientific classification
- Kingdom: Animalia
- Phylum: Arthropoda
- Class: Insecta
- Order: Lepidoptera
- Family: Cosmopterigidae
- Genus: Labdia
- Species: L. redimita

Binomial name
- Labdia redimita (Meyrick, 1917)

Synonyms
- Pyroderces redimita Meyrick, 1917

Species of moth

Labdia redimita is a moth in the family Cosmopterigidae. It is found in India.
