= Labdia chionopsamma =

Scientific classification
- Domain: Eukaryota
- Kingdom: Animalia
- Phylum: Arthropoda
- Class: Insecta
- Order: Lepidoptera
- Family: Cosmopterigidae
- Genus: Labdia
- Species: L. chionopsamma

Binomial name
- Labdia chionopsamma (Meyrick, 1886)

Synonyms
- Proterocosma chionopsamma Meyrick, 1886

Species of moth

Labdia chionopsamma is a moth in the family Cosmopterigidae. It was described by Edward Meyrick in 1886. It is found on New Guinea.
