= Labdia albilineella =

Scientific classification
- Kingdom: Animalia
- Phylum: Arthropoda
- Class: Insecta
- Order: Lepidoptera
- Family: Cosmopterigidae
- Genus: Labdia
- Species: L. albilineella

Binomial name
- Labdia albilineella (van Deventer, 1904)

Synonyms
- Pyroderces albilineella van Deventer, 1904

Species of moth

Labdia albilineella is a moth in the family Cosmopterigidae. It is found on Java.
