= Labdia orthritis =

Scientific classification
- Domain: Eukaryota
- Kingdom: Animalia
- Phylum: Arthropoda
- Class: Insecta
- Order: Lepidoptera
- Family: Cosmopterigidae
- Genus: Labdia
- Species: L. orthritis

Binomial name
- Labdia orthritis Meyrick, 1930

Species of moth

Labdia orthritis is a moth in the family Cosmopterigidae. It was described by Edward Meyrick in 1930. It is found on Fiji.
