= Labdia nesophora =

Scientific classification
- Kingdom: Animalia
- Phylum: Arthropoda
- Class: Insecta
- Order: Lepidoptera
- Family: Cosmopterigidae
- Genus: Labdia
- Species: L. nesophora

Binomial name
- Labdia nesophora (Meyrick, 1897)

Synonyms
- Pyroderces nesophora Meyrick, 1897

Species of moth

Labdia nesophora is a moth in the family Cosmopterigidae. It was described by Edward Meyrick in 1897. It is found in Australia, where it has been recorded from South Australia.
