= Labdia allotriopa =

Scientific classification
- Kingdom: Animalia
- Phylum: Arthropoda
- Clade: Pancrustacea
- Class: Insecta
- Order: Lepidoptera
- Family: Cosmopterigidae
- Genus: Labdia
- Species: L. allotriopa

Binomial name
- Labdia allotriopa Meyrick, 1923

Species of moth

Labdia allotriopa is a moth in the family Cosmopterigidae. It is found on Fiji.
