= Labdia irimetalla =

Scientific classification
- Kingdom: Animalia
- Phylum: Arthropoda
- Class: Insecta
- Order: Lepidoptera
- Family: Cosmopterigidae
- Genus: Labdia
- Species: L. irimetalla

Binomial name
- Labdia irimetalla Meyrick, 1933

Species of moth

Labdia irimetalla is a moth in the family Cosmopterigidae. It was described by Edward Meyrick in 1933. It is known from the Democratic Republic of the Congo.
