= Labdia amphipterna =

Scientific classification
- Domain: Eukaryota
- Kingdom: Animalia
- Phylum: Arthropoda
- Class: Insecta
- Order: Lepidoptera
- Family: Cosmopterigidae
- Genus: Labdia
- Species: L. amphipterna

Binomial name
- Labdia amphipterna (Meyrick, 1917)

Synonyms
- Pyroderces amphipterna Meyrick, 1917

Species of moth

Labdia amphipterna is a moth in the family Cosmopterigidae. It is found in India (Coorg).
