= Labdia autotoma =

Scientific classification
- Domain: Eukaryota
- Kingdom: Animalia
- Phylum: Arthropoda
- Class: Insecta
- Order: Lepidoptera
- Family: Cosmopterigidae
- Genus: Labdia
- Species: L. autotoma

Binomial name
- Labdia autotoma (Meyrick, 1919)

Synonyms
- Stagmatophora autotoma Meyrick, 1919

Species of moth

Labdia autotoma is a moth in the family Cosmopterigidae. It is found in Australia, where it has been recorded from New South Wales.
