= Labdia cyanodora =

Scientific classification
- Domain: Eukaryota
- Kingdom: Animalia
- Phylum: Arthropoda
- Class: Insecta
- Order: Lepidoptera
- Family: Cosmopterigidae
- Genus: Labdia
- Species: L. cyanodora

Binomial name
- Labdia cyanodora Meyrick, 1935

Species of moth

Labdia cyanodora is a moth in the family Cosmopterigidae. It is found in India.
