= Labdia saliens =

Scientific classification
- Kingdom: Animalia
- Phylum: Arthropoda
- Clade: Pancrustacea
- Class: Insecta
- Order: Lepidoptera
- Family: Cosmopterigidae
- Genus: Labdia
- Species: L. saliens

Binomial name
- Labdia saliens Meyrick, 1928

Species of moth

Labdia saliens is a moth in the family Cosmopterigidae. It is endemic to the New Hebrides / Vanuatu.
