= Labdia citracma =

Scientific classification
- Domain: Eukaryota
- Kingdom: Animalia
- Phylum: Arthropoda
- Class: Insecta
- Order: Lepidoptera
- Family: Cosmopterigidae
- Genus: Labdia
- Species: L. citracma

Binomial name
- Labdia citracma (Meyrick, 1915)

Synonyms
- Pyroderces citracma Meyrick, 1915; Labdia citrama

Species of moth

Labdia citracma is a moth of the family Cosmopterigidae. It is found in Taiwan, Japan, India and China. It has also been recorded from the Democratic Republic of Congo.

The wingspan is 10–15 mm.

The larvae feed on Theobroma cacao.
