= Labdia incompta =

Scientific classification
- Domain: Eukaryota
- Kingdom: Animalia
- Phylum: Arthropoda
- Class: Insecta
- Order: Lepidoptera
- Family: Cosmopterigidae
- Genus: Labdia
- Species: L. incompta

Binomial name
- Labdia incompta (Meyrick, 1917)

Synonyms
- Pyroderces incompta Meyrick, 1917

Species of moth

Labdia incompta is a moth in the family Cosmopterigidae. It was described by Edward Meyrick in 1917. It is known from India.
