= Labdia stibogramma =

Scientific classification
- Domain: Eukaryota
- Kingdom: Animalia
- Phylum: Arthropoda
- Class: Insecta
- Order: Lepidoptera
- Family: Cosmopterigidae
- Genus: Labdia
- Species: L. stibogramma

Binomial name
- Labdia stibogramma Meyrick, 1924

Species of moth

Labdia stibogramma is a moth in the family Cosmopterigidae. It is found in Malaysia.
