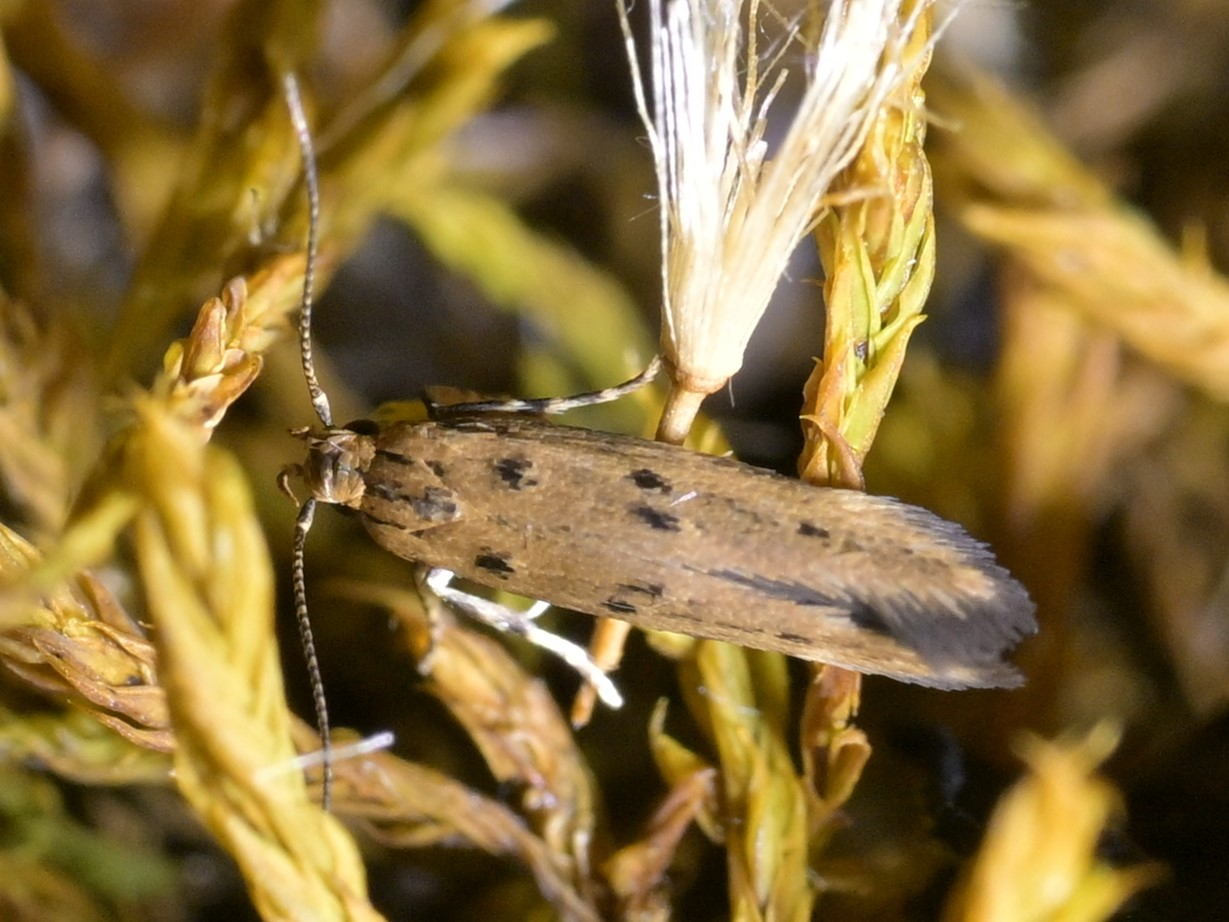

Scientific classification
- Domain: Eukaryota
- Kingdom: Animalia
- Phylum: Arthropoda
- Class: Insecta
- Order: Lepidoptera
- Family: Cosmopterigidae
- Genus: Labdia
- Species: L. anarithma

Binomial name
- Labdia anarithma (Meyrick, 1889)

Synonyms
- Proterocosma anarithma Meyrick, 1889; Pyroderces anarithma (Meyrick, 1889)

= Labdia anarithma =

Species of moth

Labdia anarithma is a moth of the family Cosmopterigidae. It was described by Edward Meyrick in 1888. It is found in New Zealand and throughout Australia. Adults are on the wing from December to March and are day flying. They have been collected by sweeping bracken fern.

== Taxonomy ==
This species was first described by Edward Meyrick in 1889 and named Proterocosma anarithma. In 1897 Meyrick placed this species within the genus Pyroderces. This species was then placed in the genus Labdia in 1927 by A. Jefferis Turner. This placement was confirmed in 1996 in the Checklist of Australian Lepidoptera. The lectotype specimen, collected in New Plymouth by Meyrick, is held at the Natural History Museum, London.

== Description ==
Meyrick first described this species as follows:

♂♀. 7-10 mm. Head and thorax brownish-ochreous, face ochreous-whitish. Palpi ochreous-whitish, second joint with basal half and a subapical ring suffusedly irrorated with black, terminal joint irrorated with dark fuscous. Antennae whitish-ochreous, ringed with dark fuscous. Abdomen grey-whitish, or grey. Legs dark grey, suffusedly ringed with whitish. Forewings lanceolate; vein 5 separate, 6 present; brownish-ochreous, sometimes more or less sprinkled with dark fuscous; a black dot on base of costa, sometimes obsolete, a second on costa near base, a third in disc beneath second, a fourth on base of inner margin, often obsolete, a fifth in disc before middle, a sixth on fold rather obliquely beyond fifth, and a seventh in disc at 2/3; generally two small indistinct whitish-ochreous spots on costa and inner margin opposite seventh dot : cilia light grey, darker round apex. Hindwings with veins 6 and 7 from a point; grey; cilia light-grey.

== Distribution ==
This species is native to both New Zealand and Australia. In New Zealand this species has been observed in Taranaki, Napier. Palmerston North, Masterton, Wanganui and Wellington.

== Behaviour ==
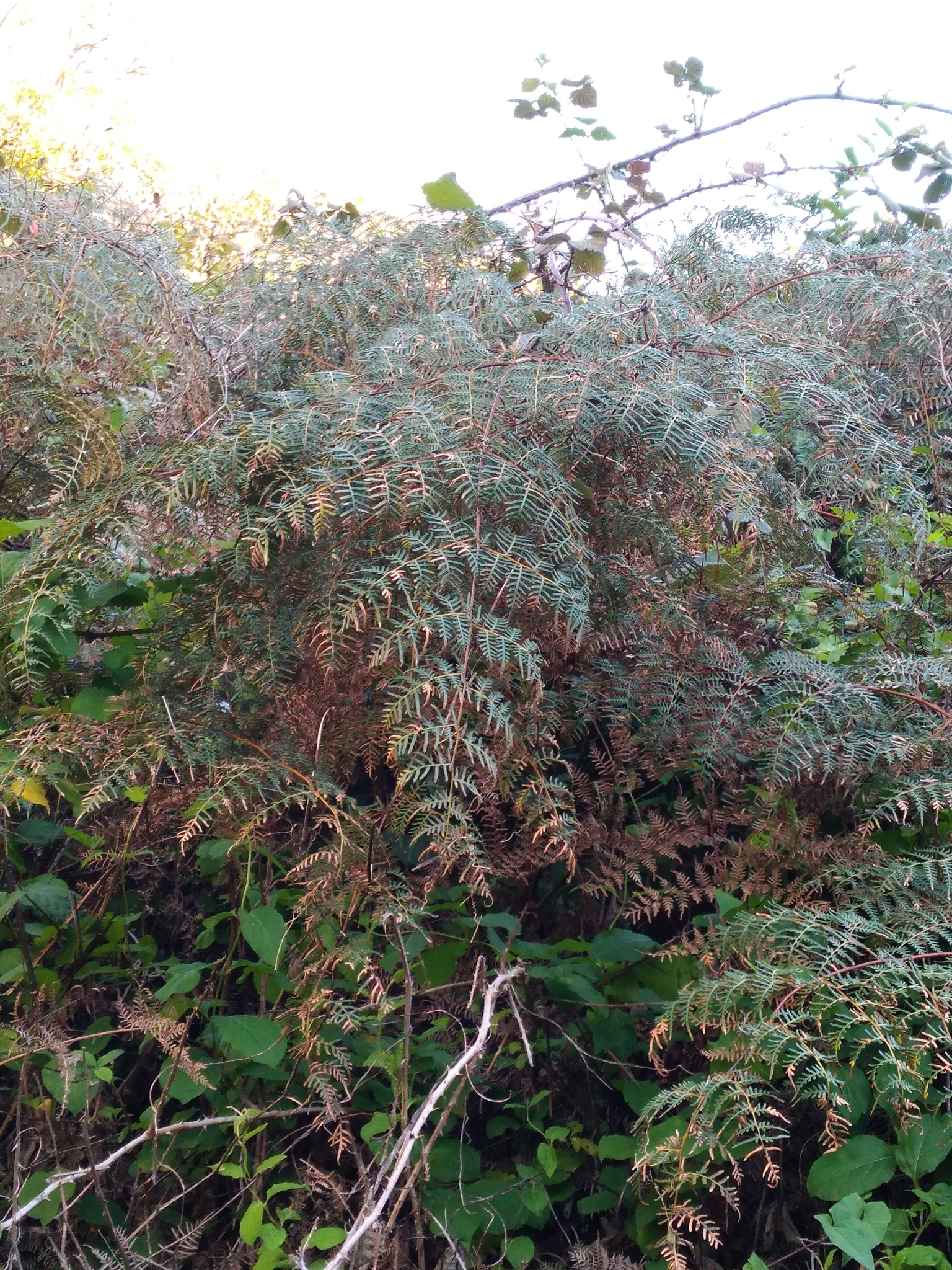
Bracken fern Pteridium esculentum.

The adults of this species are on the wing from December until March and are day flying. George Hudson stated he had collected them by sweeping bracken fern in the late afternoon.
