= Labdia niphosticta =

Scientific classification
- Domain: Eukaryota
- Kingdom: Animalia
- Phylum: Arthropoda
- Class: Insecta
- Order: Lepidoptera
- Family: Cosmopterigidae
- Genus: Labdia
- Species: L. niphosticta

Binomial name
- Labdia niphosticta (Meyrick, 1936)

Synonyms
- Stagmatophora niphosticta Meyrick, 1936

Species of moth

Labdia niphosticta is a moth in the family Cosmopterigidae. It was described by Edward Meyrick in 1936. It is found in Japan.
