= Labdia argyrostrepta =

Scientific classification
- Domain: Eukaryota
- Kingdom: Animalia
- Phylum: Arthropoda
- Class: Insecta
- Order: Lepidoptera
- Family: Cosmopterigidae
- Genus: Labdia
- Species: L. argyrostrepta

Binomial name
- Labdia argyrostrepta (Meyrick, 1897)

Synonyms
- Pyroderces argyrostrepta Meyrick, 1897; Stagmatophora argyrostrepta Meyrick, 1897

Species of moth

Labdia argyrostrepta is a moth in the family Cosmopterigidae. It is found in Australia, where it has been recorded from New South Wales.
