= Labdia deianira =

Scientific classification
- Domain: Eukaryota
- Kingdom: Animalia
- Phylum: Arthropoda
- Class: Insecta
- Order: Lepidoptera
- Family: Cosmopterigidae
- Genus: Labdia
- Species: L. deianira

Binomial name
- Labdia deianira Meyrick, 1927

Species of moth

Labdia deianira is a moth in the family Cosmopterigidae. It is found on Samoa.
