= Labdia chryselectra =

Scientific classification
- Domain: Eukaryota
- Kingdom: Animalia
- Phylum: Arthropoda
- Class: Insecta
- Order: Lepidoptera
- Family: Cosmopterigidae
- Genus: Labdia
- Species: L. chryselectra

Binomial name
- Labdia chryselectra (Meyrick, 1897)

Synonyms
- Pyroderces chryselectra Meyrick, 1897

Species of moth

Labdia chryselectra is a moth in the family Cosmopterigidae. It is found in Australia, where it has been reported from Queensland.
