= Labdia ischnotypa =

Scientific classification
- Domain: Eukaryota
- Kingdom: Animalia
- Phylum: Arthropoda
- Class: Insecta
- Order: Lepidoptera
- Family: Cosmopterigidae
- Genus: Labdia
- Species: L. ischnotypa

Binomial name
- Labdia ischnotypa Turner, 1923

Species of moth

Labdia ischnotypa is a moth in the family Cosmopterigidae. It was described by Alfred Jefferis Turner in 1923. It is found in Australia, where it was recorded in Queensland.

== Description ==
The moth is described as measuring 8mm. The head is a white-grey colour. The body consists of a dark thorax, grey abdomen with narrow forewings. The palpi, antennae and legs are white.
