= Labdia oxycharis =

Scientific classification
- Domain: Eukaryota
- Kingdom: Animalia
- Phylum: Arthropoda
- Class: Insecta
- Order: Lepidoptera
- Family: Cosmopterigidae
- Genus: Labdia
- Species: L. oxycharis

Binomial name
- Labdia oxycharis Meyrick, 1921

Species of moth

Labdia oxycharis is a moth in the family Cosmopterigidae. It was described by Edward Meyrick in 1921. It is mostly found on Java in Indonesia.
