= Labdia oxytoma =

Scientific classification
- Kingdom: Animalia
- Phylum: Arthropoda
- Class: Insecta
- Order: Lepidoptera
- Family: Cosmopterigidae
- Genus: Labdia
- Species: L. oxytoma

Binomial name
- Labdia oxytoma (Meyrick, 1897)

Synonyms
- Pyroderces oxytoma Meyrick, 1897; Stagmatophora oxytoma

Species of moth

Labdia oxytoma is a moth in the family Cosmopterigidae. It is found in Australia, where it has been recorded from New South Wales.
