= Labdia dicyanitis =

Scientific classification
- Domain: Eukaryota
- Kingdom: Animalia
- Phylum: Arthropoda
- Class: Insecta
- Order: Lepidoptera
- Family: Cosmopterigidae
- Genus: Labdia
- Species: L. dicyanitis

Binomial name
- Labdia dicyanitis Meyrick, 1934

Species of moth

Labdia dicyanitis is a moth in the family Cosmopterigidae. It was described by Edward Meyrick in 1934. It is known from Rapa Iti.
