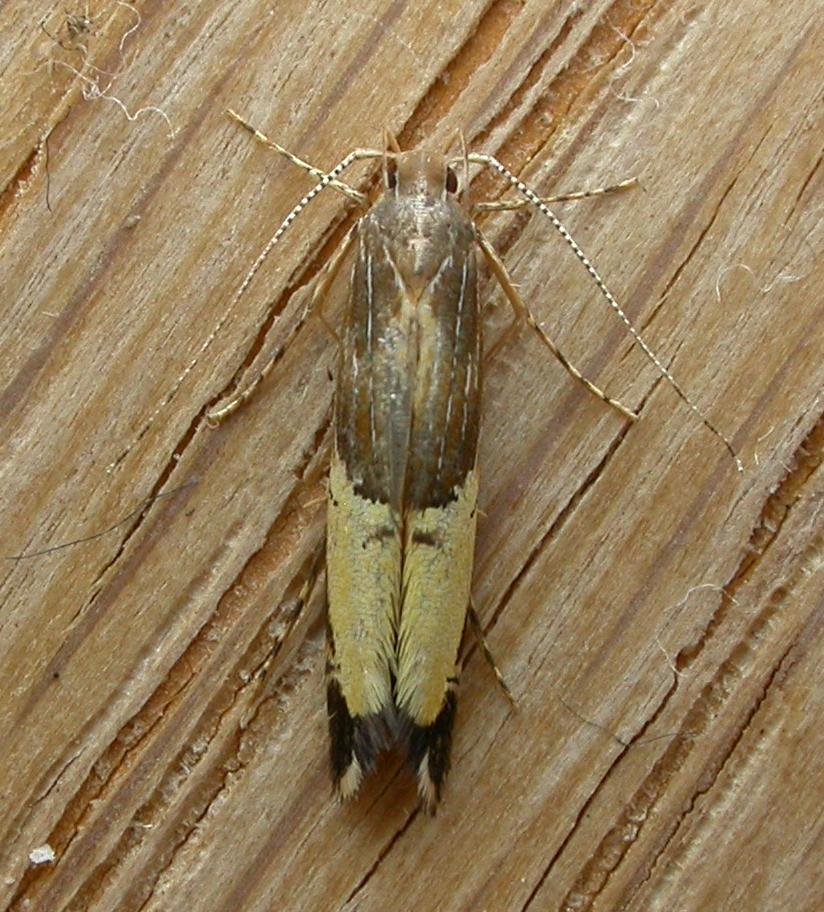
- Labdia deliciosella

Scientific classification
- Kingdom: Animalia
- Phylum: Arthropoda
- Class: Insecta
- Order: Lepidoptera
- Family: Cosmopterigidae
- Subfamily: Cosmopteriginae
- Genus: Labdia; Walker, 1864

= Labdia =

Genus of moths

Labdia is a genus of moths in the family Cosmopterigidae.

== Species ==
- Labdia acmostacta Meyrick, 1932 (Java)
- Labdia acroplecta (Meyrick, 1915) (Sri Lanka)
- Labdia aeolochorda Meyrick, 1927 (Samoa)
- Labdia albilineella (van Deventer, 1904) (Java)
- Labdia albimaculella (van Deventer, 1904) (Java)
- Labdia allotriopa Meyrick, 1923 (Fiji)
- Labdia amphipterna (Meyrick, 1917 (India, Coorg)
- Labdia anarithma (Meyrick, 1889) (Australia, New Zealand)
- Labdia ancylosema Turner, 1923 (Australia, Northern Territory)
- Labdia antenella Sinev & Park, 1994 (South Korea)
- Labdia antinopa (Meyrick, 1917) (Sri Lanka)
- Labdia apenthes Turner, 1939 (Tasmania)
- Labdia aphanogramma Meyrick, 1931 (southern India)
- Labdia aprepes Bradley, 1961 (Salomon Islands)
- Labdia arachnitis (Meyrick, 1907) (Sri Lanka)
- Labdia aresta Turner, 1926 (Australia, Queensland)
- Labdia argophracta Turner, 1923 (Australia, Queensland)
- Labdia argyropla Meyrick, 1927 (Samoa)
- Labdia argyrostrepta (Meyrick, 1897) (Australia, New South Wales)
- Labdia argyrozona (Lower, 1904) (Australia, Queensland)
- Labdia arimaspia (Meyrick, 1897) (Australia, Tasmania)
- Labdia auchmerodes Turner, 1939 (Tasmania)
- Labdia autotoma (Meyrick, 1919) (Australia, Tasmania)
- Labdia bathrosema (Meyrick, 1897 (Australia, Queensland)
- Labdia bicolorella (Snellen, 1901 (Java)
- Labdia bitabulata Meyrick, 1935 (Taiwan)
- Labdia bryomima (Meyrick, 1897) (Australia, New South Wales)
- Labdia calida Meyrick, 1921 (Fiji)
- Labdia callibrocha (Meyrick, 1915) (India)
- Labdia calthula Turner, 1923 (Australia, Queensland)
- Labdia calypta Bradley, 1961 (Solomon Islands)
- Labdia caroli Koster, 2008 (India, Kashmir)
- Labdia catapneusta (Meyrick, 1917) (Sri Lanka)
- Labdia caudata (Meyrick, 1917) (Sri Lanka)
- Labdia caulota Meyrick, 1918 (South Africa)
- Labdia cedrinopa Meyrick, 1928 (New Hebrides)
- Labdia ceraunia (Meyrick, 1897) (Australia, Queensland)
- Labdia ceriocosma Meyrick, 1934
- Labdia chalcoplecta Turner, 1933 (Australia, Queensland)
- Labdia charisia (Meyrick, 1897) (Australia)
- Labdia chionopsamma (Meyrick, 1886) (New Guinea)
- Labdia chryselecta (Meyrick, 1897) (Australia, Queensland)
- Labdia chrysophoenicea (Meyrick, 1897) (Australia, Queensland)
- Labdia chrysosoma Meyrick, 1928 (New Ireland)
- Labdia citracma Meyrick, 1915 (India)
- Labdia citroglypta Meyrick, 1928 (New Britain)
- Labdia clodiana Meyrick, 1927 (New Hebrides)
- Labdia clopaea (Meyrick, 1917) (Sri Lanka)
- Labdia clytemnestra Meyrick, 1923 (Fiji)
- Labdia compar Meyrick, 1921 (Java)
- Labdia cosmangela Meyrick, 1923 (Australia, Queensland)
- Labdia cremasta (Meyrick, 1915) (India)
- Labdia croccocarpa Meyrick, 1928 (New Hebrides)
- Labdia crocotypa Turner, 1923 (Australia, Queensland)
- Labdia cyanocoma Meyrick, 1922 (Peru)
- Labdia cyanodora Meyrick, 1935 (India)
- Labdia cyanogramma (Meyrick, 1897) (Australia, New South Wales)
- Labdia deianira Meyrick, 1927 (Samoa)
- Labdia deliciosella Walker, 1864 (Australia)
- Labdia dicarpa Meyrick, 1927 (Samoa)
- Labdia dicyanitis Meyrick, 1934 (Rapa Iti)
- Labdia diophanes Meyrick, 1928 (Zimbabwe)
- Labdia dolomella Bradley, 1961 (Salomon Islands)
- Labdia drosophanes (Meyrick, 1921) (India)
- Labdia echioglossa Meyrick, 1928 (Peninsular Malaysia)
- Labdia ejaculata Meyrick, 1921 (Australia, Queensland)
- Labdia embrochota (Meyrick, 1914) (Malawi)
- Labdia emphanopa Meyrick, 1922 (India)
- Labdia erebopleura Meyrick, 1922 (Borneo, Kalimantan)
- Labdia eugrapta Meyrick, 1927 (Samoa)
- Labdia eumelaena (Meyrick, 1897) (Australia)
- Labdia faceta (Meyrick, 1917) (India, Sri Lanka)
- Labdia fasciella Sinev, 1993 (Russian Far East)
- Labdia fletcherella Bradley, 1951 (India)
- Labdia gastroptila Meyrick, 1931 (India)
- Labdia glaucoxantha Meyrick, 1921 (Australia, Queensland)
- Labdia gypsodelta Meyrick, 1927 (Samoa)
- Labdia halticopa Meyrick, 1927 (Samoa)
- Labdia hastifera Meyrick, 1920 (Fiji)
- Labdia helena Meyrick, 1928 (New Ireland)
- Labdia hexaspila Turner, 1923 (Australia, New South Wales)
- Labdia hieracha (Meyrick, 1897) (Australia, Queensland)
- Labdia holopetra Meyrick, 1927 (Samoa)
- Labdia ilarcha (Meyrick, 1911) (the Seychelles)
- Labdia incompta (Meyrick, 1917) (India)
- Labdia inodes Meyrick, 1922 (India)
- Labdia internexa Meyrick, 1927 (Samoa)
- Labdia intuens Meyrick, 1923 (Fiji)
- Labdia iolampra Meyrick, 1938 (China, Yunnan)
- Labdia ioxantha (Meyrick, 1915) (Sri Lanka)
- Labdia irigramma Meyrick, 1927 (Samoa)
- Labdia irimetalla Meyrick, 1933 (Zaire)
- Labdia irrigua (Meyrick, 1915) (Australia, Northern Territory)
- Labdia ischnotypa Turner, 1923 (Australia, Queensland)
- Labdia isomerista Bradley, 1961 (Salomon Islands)
- Labdia issikii Kuroko, 1892 (Japan)
- Labdia leptonoma Meyrick, 1927 (Samoa)
- Labdia leucatella (Snellen, 1901 (Java)
- Labdia leucombra (Meyrick, 1897) (Australia, Queensland)
- Labdia leuconota Turner, 1923 (Australia, Queensland)
- Labdia liolitha Meyrick, 1922 (India)
- Labdia macrobela Meyrick, 1918 (Mozambique)
- Labdia microchalca Meyrick, 1921 (Australia, Queensland)
- Labdia microdictyas Meyrick, 1923 (Fiji)
- Labdia microglena (Meyrick, 1915) (Sri Lanka)
- Labdia mitrophora Turner, 1923 (Australia, Queensland)
- Labdia molybdaula (Meyrick, 1915) (India)
- Labdia myrrhicoma (Meyrick, 1917) (Australia, Queensland)
- Labdia nesophora (Meyrick, 1897) (Australia)
- Labdia niphocera Turner, 1923 (Australia)
- Labdia niphostephes Turner, 1923 (Australia, Queensland)
- Labdia niphosticta (Meyrick, 1936) (Japan)
- Labdia niphoxantha Meyrick, 1930 (India)
- Labdia notochorda (Meyrick, 1907) (Sri Lanka)
- Labdia nutrix Meyrick, 1928 (India)
- Labdia ochrostephana Turner, 1923 (Australia)
- Labdia ochrotypa Bradley, 1961 (Salomon Islands)
- Labdia orthoschema Turner, 1923 (Australia)
- Labdia orthritis Meyrick, 1930 (Fiji)
- Labdia oxycharis Meyrick, 1921 (Java)
- Labdia oxychlora Meyrick, 1932 (Sierra Leone)
- Labdia oxyleuca (Meyrick, 1915) (Sri Lanka)
- Labdia oxysema (Meyrick, 1897) (Australia, Queensland)
- Labdia oxytoma (Meyrick, 1897) (Australia, Tasmania)
- Labdia pammeces Turner, 1923 (Australia, Queensland)
- Labdia pantopyrta Turner, 1923 (Australia, Queensland)
- Labdia paropis (Meyrick, 1915) (Sri Lanka)
- Labdia pentachrysis (Meyrick, 1931) (Java)
- Labdia petroxesta Meyrick, 1921 (Fiji)
- Labdia phaeocala Turner, 1926 (Australia, Queensland)
- Labdia picrochalca Meyrick, 1937
- Labdia pileata (Meyrick, 1897) (Australia, North South Wales)
- Labdia planetopa (Meyrick, 1915) (Sri Lanka)
- Labdia promacha (Meyrick, 1897) (Australia, New South Wales)
- Labdia properans Meyrick, 1927 (Samoa)
- Labdia psarodes Bradley, 1961 (Solomon Islands)
- Labdia pyrrhota (Meyrick, 1915) (Sri Lanka)
- Labdia rationalis Meyrick, 1921 (Fiji)
- Labdia redimita (Meyrick, 1917) (India)
- Labdia rhadinopis Turner, 1923 (Australia, Queensland)
- Labdia rhectaula Meyrick, 1927 (Samoa)
- Labdia rheocosticha Turner, 1923 (Australia, Queensland)
- Labdia saliens Meyrick, 1928 (New Hebrides)
- Labdia saponacea Meyrick, 1922 (India
- Labdia sarcodryas Meyrick, 1922 (India)
- Labdia scenodoxa Meyrick, 1923 (Fiji)
- Labdia schismatias (Meyrick, 1897) (Australia, Queensland)
- Labdia selenopis (Meyrick, 1905) (Sri Lanka)
- Labdia semicoccinea (Stainton, 1859) (India)
- Labdia semiramis Meyrick, 1930
- Labdia semnolitha Meyrick, 1928 (New Hebrides)
- Labdia sirenia (Meyrick, 1917) (Sri Lanka)
- Labdia sophista (Meyrick, 1917) (Sri Lanka)
- Labdia sphenoclina Meyrick, 1922 (India)
- Labdia spirocosma Meyrick, 1921 (Fiji)
- Labdia stagmatophorella Sinev, 1993 (Russian Far East)
- Labdia stibogramma Meyrick, 1924 (Malaya)
- Labdia symbolias (Meyrick, 1906 (Australia, Queensland)
- Labdia terenopa (Meyrick, 1917) (Sri Lanka)
- Labdia thalamaula (Meyrick, 1915) (Australia, Queensland)
- Labdia thermophila (Lower, 1900) (Australia, New South Wales)
- Labdia torodoxa Meyrick, 1928 (New Hebrides)
- Labdia tribrachynta Meyrick, 1928 (India)
- Labdia trichaeola Meyrick, 1933 (Java)
- Labdia triploa Turner, 1923 (Australia, Queensland)
- Labdia tristoecha Turner, 1923 (Australia, Queensland)
- Labdia trivincta (Meyrick, 1897) (Australia, New South Wales)
- Labdia xylinaula Meyrick, 1935 (India)
- Labdia zunobela Turner, 1923 (Australia, Queensland)

== Selected former species ==
- Labdia philocarpa (Meyrick, 1921)
