= Labdia ilarcha =

Scientific classification
- Domain: Eukaryota
- Kingdom: Animalia
- Phylum: Arthropoda
- Class: Insecta
- Order: Lepidoptera
- Family: Cosmopterigidae
- Genus: Labdia
- Species: L. ilarcha

Binomial name
- Labdia ilarcha (Meyrick, 1911)

Synonyms
- Stagmatophora ilarcha Meyrick, 1911

Species of moth

Labdia ilarcha is a moth in the family Cosmopterigidae. It was described by Edward Meyrick in 1911. It is known from the Seychelles in the Indian Ocean.
