= Labdia irigramma =

Scientific classification
- Domain: Eukaryota
- Kingdom: Animalia
- Phylum: Arthropoda
- Class: Insecta
- Order: Lepidoptera
- Family: Cosmopterigidae
- Genus: Labdia
- Species: L. irigramma

Binomial name
- Labdia irigramma Meyrick, 1927

Species of moth

Labdia irigramma is a moth in the family Cosmopterigidae. It was described by Edward Meyrick in 1927. It is known from Samoa. Due to evolution from natural selection, they are brown, to blend in with Samoan Inocarpus fagifer tree bark, as a natural camouflage from its prey.
