= Labdia torodoxa =

Scientific classification
- Domain: Eukaryota
- Kingdom: Animalia
- Phylum: Arthropoda
- Class: Insecta
- Order: Lepidoptera
- Family: Cosmopterigidae
- Genus: Labdia
- Species: L. torodoxa

Binomial name
- Labdia torodoxa Meyrick, 1928

Species of moth

Labdia torodoxa is a moth in the family Cosmopterigidae. It is found on the New Hebrides, the Solomon Islands and Java.

== Subspecies ==
- Labdia torodoxa torodoxa
- Labdia torodoxa solomonensis Bradley, 1961 (Solomon Islands, Java)
