= Labdia glaucoxantha =

Scientific classification
- Domain: Eukaryota
- Kingdom: Animalia
- Phylum: Arthropoda
- Class: Insecta
- Order: Lepidoptera
- Family: Cosmopterigidae
- Genus: Labdia
- Species: L. glaucoxantha

Binomial name
- Labdia glaucoxantha Meyrick, 1921

Species of moth

Labdia glaucoxantha is a moth in the family Cosmopterigidae. It was described by Edward Meyrick in 1921. It is found in Australia, where it has been recorded from Queensland.
