= Labdia inodes =

Scientific classification
- Domain: Eukaryota
- Kingdom: Animalia
- Phylum: Arthropoda
- Class: Insecta
- Order: Lepidoptera
- Family: Cosmopterigidae
- Genus: Labdia
- Species: L. inodes

Binomial name
- Labdia inodes (Meyrick, 1922)

Species of moth

Labdia inodes is a moth in the family Cosmopterigidae. It was described by Edward Meyrick in 1922. It is known from India.
