= Labdia myrrhicoma =

Scientific classification
- Kingdom: Animalia
- Phylum: Arthropoda
- Class: Insecta
- Order: Lepidoptera
- Family: Cosmopterigidae
- Genus: Labdia
- Species: L. myrrhicoma

Binomial name
- Labdia myrrhicoma (Meyrick, 1917)

Synonyms
- Pyroderces myrrhicoma Meyrick, 1917; Tanygona myrrhicoma

Species of moth

Labdia myrrhicoma is a moth in the family Cosmopterigidae. It was described by Edward Meyrick in 1917. It is found in Australia, where it has been recorded from Queensland.
