= Labdia stagmatophorella =

Scientific classification
- Kingdom: Animalia
- Phylum: Arthropoda
- Clade: Pancrustacea
- Class: Insecta
- Order: Lepidoptera
- Family: Cosmopterigidae
- Genus: Labdia
- Species: L. stagmatophorella

Binomial name
- Labdia stagmatophorella Sinev, 1993

Species of moth

Labdia stagmatophorella is a moth in the family Cosmopterigidae. It is found in the Russian Far East and Japan.
