= Labdia oxychlora =

Scientific classification
- Kingdom: Animalia
- Phylum: Arthropoda
- Class: Insecta
- Order: Lepidoptera
- Family: Cosmopterigidae
- Genus: Labdia
- Species: L. oxychlora

Binomial name
- Labdia oxychlora Meyrick, 1932

Species of moth

Labdia oxychlora is a moth in the family Cosmopterigidae. It is found in Sierra Leone.
