= Labdia niphocera =

Scientific classification
- Domain: Eukaryota
- Kingdom: Animalia
- Phylum: Arthropoda
- Class: Insecta
- Order: Lepidoptera
- Family: Cosmopterigidae
- Genus: Labdia
- Species: L. niphocera

Binomial name
- Labdia niphocera Turner, 1923

Species of moth

Labdia niphocera is a moth in the family Cosmopterigidae. It was described by Alfred Jefferis Turner in 1923. It is found in Australia, where it has been recorded from Queensland.
