= Limnaecia iriastis =

Scientific classification
- Kingdom: Animalia
- Phylum: Arthropoda
- Clade: Pancrustacea
- Class: Insecta
- Order: Lepidoptera
- Family: Cosmopterigidae
- Genus: Limnaecia
- Species: L. iriastis

Binomial name
- Limnaecia iriastis Meyrick, 1897

Synonyms
- Limnoecia iriastis Meyrick, 1897

Species of moth

Limnaecia iriastis is a moth of the family Cosmopterigidae. It is known from Australia.
