= Limnaecia dasytricha =

Scientific classification
- Kingdom: Animalia
- Phylum: Arthropoda
- Clade: Pancrustacea
- Class: Insecta
- Order: Lepidoptera
- Family: Cosmopterigidae
- Genus: Limnaecia
- Species: L. dasytricha

Binomial name
- Limnaecia dasytricha (Meyrick, 1917)

Synonyms
- Limnoecia dasytricha Meyrick, 1917

Species of moth

Limnaecia dasytricha is a moth in the family Cosmopterigidae. It was described by Edward Meyrick in 1917. It is found in Guyana.
