= Limnaecia trissodesma =

Scientific classification
- Kingdom: Animalia
- Phylum: Arthropoda
- Clade: Pancrustacea
- Class: Insecta
- Order: Lepidoptera
- Family: Cosmopterigidae
- Genus: Limnaecia
- Species: L. trissodesma

Binomial name
- Limnaecia trissodesma (Meyrick, 1887)

Synonyms
- Ptilochares trissodesma Meyrick, 1887

Species of moth

Limnaecia trissodesma is a moth of the family Cosmopterigidae. It is known from Australia.
