= Limnaecia pamphaea =

Scientific classification
- Kingdom: Animalia
- Phylum: Arthropoda
- Clade: Pancrustacea
- Class: Insecta
- Order: Lepidoptera
- Family: Cosmopterigidae
- Genus: Limnaecia
- Species: L. pamphaea

Binomial name
- Limnaecia pamphaea Bradley, 1965

Species of moth

Limnaecia pamphaea is a moth in the family Cosmopterigidae. It is found in Uganda.
