= Limnaecia compsasis =

Scientific classification
- Kingdom: Animalia
- Phylum: Arthropoda
- Clade: Pancrustacea
- Class: Insecta
- Order: Lepidoptera
- Family: Cosmopterigidae
- Genus: Limnaecia
- Species: L. compsasis

Binomial name
- Limnaecia compsasis (Meyrick, 1935)

Synonyms
- Limnoecia compsasis Meyrick, 1935

Species of moth

Limnaecia compsasis is a moth in the family Cosmopterigidae. It is found in China.
