= Limnaecia metallifera =

Scientific classification
- Kingdom: Animalia
- Phylum: Arthropoda
- Clade: Pancrustacea
- Class: Insecta
- Order: Lepidoptera
- Family: Cosmopterigidae
- Genus: Limnaecia
- Species: L. metallifera

Binomial name
- Limnaecia metallifera (Walsingham, 1897)

Synonyms
- Anybia metallifera Walsingham, 1897

Species of moth

Limnaecia metallifera is a moth in the family Cosmopterigidae. It is found in the West Indies.
