= Limnaecia capsigera =

Scientific classification
- Kingdom: Animalia
- Phylum: Arthropoda
- Clade: Pancrustacea
- Class: Insecta
- Order: Lepidoptera
- Family: Cosmopterigidae
- Genus: Limnaecia
- Species: L. capsigera

Binomial name
- Limnaecia capsigera (Meyrick, 1921)

Synonyms
- Limnoecia capsigera Meyrick, 1921

Species of moth

Limnaecia capsigera is a moth in the family Cosmopterigidae. It is found on Fiji.
