= Limnaecia enclista =

Scientific classification
- Kingdom: Animalia
- Phylum: Arthropoda
- Clade: Pancrustacea
- Class: Insecta
- Order: Lepidoptera
- Family: Cosmopterigidae
- Genus: Limnaecia
- Species: L. enclista

Binomial name
- Limnaecia enclista (Meyrick, 1921)

Synonyms
- Limnoecia enclista Meyrick, 1921

Species of moth

Limnaecia enclista is a moth in the family Cosmopterigidae. It is found on Java.
