= Limnaecia conjuncta =

Scientific classification
- Kingdom: Animalia
- Phylum: Arthropoda
- Clade: Pancrustacea
- Class: Insecta
- Order: Lepidoptera
- Family: Cosmopterigidae
- Genus: Limnaecia
- Species: L. conjuncta

Binomial name
- Limnaecia conjuncta (Meyrick, 1921)

Synonyms
- Limnoecia conjuncta Meyrick, 1921

Species of moth

Limnaecia conjuncta is a moth in the family Cosmopterigidae. It is found in Mozambique.
