= Limnaecia scaeosema =

Scientific classification
- Kingdom: Animalia
- Phylum: Arthropoda
- Clade: Pancrustacea
- Class: Insecta
- Order: Lepidoptera
- Family: Cosmopterigidae
- Genus: Limnaecia
- Species: L. scaeosema

Binomial name
- Limnaecia scaeosema (Meyrick, 1905)

Synonyms
- Pyroderces scaeosema Meyrick, 1905

Species of moth

Limnaecia scaeosema is a moth in the family Cosmopterigidae. It is found in Sri Lanka.
