= Limnaecia xanthopelta =

Scientific classification
- Kingdom: Animalia
- Phylum: Arthropoda
- Clade: Pancrustacea
- Class: Insecta
- Order: Lepidoptera
- Family: Cosmopterigidae
- Genus: Limnaecia
- Species: L. xanthopelta

Binomial name
- Limnaecia xanthopelta Lower, 1903

Synonyms
- Limnoecia xanthopelta Lower, 1903

Species of moth

Limnaecia xanthopelta is a moth of the family Cosmopterigidae. It is known from Australia.
