= Limnaecia trisema =

Scientific classification
- Kingdom: Animalia
- Phylum: Arthropoda
- Clade: Pancrustacea
- Class: Insecta
- Order: Lepidoptera
- Family: Cosmopterigidae
- Genus: Limnaecia
- Species: L. trisema

Binomial name
- Limnaecia trisema Meyrick, 1897

Synonyms
- Limnoecia trisema Meyrick, 1897

Species of moth

Limnaecia trisema is a moth of the family Cosmopterigidae. It is known from Australia, where it has been recorded from Tasmania.
