= Limnaecia cassandra =

Scientific classification
- Kingdom: Animalia
- Phylum: Arthropoda
- Clade: Pancrustacea
- Class: Insecta
- Order: Lepidoptera
- Family: Cosmopterigidae
- Genus: Limnaecia
- Species: L. cassandra

Binomial name
- Limnaecia cassandra (Meyrick, 1915)

Synonyms
- Xestocasis cassandra Meyrick, 1915; Callixestis cassandra

Species of insect

Limnaecia cassandra is a moth in the family Cosmopterigidae. It was first described by Edward Meyrick and is found in Sri Lanka.
