= Limnaecia effulgens =

Scientific classification
- Kingdom: Animalia
- Phylum: Arthropoda
- Clade: Pancrustacea
- Class: Insecta
- Order: Lepidoptera
- Family: Cosmopterigidae
- Genus: Limnaecia
- Species: L. effulgens

Binomial name
- Limnaecia effulgens Meyrick, 1918

Synonyms
- Limnoecia effulgens Meyrick, 1918

Species of moth

Limnaecia effulgens is a moth in the family Cosmopterigidae. It is found in South Africa.
