= Limnaecia melanoma =

Scientific classification
- Kingdom: Animalia
- Phylum: Arthropoda
- Clade: Pancrustacea
- Class: Insecta
- Order: Lepidoptera
- Family: Cosmopterigidae
- Genus: Limnaecia
- Species: L. melanoma

Binomial name
- Limnaecia melanoma (Lower, 1897)

Synonyms
- Ptilochares melanoma Lower, 1897

Species of moth

Limnaecia melanoma is a moth in the family Cosmopterigidae. It is found in Australia, where it has been recorded from Victoria.

The wingspan is about 22 mm (0.87 in). The forewings white and the hindwings are fuscous.
