= Limnaecia recidiva =

Scientific classification
- Kingdom: Animalia
- Phylum: Arthropoda
- Clade: Pancrustacea
- Class: Insecta
- Order: Lepidoptera
- Family: Cosmopterigidae
- Genus: Limnaecia
- Species: L. recidiva

Binomial name
- Limnaecia recidiva Meyrick, 1911

Synonyms
- Limnoecia recidiva Meyrick, 1911

Species of moth

Limnaecia recidiva is a moth in the family Cosmopterigidae. It is found in South Africa.
