= Limnaecia xanthopis =

Scientific classification
- Kingdom: Animalia
- Phylum: Arthropoda
- Clade: Pancrustacea
- Class: Insecta
- Order: Lepidoptera
- Family: Cosmopterigidae
- Genus: Limnaecia
- Species: L. xanthopis

Binomial name
- Limnaecia xanthopis Meyrick, 1920

Synonyms
- Limnoecia xanthopis Meyrick, 1920

Species of moth

Limnaecia xanthopis is a moth of the family Cosmopterigidae. It is known from Australia.
