= Limnaecia isodesma =

Scientific classification
- Kingdom: Animalia
- Phylum: Arthropoda
- Clade: Pancrustacea
- Class: Insecta
- Order: Lepidoptera
- Family: Cosmopterigidae
- Genus: Limnaecia
- Species: L. isodesma

Binomial name
- Limnaecia isodesma Lower, 1904

Synonyms
- Limnoecia isodesma Lower, 1904

Species of moth

Limnaecia isodesma is a moth of the family Cosmopterigidae. It is known to come from Australia.
