= Limnaecia loxoscia =

Scientific classification
- Kingdom: Animalia
- Phylum: Arthropoda
- Clade: Pancrustacea
- Class: Insecta
- Order: Lepidoptera
- Family: Cosmopterigidae
- Genus: Limnaecia
- Species: L. loxoscia

Binomial name
- Limnaecia loxoscia Lower, 1923

Synonyms
- Limnoecia loxoscia Lower, 1923

Species of moth

Limnaecia loxoscia is a moth of the family Cosmopterigidae. It is known from Australia, where it has been recorded from New South Wales.
