= Limnaecia trissodelta =

Scientific classification
- Kingdom: Animalia
- Phylum: Arthropoda
- Clade: Pancrustacea
- Class: Insecta
- Order: Lepidoptera
- Family: Cosmopterigidae
- Genus: Limnaecia
- Species: L. trissodelta

Binomial name
- Limnaecia trissodelta (Meyrick, 1922)

Synonyms
- Limnoecia trissodelta Meyrick, 1922

Species of moth

Limnaecia trissodelta is a moth in the family Cosmopterigidae. It is found in India.
