= Limnaecia xanthotyla =

Scientific classification
- Kingdom: Animalia
- Phylum: Arthropoda
- Clade: Pancrustacea
- Class: Insecta
- Order: Lepidoptera
- Family: Cosmopterigidae
- Genus: Limnaecia
- Species: L. xanthotyla

Binomial name
- Limnaecia xanthotyla (Meyrick, 1930)

Synonyms
- Limnoecia xanthotyla Meyrick, 1930

Species of moth

Limnaecia xanthotyla is a moth in the family Cosmopterigidae. It is found on the Solomon Islands.
