= Limnaecia stenosticha =

Scientific classification
- Kingdom: Animalia
- Phylum: Arthropoda
- Clade: Pancrustacea
- Class: Insecta
- Order: Lepidoptera
- Family: Cosmopterigidae
- Genus: Limnaecia
- Species: L. stenosticha

Binomial name
- Limnaecia stenosticha Turner, 1926

Synonyms
- Limnoecia stenosticha Turner, 1926

Species of moth

Limnaecia stenosticha is a moth of the family Cosmopterigidae. It is found in Australia.
