= Limnaecia acontophora =

Scientific classification
- Kingdom: Animalia
- Phylum: Arthropoda
- Clade: Pancrustacea
- Class: Insecta
- Order: Lepidoptera
- Family: Cosmopterigidae
- Genus: Limnaecia
- Species: L. acontophora

Binomial name
- Limnaecia acontophora Meyrick, 1922

Species of moth

Limnaecia acontophora is a moth of the family Cosmopterigidae. It is known from Philippines (Luzon).
