= Limnaecia tyriarcha =

Scientific classification
- Kingdom: Animalia
- Phylum: Arthropoda
- Clade: Pancrustacea
- Class: Insecta
- Order: Lepidoptera
- Family: Cosmopterigidae
- Genus: Limnaecia
- Species: L. tyriarcha

Binomial name
- Limnaecia tyriarcha (Meyrick, 1919)

Synonyms
- Limnoecia tyriarcha Meyrick, 1919

Species of moth

Limnaecia tyriarcha is a moth in the family Cosmopterigidae. It is found in India.
