= Limnaecia lubricata =

Scientific classification
- Kingdom: Animalia
- Phylum: Arthropoda
- Clade: Pancrustacea
- Class: Insecta
- Order: Lepidoptera
- Family: Cosmopterigidae
- Genus: Limnaecia
- Species: L. lubricata

Binomial name
- Limnaecia lubricata (Meyrick, 1917)

Synonyms
- Callixestis lubricata Meyrick, 1917

Species of moth

Limnaecia lubricata is a moth in the family Cosmopterigidae. It is found in Sri Lanka.
