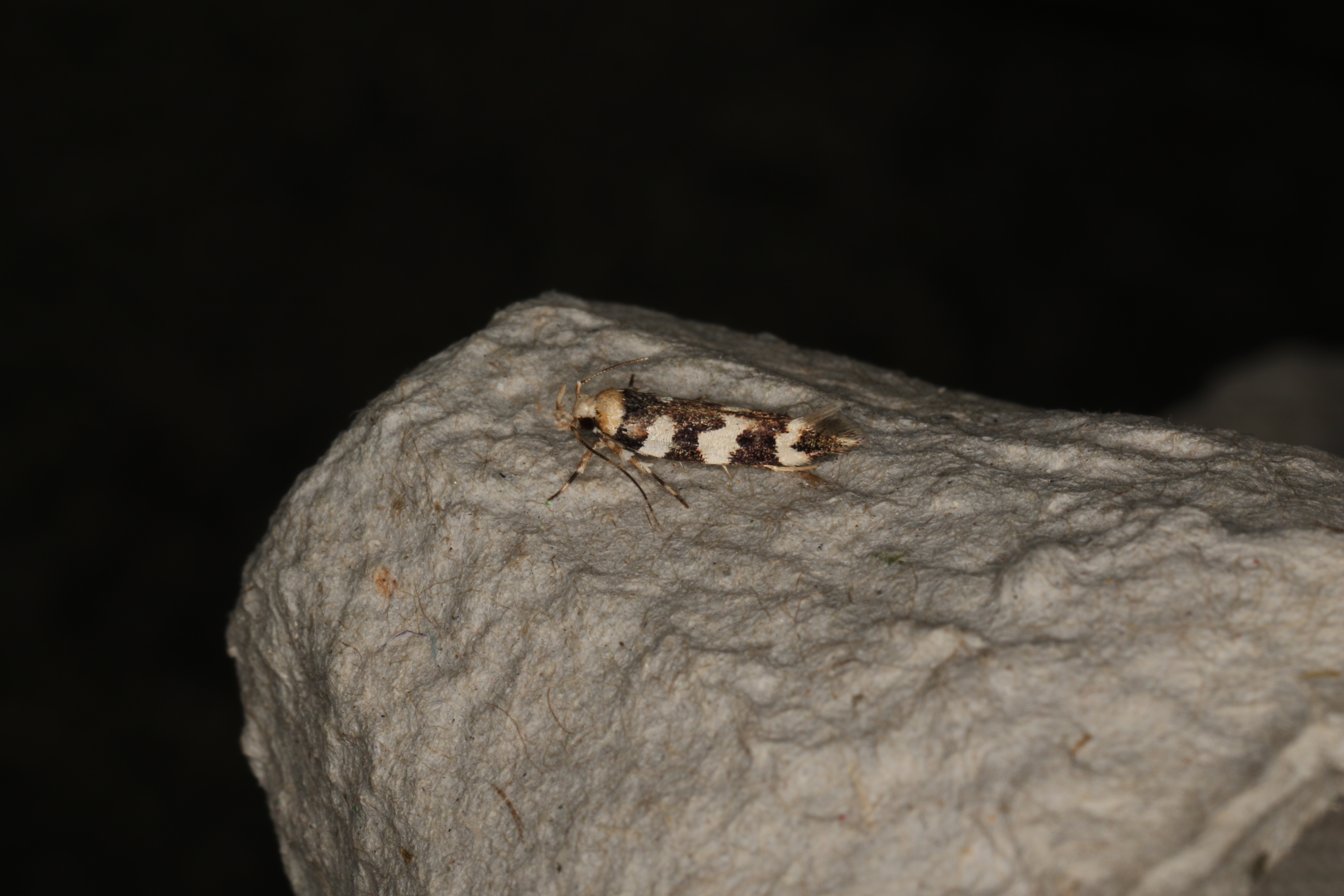

Scientific classification
- Kingdom: Animalia
- Phylum: Arthropoda
- Clade: Pancrustacea
- Class: Insecta
- Order: Lepidoptera
- Family: Cosmopterigidae
- Genus: Limnaecia
- Species: L. camptosema

Binomial name
- Limnaecia camptosema Meyrick, 1897

Synonyms
- Limnoecia camptosema Meyrick, 1897

= Limnaecia camptosema =

Species of moth

Limnaecia camptosema is a moth of the family Cosmopterigidae. It is known from Australia, where it has been recorded from Victoria.
