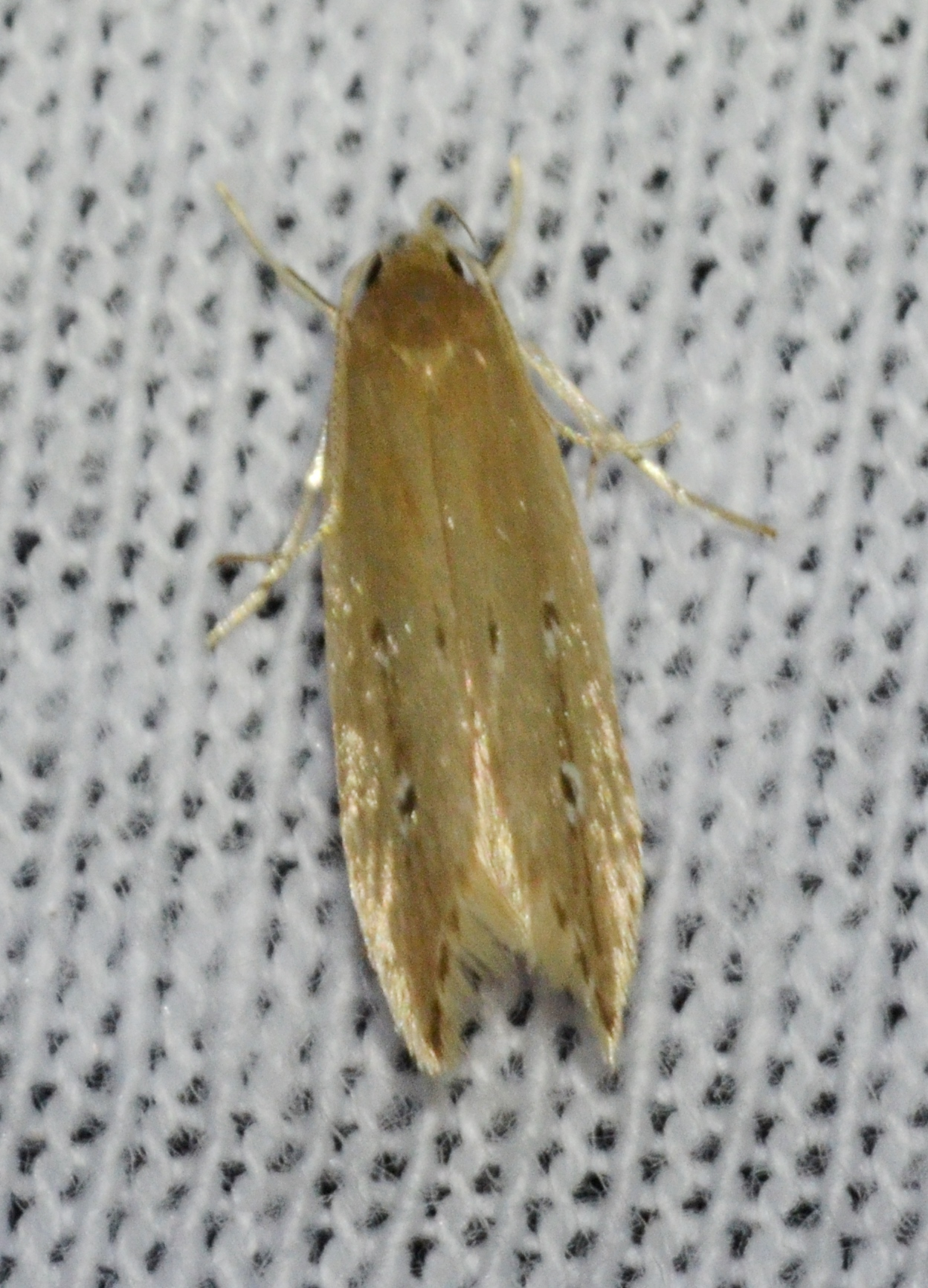

Scientific classification
- Kingdom: Animalia
- Phylum: Arthropoda
- Clade: Pancrustacea
- Class: Insecta
- Order: Lepidoptera
- Family: Cosmopterigidae
- Genus: Limnaecia
- Species: L. phragmitella

Binomial name
- Limnaecia phragmitella Stainton, 1851

Synonyms
- Limnoecia phragmitella Stainton, 1851

= Limnaecia phragmitella =

Species of moth

The shy cosmet moth (Limnaecia phragmitella) is a moth of the family Cosmopterigidae. It is known from all of Europe, as well as Asia, Australia and New Zealand. It is also present in North America, where it is distributed from Nova Scotia to Virginia, west to Oklahoma and north to Ontario. The habitat consists of fens and marshes.

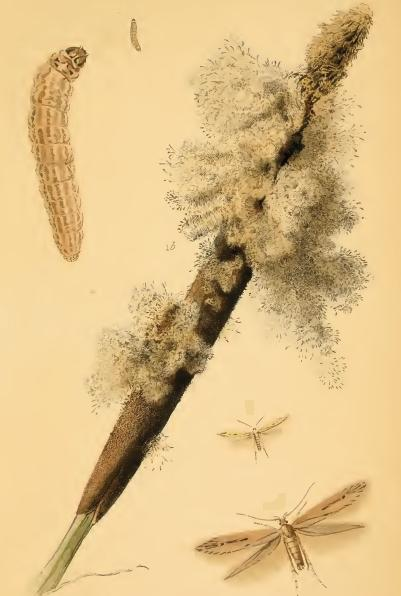
Imago, larva and Typha latifolia inflorescence, showing external effects of the larva inside it

The moth is about 15–22 mm (0.59–0.87 in).The head is ochre-coloured, the antennae are yellowish white, brown ringed and have an almost white apical area. The thorax and tegulae are ochre. The forewings are ochre in colour and pale yellow on the costa. An indistinct, grey-brown line follows the anal fold, with an elongated white spot in front of its distal end. In the middle of the wings there are two grey-brown, white-edged spots. The inner is located in front of half the length of the forewing, the outer at 3/4 of the length of the forewing. Both spots are connected by a grey-brown line that begins as a narrow line behind the base of the wings. In the apical area, the wing veining is grey-brown and occasionally outlined in white. A series of whitish dots runs along the apex. The fringed scales are pale ochre and become more yellowish towards the inner edge of the wings. The hind wings are grey. The abdomen is brownish grey, the segments have yellowish white bands at the back.

In the males, the brachia are extremely asymmetrical. The right brachium is long, pointed and strongly sclerotized. It is 2.5 times as long as the left one. The valves are concave and have a short and rounded cucullus. The right valve is wider at the base. The valvellae are strongly asymmetrical. The left valvella is spatula-shaped and longer than the valve. The tip is provided with a patch of short needles. The right valvella is short and curved and strongly sclerotized. It is fused with the right valve. The aedeagus is short and tapers to the tip. The proximal part is bulbous.

In females, the anal papillae are fused and only slightly sclerotized. The apophyses are very long and strong and strongly sclerotized. The sterigma is tubular, slightly curved and sclerotized. The ductus bursae tapers slightly towards the corpus bursae, the distal half is sclerotized. The corpus bursae is ovate and has two short-needled signa.

Adults are on wing in July in western Europe and from June to August in North America.
