= Limnaecia argophylla =

Scientific classification
- Kingdom: Animalia
- Phylum: Arthropoda
- Clade: Pancrustacea
- Class: Insecta
- Order: Lepidoptera
- Family: Cosmopterigidae
- Genus: Limnaecia
- Species: L. argophylla

Binomial name
- Limnaecia argophylla Bradley, 1961

Species of moth

Limnaecia argophylla is a moth in the family Cosmopterigidae. It is found on Guadalcanal.
