= Limnaecia anthophaga =

Scientific classification
- Kingdom: Animalia
- Phylum: Arthropoda
- Clade: Pancrustacea
- Class: Insecta
- Order: Lepidoptera
- Family: Cosmopterigidae
- Genus: Limnaecia
- Species: L. anthophaga

Binomial name
- Limnaecia anthophaga (Meyrick, 1928)

Synonyms
- Limnoecia anthophaga Meyrick, 1928

Species of moth

Limnaecia anthophaga is a moth in the family Cosmopterigidae. It is found on Fiji.
