= Limnaecia conspersa =

Scientific classification
- Kingdom: Animalia
- Phylum: Arthropoda
- Clade: Pancrustacea
- Class: Insecta
- Order: Lepidoptera
- Family: Cosmopterigidae
- Genus: Limnaecia
- Species: L. conspersa

Binomial name
- Limnaecia conspersa (Walsingham, 1892)

Synonyms
- Anybia conspersa Walsingham, 1892

Species of moth

Limnaecia conspersa is a moth in the family Cosmopterigidae. It is found in the West Indies.
