= Limnaecia inconcinna =

Scientific classification
- Kingdom: Animalia
- Phylum: Arthropoda
- Clade: Pancrustacea
- Class: Insecta
- Order: Lepidoptera
- Family: Cosmopterigidae
- Genus: Limnaecia
- Species: L. inconcinna

Binomial name
- Limnaecia inconcinna (Meyrick, 1923)

Synonyms
- Limnoecia inconcinna Meyrick, 1923

Species of moth

Limnaecia inconcinna is a moth in the family Cosmopterigidae. It is found on Fiji.

Hostplant: This species feeds on cotton: Gossypium arboreum (Malvaceae).
