= Limnaecia elaphropa =

Scientific classification
- Kingdom: Animalia
- Phylum: Arthropoda
- Clade: Pancrustacea
- Class: Insecta
- Order: Lepidoptera
- Family: Cosmopterigidae
- Genus: Limnaecia
- Species: L. elaphropa

Binomial name
- Limnaecia elaphropa Turner, 1923

Synonyms
- Limnoecia elaphropa Turner, 1923

Species of moth

Limnaecia elaphropa is a moth of the family Cosmopterigidae. It is known from Australia.
