= Limnaecia magnifica =

Scientific classification
- Kingdom: Animalia
- Phylum: Arthropoda
- Clade: Pancrustacea
- Class: Insecta
- Order: Lepidoptera
- Family: Cosmopterigidae
- Genus: Limnaecia
- Species: L. magnifica

Binomial name
- Limnaecia magnifica Amsel, 1968

Species of moth

Limnaecia magnifica is a moth in the family Cosmopterigidae. It is found in Pakistan.
