= Limnaecia melanosoma =

Scientific classification
- Kingdom: Animalia
- Phylum: Arthropoda
- Clade: Pancrustacea
- Class: Insecta
- Order: Lepidoptera
- Family: Cosmopterigidae
- Genus: Limnaecia
- Species: L. melanosoma

Binomial name
- Limnaecia melanosoma (Lower, 1897)

Synonyms
- Ptilochares melanosoma Lower, 1897

Species of moth

Limnaecia melanosoma is a moth in the family Cosmopterigidae. It is found in Australia, where it has been described from Victoria.
