= Limnaecia ensigera =

Scientific classification
- Kingdom: Animalia
- Phylum: Arthropoda
- Clade: Pancrustacea
- Class: Insecta
- Order: Lepidoptera
- Family: Cosmopterigidae
- Genus: Limnaecia
- Species: L. ensigera

Binomial name
- Limnaecia ensigera Diakonoff, 1954

Species of moth

Limnaecia ensigera is a moth in the family Cosmopterigidae. It is found in New Guinea.
