= Limnaecia proclina =

Scientific classification
- Kingdom: Animalia
- Phylum: Arthropoda
- Clade: Pancrustacea
- Class: Insecta
- Order: Lepidoptera
- Family: Cosmopterigidae
- Genus: Limnaecia
- Species: L. proclina

Binomial name
- Limnaecia proclina (Meyrick, 1907)

Synonyms
- Limnoecia proclina Meyrick, 1907

Species of moth

Limnaecia proclina is a moth in the family Cosmopterigidae. It is found in Sri Lanka.
