= Limnaecia polyactis =

Scientific classification
- Kingdom: Animalia
- Phylum: Arthropoda
- Clade: Pancrustacea
- Class: Insecta
- Order: Lepidoptera
- Family: Cosmopterigidae
- Genus: Limnaecia
- Species: L. polyactis

Binomial name
- Limnaecia polyactis Meyrick, 1921

Synonyms
- Limnoecia polyactis Meyrick, 1921

Species of moth

Limnaecia polyactis is a moth belonging to the family Cosmopterigidae. It is native to Australia.
