= Limnaecia polycydista =

Scientific classification
- Kingdom: Animalia
- Phylum: Arthropoda
- Clade: Pancrustacea
- Class: Insecta
- Order: Lepidoptera
- Family: Cosmopterigidae
- Genus: Limnaecia
- Species: L. polycydista

Binomial name
- Limnaecia polycydista Turner, 1926

Synonyms
- Limnoecia polycydista Turner, 1926

Species of moth

Limnaecia polycydista is a moth of the family Cosmopterigidae. It is known from Australia.
