= Limnaecia asterodes =

Scientific classification
- Kingdom: Animalia
- Phylum: Arthropoda
- Clade: Pancrustacea
- Class: Insecta
- Order: Lepidoptera
- Family: Cosmopterigidae
- Genus: Limnaecia
- Species: L. asterodes

Binomial name
- Limnaecia asterodes (Meyrick, 1915)

Synonyms
- Limnoecia asterodes Meyrick, 1915

Species of moth

Limnaecia asterodes is a moth in the family Cosmopterigidae. It is found in India.

The Limnaecia asterodes belongs to the genus Limnaecia and the family Cosmopterigidae. There are no listed subspecies of this kind.
