= Limnaecia heterozona =

Scientific classification
- Kingdom: Animalia
- Phylum: Arthropoda
- Clade: Pancrustacea
- Class: Insecta
- Order: Lepidoptera
- Family: Cosmopterigidae
- Genus: Limnaecia
- Species: L. heterozona

Binomial name
- Limnaecia heterozona Lower, 1904

Synonyms
- Limnoecia heterozona Lower, 1904

Species of moth

Limnaecia heterozona is a moth of the family Cosmopterigidae. It is known from Australia.
