= Limnaecia tetraplanetis =

Scientific classification
- Kingdom: Animalia
- Phylum: Arthropoda
- Clade: Pancrustacea
- Class: Insecta
- Order: Lepidoptera
- Family: Cosmopterigidae
- Genus: Limnaecia
- Species: L. tetraplanetis

Binomial name
- Limnaecia tetraplanetis Meyrick, 1897

Synonyms
- Limnoecia tetraplanetis Meyrick, 1897; Limnoecia tyrotoma Meyrick, 1938

Species of moth

Limnaecia tetraplanetis is a moth of the family Cosmopterigidae. It is known from Australia and New Guinea.
