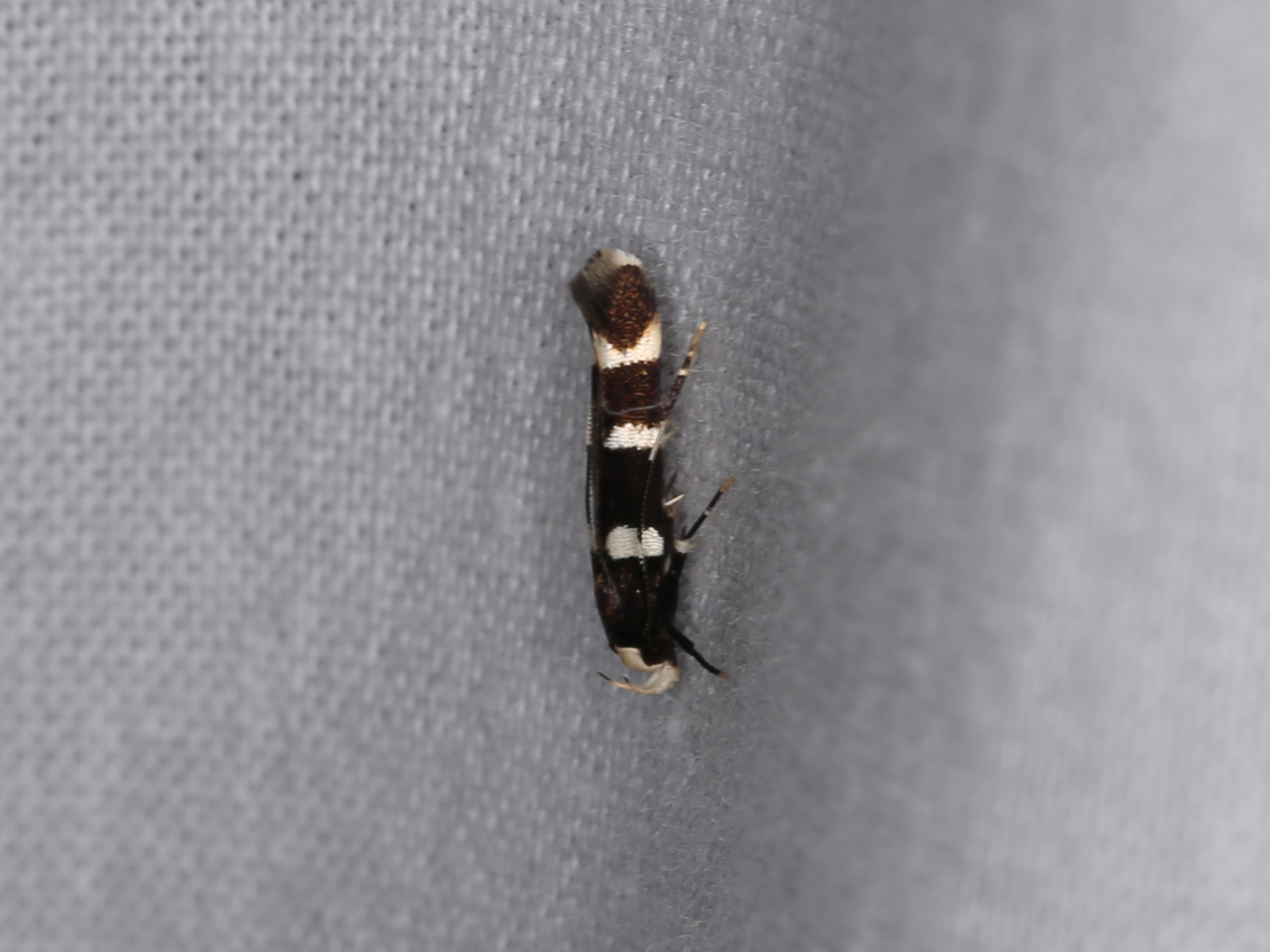

Scientific classification
- Kingdom: Animalia
- Phylum: Arthropoda
- Clade: Pancrustacea
- Class: Insecta
- Order: Lepidoptera
- Family: Cosmopterigidae
- Genus: Limnaecia
- Species: L. chionospila

Binomial name
- Limnaecia chionospila Meyrick, 1897

Synonyms
- Limnoecia chionospila Meyrick, 1897

= Limnaecia chionospila =

Species of moth

Limnaecia chionospila is a moth of the family Cosmopterigidae. It is known from Australia.
