= Limnaecia auximena =

Scientific classification
- Kingdom: Animalia
- Phylum: Arthropoda
- Clade: Pancrustacea
- Class: Insecta
- Order: Lepidoptera
- Family: Cosmopterigidae
- Genus: Limnaecia
- Species: L. auximena

Binomial name
- Limnaecia auximena (Meyrick, 1915)

Synonyms
- Limnoecia auximena Meyrick, 1915

Species of moth

Limnaecia auximena is a moth in the family Cosmopterigidae. It is found in India.
