= Limnaecia hemidoma =

Scientific classification
- Kingdom: Animalia
- Phylum: Arthropoda
- Clade: Pancrustacea
- Class: Insecta
- Order: Lepidoptera
- Family: Cosmopterigidae
- Genus: Limnaecia
- Species: L. hemidoma

Binomial name
- Limnaecia hemidoma Meyrick, 1897

Synonyms
- Limnoecia hemidoma Meyrick, 1897

Species of moth

Limnaecia hemidoma is a moth of the family Cosmopterigidae. It is known from Australia.
