= Limnaecia chrysidota =

Scientific classification
- Kingdom: Animalia
- Phylum: Arthropoda
- Clade: Pancrustacea
- Class: Insecta
- Order: Lepidoptera
- Family: Cosmopterigidae
- Genus: Limnaecia
- Species: L. chrysidota

Binomial name
- Limnaecia chrysidota (Meyrick, 1917)

Synonyms
- Callixestis chrysidota Meyrick, 1917

Species of moth

Limnaecia chrysidota is a moth in the family Cosmopterigidae. It is found in India.

The wingspan is about 13 mm (0.51 in). The forewings are ochreous-yellow, the base narrowly pale greyish. The hindwings are light grey.
