= Limnaecia neurogramma =

Scientific classification
- Kingdom: Animalia
- Phylum: Arthropoda
- Clade: Pancrustacea
- Class: Insecta
- Order: Lepidoptera
- Family: Cosmopterigidae
- Genus: Limnaecia
- Species: L. neurogramma

Binomial name
- Limnaecia neurogramma Meyrick, 1909

Synonyms
- Limnoecia neurogramma Meyrick, 1909

Species of moth

Limnaecia neurogramma is a moth in the family Cosmopterigidae. It is found in South Africa.
