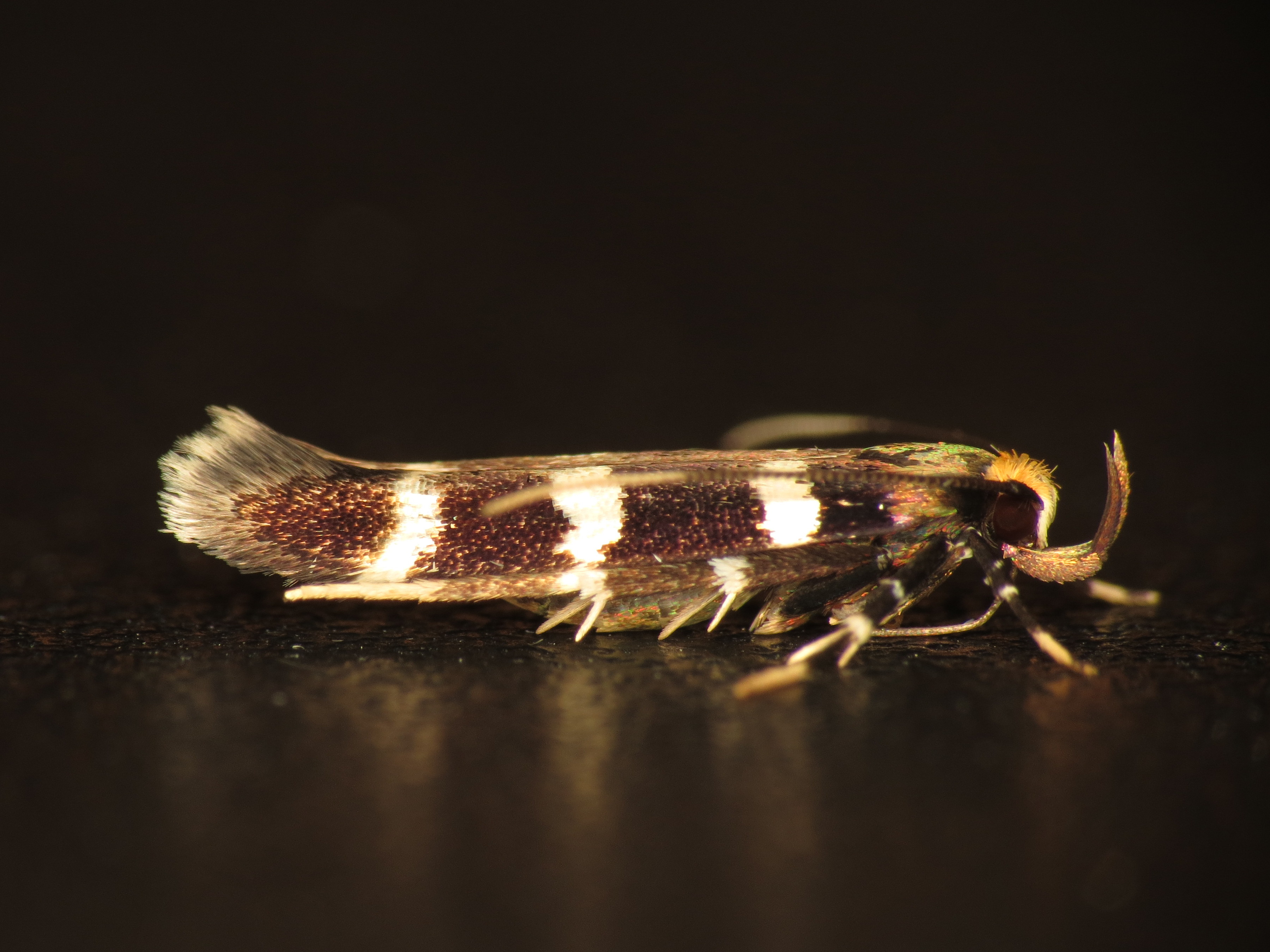
- Limnaecia sp.

Scientific classification
- Kingdom: Animalia
- Phylum: Arthropoda
- Class: Insecta
- Order: Lepidoptera
- Family: Cosmopterigidae
- Subfamily: Antequerinae
- Genus: Limnaecia; Stainton, 1851

Synonyms
- Limnaecia Stainton, 1851; Ptilochares Meyrick, 1887; Limnoecia Meyrick, 1895; Lymnaecia Dyar, 1903; Callixestis Meyrick, 1917; Erechthiodes Meyrick, 1914; Opszyga Lower, 1903; Thalerostoma Meyrick, 1917

= Limnaecia =

Genus of moths

Limnaecia is a genus of moths in the family Cosmopterigidae.

== Species ==
- Limnaecia acontophora
- Limnaecia adiacrita Turner, 1923
- Limnaecia amblopa
- Limnaecia ancilla
- Limnaecia anisodesma Lower, 1904
- Limnaecia anthophaga
- Limnaecia argophylla
- Limnaecia arsitricha
- Limnaecia asterodes
- Limnaecia audax
- Limnaecia auximena
- Limnaecia bilineata
- Limnaecia bisignis Meyrick, 1921
- Limnaecia callicosma
- Limnaecia callimitris Meyrick, 1897
- Limnaecia camptosema Meyrick, 1897
- Limnaecia capsigera
- Limnaecia cassandra
- Limnaecia charactis Meyrick, 1897
- Limnaecia chionospila Meyrick, 1897
- Limnaecia chlorodeta
- Limnaecia chloronephes
- Limnaecia chromaturga (Meyrick, 1915)
- Limnaecia chrysidota
- Limnaecia chrysonesa Meyrick, 1897
- Limnaecia chrysothorax Meyrick, 1920
- Limnaecia cirrhochrosta
- Limnaecia cirrhosema Turner, 1923
- Limnaecia cirrhozona Turner, 1923
- Limnaecia clinodesma
- Limnaecia combota
- Limnaecia compsasis
- Limnaecia conjuncta
- Limnaecia conspersa
- Limnaecia crocodelta
- Limnaecia crossomela Lower, 1908
- †Limnaecia cuprella
- Limnaecia cybophora Meyrick, 1897
- Limnaecia dasytricha Meyrick, 1917
- Limnaecia definitiva (T.P. Lucas, 1901)
- Limnaecia effulgens
- Limnaecia elaphropa Turner, 1923
- Limnaecia enclista
- Limnaecia ensigera
- Limnaecia epimictis Meyrick, 1897
- Limnaecia eretmota
- Limnaecia eristica Meyrick, 1919
- Limnaecia eugramma Lower, 1899
- Limnaecia eumeristis
- Limnaecia explanata
- Limnaecia fuscipalpis
- Limnaecia hemidoma Meyrick, 1897
- Limnaecia hemimitra Turner, 1923
- Limnaecia heterozona Lower, 1904
- Limnaecia ichnographa
- Limnaecia ida Lower, 1908
- Limnaecia inconcinna
- Limnaecia iriastis Meyrick, 1897
- Limnaecia isodesma Lower, 1904
- Limnaecia isozona Meyrick, 1897
- Limnaecia leptomeris Meyrick, 1897
- Limnaecia leptozona Turner, 1923
- Limnaecia leucomita Turner, 1923
- Limnaecia loxoscia Lower, 1923
- Limnaecia lubricata
- Limnaecia lunacrescens (T.P. Lucas, 1901)
- Limnaecia magica
- Limnaecia magnifica
- Limnaecia megalochlamys
- Limnaecia melanoma (Lower, 1897)
- Limnaecia melanosoma
- Limnaecia melileuca
- Limnaecia melliplanta
- Limnaecia mercuriella
- Limnaecia metacypha
- Limnaecia metallifera
- Limnaecia microglypta
- Limnaecia monoxantha (Meyrick, 1922)
- Limnaecia nephelochalca
- Limnaecia neurogramma
- Limnaecia nigrispersa
- Limnaecia novalis Meyrick, 1920
- Limnaecia ochrozona Meyrick, 1897
- Limnaecia orbigera Turner, 1923
- Limnaecia orthocentra
- Limnaecia orthochroa (Lower, 1899)
- Limnaecia pallidula Turner, 1923
- Limnaecia pamphaea
- Limnaecia parallelograpta
- Limnaecia peronodes
- Limnaecia perpusilla
- Limnaecia phaeopleura
- Limnaecia phragmitella Stainton, 1851
- Limnaecia piperatella
- Limnaecia platychlora Meyrick, 1915
- Limnaecia platyochra Turner, 1923
- Limnaecia platyscia Turner, 1923
- Limnaecia polyactis Meyrick, 1921
- Limnaecia polycydista Turner, 1926
- Limnaecia proclina
- Limnaecia psalidota
- Limnaecia pterolopha Meyrick, 1920
- Limnaecia pycnogramma
- Limnaecia pycnosaris
- Limnaecia recidiva
- Limnaecia sarcanthes
- Limnaecia scaeosema
- Limnaecia scoliosema Meyrick, 1897
- Limnaecia semisecta
- Limnaecia simplex
- Limnaecia stabilita
- Limnaecia stenosticha Turner, 1926
- Limnaecia symplecta Turner, 1923
- Limnaecia syntaracta Meyrick, 1897
- Limnaecia tetramitra
- Limnaecia tetraplanetis Meyrick, 1897
- Limnaecia thiosima
- Limnaecia triplaneta Meyrick, 1921
- Limnaecia tripunctata
- Limnaecia trisema Meyrick, 1897
- Limnaecia trissodelta
- Limnaecia trissodesma (Meyrick, 1887)
- Limnaecia trixantha
- Limnaecia tyriarcha
- Limnaecia xanthopelta Lower, 1903
- Limnaecia xanthopis Meyrick, 1920
- Limnaecia xanthotyla
- Limnaecia xylinella Snellen, 1902 (from Java)
- Limnaecia zonomacula Lower, 1908
- Limnaecia zotica Meyrick, 1921

L. astathopis probably belongs in Asymphorodes.
