= Limnaecia pycnogramma =

Scientific classification
- Kingdom: Animalia
- Phylum: Arthropoda
- Clade: Pancrustacea
- Class: Insecta
- Order: Lepidoptera
- Family: Cosmopterigidae
- Genus: Limnaecia
- Species: L. pycnogramma

Binomial name
- Limnaecia pycnogramma (Lower, 1918)

Synonyms
- Limnoecia pycnogramma Lower, 1918

Species of moth

Limnaecia pycnogramma is a moth in the family Cosmopterigidae. It is found in Australia, where it has been recorded from New South Wales.
