= Limnaecia metacypha =

Scientific classification
- Kingdom: Animalia
- Phylum: Arthropoda
- Clade: Pancrustacea
- Class: Insecta
- Order: Lepidoptera
- Family: Cosmopterigidae
- Genus: Limnaecia
- Species: L. metacypha

Binomial name
- Limnaecia metacypha (Meyrick, 1914)

Synonyms
- Limnoecia metacypha Meyrick, 1914

Species of moth

Limnaecia metacypha is a moth in the family Cosmopterigidae. It is found in Sri Lanka.
