= Limnaecia ichnographa =

Scientific classification
- Kingdom: Animalia
- Phylum: Arthropoda
- Clade: Pancrustacea
- Class: Insecta
- Order: Lepidoptera
- Family: Cosmopterigidae
- Genus: Limnaecia
- Species: L. ichnographa

Binomial name
- Limnaecia ichnographa Meyrick, 1908

Synonyms
- Limnoecia ichnographa Meyrick, 1908

Species of moth

Limnaecia ichnographa is a moth in the family Cosmopterigidae. It is found in South Africa.
