= Limnaecia trixantha =

Scientific classification
- Kingdom: Animalia
- Phylum: Arthropoda
- Clade: Pancrustacea
- Class: Insecta
- Order: Lepidoptera
- Family: Cosmopterigidae
- Genus: Limnaecia
- Species: L. trixantha

Binomial name
- Limnaecia trixantha (Lower, 1920)

Synonyms
- Limnoecia trixantha Lower, 1920

Species of moth

Limnaecia trixantha is a moth in the family Cosmopterigidae. It is found in Australia, where it has been recorded from Queensland.
