= Limnaecia chloronephes =

Scientific classification
- Kingdom: Animalia
- Phylum: Arthropoda
- Clade: Pancrustacea
- Class: Insecta
- Order: Lepidoptera
- Family: Cosmopterigidae
- Genus: Limnaecia
- Species: L. chloronephes

Binomial name
- Limnaecia chloronephes Meyrick, 1924

Synonyms
- Limnoecia chloronephes Meyrick, 1924

Species of moth

Limnaecia chloronephes is a moth in the family Cosmopterigidae. It is found in Zimbabwe.
