= Limnaecia clinodesma =

Scientific classification
- Kingdom: Animalia
- Phylum: Arthropoda
- Clade: Pancrustacea
- Class: Insecta
- Order: Lepidoptera
- Family: Cosmopterigidae
- Genus: Limnaecia
- Species: L. clinodesma

Binomial name
- Limnaecia clinodesma (Meyrick, 1932)

Synonyms
- Limnoecia clinodesma Meyrick, 1932

Species of moth

Limnaecia clinodesma is a moth in the family Cosmopterigidae. It is found on Java.
