= Limnaecia pycnosaris =

Scientific classification
- Kingdom: Animalia
- Phylum: Arthropoda
- Clade: Pancrustacea
- Class: Insecta
- Order: Lepidoptera
- Family: Cosmopterigidae
- Genus: Limnaecia
- Species: L. pycnosaris

Binomial name
- Limnaecia pycnosaris (Meyrick, 1938)

Synonyms
- Limnoecia pycnosaris Meyrick, 1938

Species of moth

Limnaecia pycnosaris is a moth in the family Cosmopterigidae. It is found in New Guinea.
