= Limnaecia triplaneta =

Scientific classification
- Kingdom: Animalia
- Phylum: Arthropoda
- Clade: Pancrustacea
- Class: Insecta
- Order: Lepidoptera
- Family: Cosmopterigidae
- Genus: Limnaecia
- Species: L. triplaneta

Binomial name
- Limnaecia triplaneta Meyrick, 1921

Synonyms
- Limnoecia triplaneta Meyrick, 1921

Species of moth

Limnaecia triplaneta is a moth of the family Cosmopterigidae. It is known from Australia.
