= Limnaecia mercuriella =

Scientific classification
- Kingdom: Animalia
- Phylum: Arthropoda
- Clade: Pancrustacea
- Class: Insecta
- Order: Lepidoptera
- Family: Cosmopterigidae
- Genus: Limnaecia
- Species: L. mercuriella

Binomial name
- Limnaecia mercuriella (Walker, 1864)

Synonyms
- Limnoecia mercuriella Walker, 1864; Gelechia mercuriella Walker, 1864

Species of moth

Limnaecia mercuriella is a moth in the family Cosmopterigidae. It is found on Borneo.
