= Limnaecia microglypta =

Scientific classification
- Kingdom: Animalia
- Phylum: Arthropoda
- Clade: Pancrustacea
- Class: Insecta
- Order: Lepidoptera
- Family: Cosmopterigidae
- Genus: Limnaecia
- Species: L. microglypta

Binomial name
- Limnaecia microglypta (Meyrick, 1928)

Synonyms
- Limnoecia microglypta Meyrick, 1928

Species of moth

Limnaecia microglypta is a moth in the family Cosmopterigidae. It is found on the New Hebrides.
