= Limnaecia anisodesma =

Scientific classification
- Kingdom: Animalia
- Phylum: Arthropoda
- Clade: Pancrustacea
- Class: Insecta
- Order: Lepidoptera
- Family: Cosmopterigidae
- Genus: Limnaecia
- Species: L. anisodesma

Binomial name
- Limnaecia anisodesma Lower, 1904

Synonyms
- Limnoecia anisodesma Lower, 1904

Species of moth

Limnaecia anisodesma is a moth of the family Cosmopterigidae. It is known from Australia.
