= Limnaecia ancilla =

Scientific classification
- Kingdom: Animalia
- Phylum: Arthropoda
- Clade: Pancrustacea
- Class: Insecta
- Order: Lepidoptera
- Family: Cosmopterigidae
- Genus: Limnaecia
- Species: L. ancilla

Binomial name
- Limnaecia ancilla (Meyrick, 1934)

Synonyms
- Limnoecia ancilla Meyrick, 1934

Species of moth

Limnaecia ancilla is a moth in the family Cosmopterigidae. It is found on Java.
