= Limnaecia leptozona =

Scientific classification
- Kingdom: Animalia
- Phylum: Arthropoda
- Clade: Pancrustacea
- Class: Insecta
- Order: Lepidoptera
- Family: Cosmopterigidae
- Genus: Limnaecia
- Species: L. leptozona

Binomial name
- Limnaecia leptozona Turner, 1923

Synonyms
- Limnoecia leptozona Turner, 1923

Species of moth

Limnaecia leptozona is a moth of the family Cosmopterigidae. It is known from Australia.
