= Limnaecia tetramitra =

Scientific classification
- Kingdom: Animalia
- Phylum: Arthropoda
- Clade: Pancrustacea
- Class: Insecta
- Order: Lepidoptera
- Family: Cosmopterigidae
- Genus: Limnaecia
- Species: L. tetramitra

Binomial name
- Limnaecia tetramitra (Meyrick, 1931)

Synonyms
- Limnoecia tetramitra Meyrick, 1931

Species of moth

Limnaecia tetramitra is a moth in the family Cosmopterigidae. It is found in Burma.
