= Limnaecia xylinella =

Scientific classification
- Kingdom: Animalia
- Phylum: Arthropoda
- Clade: Pancrustacea
- Class: Insecta
- Order: Lepidoptera
- Family: Cosmopterigidae
- Genus: Limnaecia
- Species: L. xylinella

Binomial name
- Limnaecia xylinella (Snellen, 1901)

Synonyms
- Limnoecia xylinella Snellen, 1901

Species of moth

Limnaecia xylinella is a moth in the family Cosmopterigidae. It is found on Java.
