= Limnaecia eristica =

Scientific classification
- Kingdom: Animalia
- Phylum: Arthropoda
- Clade: Pancrustacea
- Class: Insecta
- Order: Lepidoptera
- Family: Cosmopterigidae
- Genus: Limnaecia
- Species: L. eristica

Binomial name
- Limnaecia eristica Meyrick, 1919

Synonyms
- Limnoecia eristica Meyrick, 1919

Species of moth

Limnaecia eristica is a moth of the family Cosmopterigidae. It is known from Australia.
