= Limnaecia audax =

Scientific classification
- Kingdom: Animalia
- Phylum: Arthropoda
- Clade: Pancrustacea
- Class: Insecta
- Order: Lepidoptera
- Family: Cosmopterigidae
- Genus: Limnaecia
- Species: L. audax

Binomial name
- Limnaecia audax (Meyrick, 1914)

Synonyms
- Erechthiodes audax Meyrick, 1914

Species of moth

Limnaecia audax is a moth in the family Cosmopterigidae. It is found in South Africa.
