= Limnaecia phaeopleura =

Scientific classification
- Kingdom: Animalia
- Phylum: Arthropoda
- Clade: Pancrustacea
- Class: Insecta
- Order: Lepidoptera
- Family: Cosmopterigidae
- Genus: Limnaecia
- Species: L. phaeopleura

Binomial name
- Limnaecia phaeopleura (Meyrick, 1924)

Synonyms
- Limnoecia phaeopleura Meyrick, 1924

Species of moth

Limnaecia phaeopleura is a moth in the family Cosmopterigidae. It is found on Fiji.
