= Limnaecia chromaturga =

Scientific classification
- Kingdom: Animalia
- Phylum: Arthropoda
- Clade: Pancrustacea
- Class: Insecta
- Order: Lepidoptera
- Family: Cosmopterigidae
- Genus: Limnaecia
- Species: L. chromaturga

Binomial name
- Limnaecia chromaturga (Meyrick, 1915)

Synonyms
- Xestocasis chromaturga Meyrick, 1915; Callixestis chromaturga; Limnoecia chromaturga

Species of moth

Limnaecia chromaturga is a moth in the family Cosmopterigidae. It was described by Edward Meyrick in 1915. It is found in Sri Lanka.
