= Limnaecia platychlora =

Scientific classification
- Kingdom: Animalia
- Phylum: Arthropoda
- Clade: Pancrustacea
- Class: Insecta
- Order: Lepidoptera
- Family: Cosmopterigidae
- Genus: Limnaecia
- Species: L. platychlora

Binomial name
- Limnaecia platychlora Meyrick, 1915

Synonyms
- Limnoecia platychlora Meyrick, 1915

Species of moth

Limnaecia platychlora is a moth of the family Cosmopterigidae. It is known from Australia.
