= Limnaecia cirrhochrosta =

Scientific classification
- Kingdom: Animalia
- Phylum: Arthropoda
- Clade: Pancrustacea
- Class: Insecta
- Order: Lepidoptera
- Family: Cosmopterigidae
- Genus: Limnaecia
- Species: L. cirrhochrosta

Binomial name
- Limnaecia cirrhochrosta (Meyrick, 1933)

Synonyms
- Limnoecia cirrhochrosta Meyrick, 1933

Species of moth

Limnaecia cirrhochrosta is a moth in the family Cosmopterigidae. It is found on Fiji.
