= Limnaecia eumeristis =

Scientific classification
- Kingdom: Animalia
- Phylum: Arthropoda
- Clade: Pancrustacea
- Class: Insecta
- Order: Lepidoptera
- Family: Cosmopterigidae
- Genus: Limnaecia
- Species: L. eumeristis

Binomial name
- Limnaecia eumeristis (Meyrick, 1927)

Synonyms
- Limnoecia eumeristis Meyrick, 1927

Species of moth

Limnaecia eumeristis is a moth in the family Cosmopterigidae. It is found on Samoa.
