= Limnaecia arsitricha =

Scientific classification
- Kingdom: Animalia
- Phylum: Arthropoda
- Clade: Pancrustacea
- Class: Insecta
- Order: Lepidoptera
- Family: Cosmopterigidae
- Genus: Limnaecia
- Species: L. arsitricha

Binomial name
- Limnaecia arsitricha (Meyrick, 1927)

Synonyms
- Limnoecia arsitricha Meyrick, 1927

Species of moth

Limnaecia arsitricha is a moth in the family Cosmopterigidae, which lives in Samoa.
