= Limnaecia eretmota =

Scientific classification
- Kingdom: Animalia
- Phylum: Arthropoda
- Clade: Pancrustacea
- Class: Insecta
- Order: Lepidoptera
- Family: Cosmopterigidae
- Genus: Limnaecia
- Species: L. eretmota

Binomial name
- Limnaecia eretmota Meyrick, 1909

Synonyms
- Limnoecia eretmota Meyrick, 1909

Species of moth

Limnaecia eretmota is a moth in the family Cosmopterigidae. It is found in South Africa.
