= Limnaecia cuprella =

Scientific classification
- Domain: Eukaryota
- Kingdom: Animalia
- Phylum: Arthropoda
- Class: Insecta
- Order: Lepidoptera
- Family: Cosmopterigidae
- Genus: Limnaecia
- Species: L. cuprella

Binomial name
- Limnaecia cuprella (Rebel, 1934)

Synonyms
- Anybia cuprella Rebel, 1934

Extinct species of moth

Limnaecia cuprella is an extinct species of moth in the family Cosmopterigidae. It was described from Baltic amber.
