= Limnaecia melliplanta =

Scientific classification
- Kingdom: Animalia
- Phylum: Arthropoda
- Clade: Pancrustacea
- Class: Insecta
- Order: Lepidoptera
- Family: Cosmopterigidae
- Genus: Limnaecia
- Species: L. melliplanta

Binomial name
- Limnaecia melliplanta Bradley, 1957

Species of moth

Limnaecia melliplanta is a moth in the family Cosmopterigidae. It is found on Rennell Island.
