= Limnaecia orthochroa =

Scientific classification
- Kingdom: Animalia
- Phylum: Arthropoda
- Clade: Pancrustacea
- Class: Insecta
- Order: Lepidoptera
- Family: Cosmopterigidae
- Genus: Limnaecia
- Species: L. orthochroa

Binomial name
- Limnaecia orthochroa (Lower, 1899)

Synonyms
- Aeoloscelis orthochroa Lower, 1899

Species of moth

Limnaecia orthochroa is a moth of the family Cosmopterigidae. It is known from Australia.
