= Limnaecia crocodelta =

Scientific classification
- Kingdom: Animalia
- Phylum: Arthropoda
- Clade: Pancrustacea
- Class: Insecta
- Order: Lepidoptera
- Family: Cosmopterigidae
- Genus: Limnaecia
- Species: L. crocodelta

Binomial name
- Limnaecia crocodelta (Meyrick, 1915)

Synonyms
- Xestocasis crocodelta Meyrick, 1915

Species of moth

Limnaecia crocodelta is a moth in the family Cosmopterigidae. It is found in India.
