= Limnaecia zonomacula =

Scientific classification
- Kingdom: Animalia
- Phylum: Arthropoda
- Clade: Pancrustacea
- Class: Insecta
- Order: Lepidoptera
- Family: Cosmopterigidae
- Genus: Limnaecia
- Species: L. zonomacula

Binomial name
- Limnaecia zonomacula Lower, 1908

Synonyms
- Limnoecia zonomacula Lower, 1908

Species of moth

Limnaecia zonomacula is a moth of the family Cosmopterigidae. It is known from Australia.
