= Limnaecia crossomela =

Scientific classification
- Kingdom: Animalia
- Phylum: Arthropoda
- Clade: Pancrustacea
- Class: Insecta
- Order: Lepidoptera
- Family: Cosmopterigidae
- Genus: Limnaecia
- Species: L. crossomela

Binomial name
- Limnaecia crossomela Lower, 1908

Synonyms
- Limnoecia crossomela Lower, 1908

Species of moth

Limnaecia crossomela is a moth of the family Cosmopterigidae. It is known from Australia.
