= Limnaecia zotica =

Scientific classification
- Kingdom: Animalia
- Phylum: Arthropoda
- Clade: Pancrustacea
- Class: Insecta
- Order: Lepidoptera
- Family: Cosmopterigidae
- Genus: Limnaecia
- Species: L. zotica

Binomial name
- Limnaecia zotica Meyrick, 1921

Synonyms
- Limnoecia zotica Meyrick, 1921

Species of moth

Limnaecia zotica is a moth of the family Cosmopterigidae. It is known from Australia.
