= Limnaecia cirrhozona =

Scientific classification
- Kingdom: Animalia
- Phylum: Arthropoda
- Clade: Pancrustacea
- Class: Insecta
- Order: Lepidoptera
- Family: Cosmopterigidae
- Genus: Limnaecia
- Species: L. cirrhozona

Binomial name
- Limnaecia cirrhozona Turner, 1923

Synonyms
- Limnoecia cirrhozona Turner, 1923

Species of moth

Limnaecia cirrhozona is a moth of the family Cosmopterigidae. It is known from Australia.

Adults have blackish forewings and transverse white or orange markings.
