= Limnaecia melileuca =

Scientific classification
- Kingdom: Animalia
- Phylum: Arthropoda
- Clade: Pancrustacea
- Class: Insecta
- Order: Lepidoptera
- Family: Cosmopterigidae
- Genus: Limnaecia
- Species: L. melileuca

Binomial name
- Limnaecia melileuca (Meyrick, 1937)

Synonyms
- Limnoecia melileuca Meyrick, 1937

Species of moth

Limnaecia melileuca is a moth in the family Cosmopterigidae. It is found in India.
