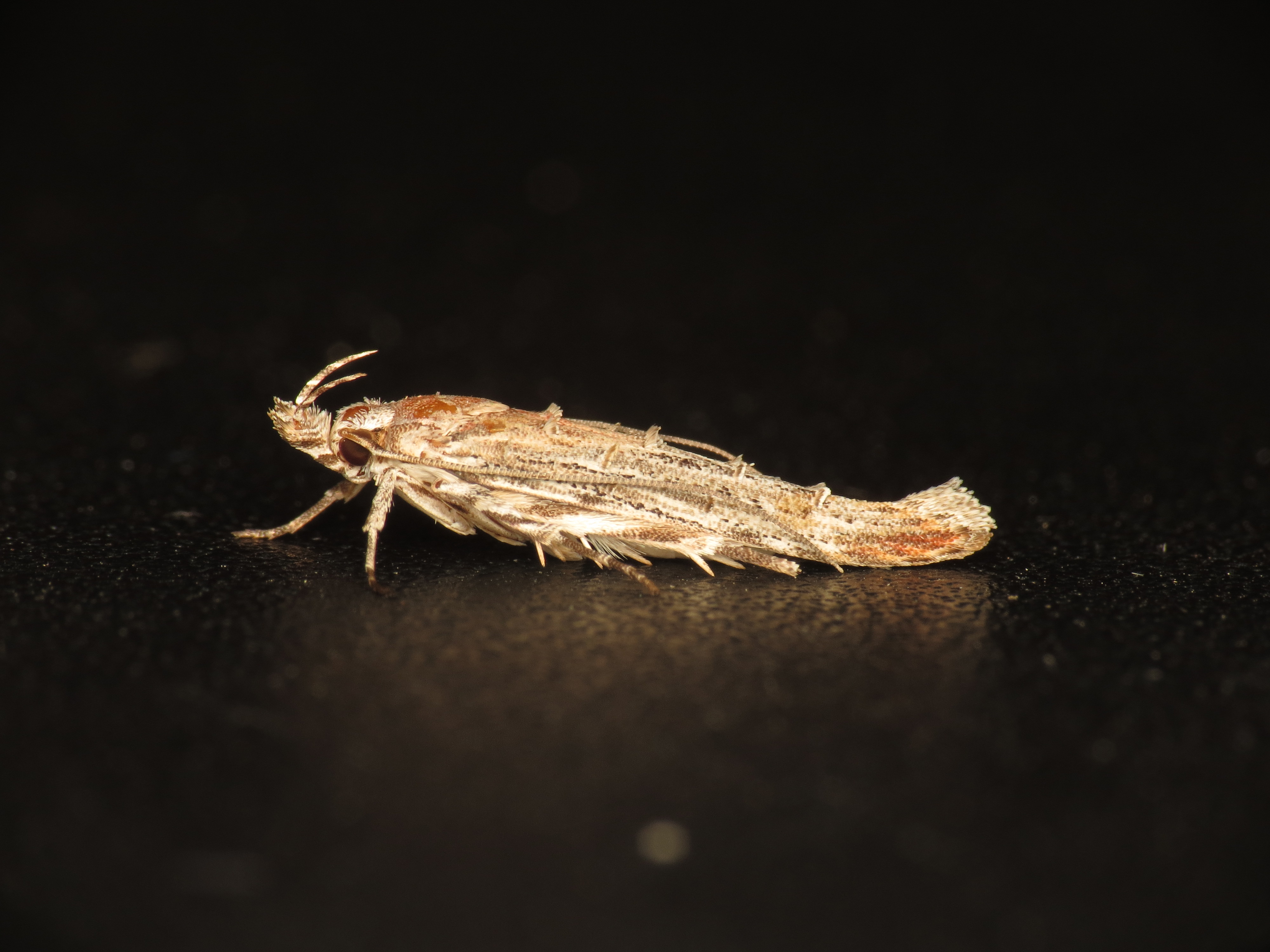
- Leptozestis sp.

Scientific classification
- Kingdom: Animalia
- Phylum: Arthropoda
- Class: Insecta
- Order: Lepidoptera
- Family: Cosmopterigidae
- Subfamily: Cosmopteriginae
- Genus: Leptozestis; Meyrick, 1924

Synonyms
- Pogonias Lower, 1893 (preocc. Lacepéde, 1802)

= Leptozestis =

Genus of moths

Leptozestis is a genus of moths in the family Elachistidae.

== Species ==
- Leptozestis anagrapta (Meyrick, 1897)
- Leptozestis antithetis (Meyrick, 1897)
- Leptozestis argoscia (Lower, 1904)
- Leptozestis autochroa (Meyrick, 1915)
- Leptozestis capnopora (Meyrick, 1897)
- Leptozestis cataspoda (Meyrick, 1897)
- Leptozestis charmosyna (Meyrick, 1921)
- Leptozestis chionomera
- Leptozestis crassipalpis (Turner, 1923)
- Leptozestis crebra (Meyrick, 1906)
- Leptozestis cyclonia (Meyrick, 1897)
- Leptozestis decalopha (Lower, 1904)
- Leptozestis ecstatica (Meyrick, 1897)
- Leptozestis epiphrixa (Meyrick, 1897)
- Leptozestis epochaea
- Leptozestis euryplaca (Lower, 1893)
- Leptozestis eximia (Meyrick, 1897)
- Leptozestis gnophodes (Lower, 1904)
- Leptozestis harmosta (Meyrick, 1897)
- Leptozestis hestiopa (Meyrick, 1897)
- Leptozestis melamydra
- Leptozestis melanopa (Meyrick, 1897)
- Leptozestis ochlopa (Meyrick, 1897)
- Leptozestis oxyptera
- Leptozestis parasica (Meyrick, 1897)
- Leptozestis perinephes
- Leptozestis phylactis (Meyrick, 1897) (misspelling Leptozestis plylactis)
- Leptozestis polychroa
- Leptozestis psarotricha (Meyrick, 1897)
- Leptozestis psoralea (Meyrick, 1897)
- Leptozestis sedula (Meyrick, 1897)
- Leptozestis spodoptera (Turner, 1923)
- Leptozestis strophicodes (Meyrick, 1917)
- Leptozestis tephras (Meyrick, 1897)
- Leptozestis toreutica (Meyrick, 1897)
- Leptozestis tropaea (Meyrick, 1897)
- Leptozestis valida (Meyrick, 1919)

== Former species ==
- Leptozestis acrocyrta
- Leptozestis acromianta
- Leptozestis chalcoptila (Meyrick, 1922)
- Leptozestis fumea
- Leptozestis macrostola
- Leptozestis pygaea
- Leptozestis tephronota
- Leptozestis xenonympha
