= Leptozestis cataspoda =

Scientific classification
- Kingdom: Animalia
- Phylum: Arthropoda
- Class: Insecta
- Order: Lepidoptera
- Family: Cosmopterigidae
- Genus: Leptozestis
- Species: L. cataspoda

Binomial name
- Leptozestis cataspoda (Meyrick, 1897)

Synonyms
- Syntomactis cataspoda Meyrick, 1897

Species of moth

Leptozestis cataspoda is a moth in the family Cosmopterigidae. It was described by Edward Meyrick in 1897. It is found in Australia, where it has been recorded from South Australia.
