= Leptozestis euryplaca =

Scientific classification
- Domain: Eukaryota
- Kingdom: Animalia
- Phylum: Arthropoda
- Class: Insecta
- Order: Lepidoptera
- Family: Cosmopterigidae
- Genus: Leptozestis
- Species: L. euryplaca

Binomial name
- Leptozestis euryplaca (Lower, 1893)

Synonyms
- Pogonias euryplaca Lower, 1893; Syntomactis selenura Meyrick, 1897

Species of moth

Leptozestis euryplaca is a moth in the family Cosmopterigidae. It was described by Oswald Bertram Lower in 1893. It is found in Australia, where it has been recorded from South Australia and Queensland.
