= Leptozestis antithetis =

Scientific classification
- Kingdom: Animalia
- Phylum: Arthropoda
- Class: Insecta
- Order: Lepidoptera
- Family: Cosmopterigidae
- Genus: Leptozestis
- Species: L. antithetis

Binomial name
- Leptozestis antithetis (Meyrick, 1897)

Synonyms
- Syntomactis antithetis Meyrick, 1897

Species of moth

Leptozestis antithetis is a moth in the family Cosmopterigidae, first described by Edward Meyrick in 1897. It is found in Australia, with recorded occurrences in South Australia.
