= Trachydora peroneta =

Scientific classification
- Kingdom: Animalia
- Phylum: Arthropoda
- Class: Insecta
- Order: Lepidoptera
- Family: Cosmopterigidae
- Genus: Trachydora
- Species: T. peroneta

Binomial name
- Trachydora peroneta Meyrick, 1897

Species of moth

Trachydora peroneta is a species of moth in the family Elachistidae. It is found in Australia, where it has been recorded from Queensland.
