= Leptozestis epochaea =

Scientific classification
- Kingdom: Animalia
- Phylum: Arthropoda
- Class: Insecta
- Order: Lepidoptera
- Family: Cosmopterigidae
- Genus: Leptozestis
- Species: L. epochaea

Binomial name
- Leptozestis epochaea (Meyrick, 1917)

Synonyms
- Syntomactis epochaea Meyrick, 1917

Species of moth

Leptozestis epochaea is a moth in the family Cosmopterigidae. It is found in India.
