= Leptozestis valida =

Scientific classification
- Kingdom: Animalia
- Phylum: Arthropoda
- Class: Insecta
- Order: Lepidoptera
- Family: Cosmopterigidae
- Genus: Leptozestis
- Species: L. valida

Binomial name
- Leptozestis valida (Meyrick, 1919)

Synonyms
- Syntomactis valida Meyrick, 1919

Species of moth

Leptozestis valida is a moth in the family Cosmopterigidae. It was described by Edward Meyrick in 1919. It is found in Australia, where it has been recorded from Queensland.
