= Trachydora illustris =

Scientific classification
- Kingdom: Animalia
- Phylum: Arthropoda
- Class: Insecta
- Order: Lepidoptera
- Family: Cosmopterigidae
- Genus: Trachydora
- Species: T. illustris

Binomial name
- Trachydora illustris Meyrick, 1897

Species of moth

Trachydora illustris is a moth in the family Cosmopterigidae. It is found in Australia, where it has been recorded from New South Wales.
