= Leptozestis crebra =

Scientific classification
- Kingdom: Animalia
- Phylum: Arthropoda
- Class: Insecta
- Order: Lepidoptera
- Family: Cosmopterigidae
- Genus: Leptozestis
- Species: L. crebra

Binomial name
- Leptozestis crebra (Meyrick, 1906)

Synonyms
- Syntomactis crebra Meyrick, 1906

Species of moth

Leptozestis crebra is a moth in the family Cosmopterigidae. It was described by Edward Meyrick in 1906. It is found in Australia, where it has been recorded from New South Wales.
