= Leptozestis strophicodes =

Scientific classification
- Kingdom: Animalia
- Phylum: Arthropoda
- Class: Insecta
- Order: Lepidoptera
- Family: Cosmopterigidae
- Genus: Leptozestis
- Species: L. strophicodes

Binomial name
- Leptozestis strophicodes (Meyrick, 1917)

Synonyms
- Syntomactis strophicodes Meyrick, 1917

Species of moth

Leptozestis strophicodes is a moth in the family Cosmopterigidae. It was described by Edward Meyrick in 1917. It is found in Australia, where it has been recorded from Queensland.
