= Leptozestis oxyptera =

Scientific classification
- Domain: Eukaryota
- Kingdom: Animalia
- Phylum: Arthropoda
- Class: Insecta
- Order: Lepidoptera
- Family: Cosmopterigidae
- Genus: Leptozestis
- Species: L. oxyptera

Binomial name
- Leptozestis oxyptera (Lower, 1900)

Synonyms
- Syntomactis oxyptera Lower, 1900

Species of moth

Leptozestis oxyptera is a moth in the family Cosmopterigidae described by Oswald Bertram Lower in 1900. It is found in Australia, where it has been recorded from New South Wales.

The wingspan is 8–10 mm. The forewings are ashy-grey whitish with a fuscous spot on the inner margin before middle, edged anteriorly by a whitish streak. There is a black spot above the anal angle, and two or three along the costa towards the apex. The hindwings are greyish, but ochreous tinged at the base.
