= Leptozestis charmosyna =

Scientific classification
- Kingdom: Animalia
- Phylum: Arthropoda
- Class: Insecta
- Order: Lepidoptera
- Family: Cosmopterigidae
- Genus: Leptozestis
- Species: L. charmosyna

Binomial name
- Leptozestis charmosyna (Meyrick, 1921)

Synonyms
- Syntomactis charmosyna Meyrick, 1921

Species of moth

Leptozestis charmosyna is a moth in the family Cosmopterigidae. It was described by Edward Meyrick in 1921. It is found in Australia, where it has been recorded from South Australia.
