= Trachydora dionysias =

Scientific classification
- Kingdom: Animalia
- Phylum: Arthropoda
- Class: Insecta
- Order: Lepidoptera
- Family: Cosmopterigidae
- Genus: Trachydora
- Species: T. dionysias

Binomial name
- Trachydora dionysias Meyrick, 1921

Species of moth

Trachydora dionysias is a moth in the family Cosmopterigidae. It is found in Australia, where it has been recorded from South Australia.
