= Trachydora chalybanthes =

Scientific classification
- Kingdom: Animalia
- Phylum: Arthropoda
- Class: Insecta
- Order: Lepidoptera
- Family: Cosmopterigidae
- Genus: Trachydora
- Species: T. chalybanthes

Binomial name
- Trachydora chalybanthes Meyrick, 1897

Species of moth

Trachydora chalybanthes is a moth in the family Cosmopterigidae. It is found in Australia, where it has been recorded from New South Wales.
