= Trachydora porphyrescens =

Scientific classification
- Domain: Eukaryota
- Kingdom: Animalia
- Phylum: Arthropoda
- Class: Insecta
- Order: Lepidoptera
- Family: Cosmopterigidae
- Genus: Trachydora
- Species: T. porphyrescens

Binomial name
- Trachydora porphyrescens (Lower, 1894)

Synonyms
- Pogonias porphyrescens Lower, 1894

Species of moth

Trachydora porphyrescens is a moth in the family Cosmopterigidae. It is found in Australia, where it has been recorded from South Australia.
