= Leptozestis sedula =

Scientific classification
- Kingdom: Animalia
- Phylum: Arthropoda
- Class: Insecta
- Order: Lepidoptera
- Family: Cosmopterigidae
- Genus: Leptozestis
- Species: L. sedula

Binomial name
- Leptozestis sedula (Meyrick, 1897)

Synonyms
- Syntomactis sedula Meyrick, 1897

Species of moth

Leptozestis sedula is a moth in the family Cosmopterigidae. It was described by Edward Meyrick in 1897. It is found in Australia, where it has been recorded from New South Wales.
