= Leptozestis capnopora =

Scientific classification
- Kingdom: Animalia
- Phylum: Arthropoda
- Class: Insecta
- Order: Lepidoptera
- Family: Cosmopterigidae
- Genus: Leptozestis
- Species: L. capnopora

Binomial name
- Leptozestis capnopora (Meyrick, 1897)

Synonyms
- Syntomactis capnopora Meyrick, 1897

Species of moth

Leptozestis capnopora is a moth in the family Cosmopterigidae. It was described by Edward Meyrick in 1897. It is found in Australia, where it has been recorded from New South Wales.
