= Trachydora capnopa =

Scientific classification
- Domain: Eukaryota
- Kingdom: Animalia
- Phylum: Arthropoda
- Class: Insecta
- Order: Lepidoptera
- Family: Cosmopterigidae
- Genus: Trachydora
- Species: T. capnopa

Binomial name
- Trachydora capnopa (Lower, 1894)

Synonyms
- Pogonias capnopa Lower, 1894

Species of moth

Trachydora capnopa is a moth in the family Cosmopterigidae. It is found in Australia, where it has been recorded from Victoria.
