= Leptozestis autochroa =

Scientific classification
- Kingdom: Animalia
- Phylum: Arthropoda
- Class: Insecta
- Order: Lepidoptera
- Family: Cosmopterigidae
- Genus: Leptozestis
- Species: L. autochroa

Binomial name
- Leptozestis autochroa (Meyrick, 1915)

Synonyms
- Syntomactis autochroa Meyrick, 1915

Species of moth

Leptozestis autochroa is a moth in the family Cosmopterigidae. It was described by Edward Meyrick in 1915. It is found in Australia, where it has been recorded from Victoria.
