= Leptozestis eximia =

Scientific classification
- Kingdom: Animalia
- Phylum: Arthropoda
- Class: Insecta
- Order: Lepidoptera
- Family: Cosmopterigidae
- Genus: Leptozestis
- Species: L. eximia

Binomial name
- Leptozestis eximia (Meyrick, 1897)

Synonyms
- Syntomactis eximia Meyrick, 1897

Species of moth

Leptozestis eximia is a moth in the family Cosmopterigidae. It was described by Edward Meyrick in 1897. It is found in Australia, where it has been recorded from Western Australia.
