= Trachydora heliodora =

Scientific classification
- Domain: Eukaryota
- Kingdom: Animalia
- Phylum: Arthropoda
- Class: Insecta
- Order: Lepidoptera
- Family: Cosmopterigidae
- Genus: Trachydora
- Species: T. heliodora

Binomial name
- Trachydora heliodora (Lower, 1894)

Synonyms
- Pogonias heliodora Lower, 1894

Species of moth

Trachydora heliodora is a moth in the family Cosmopterigidae. It is found in Australia, where it has been recorded from Queensland.
