= Trachydora oxypeuces =

Scientific classification
- Domain: Eukaryota
- Kingdom: Animalia
- Phylum: Arthropoda
- Class: Insecta
- Order: Lepidoptera
- Family: Cosmopterigidae
- Genus: Trachydora
- Species: T. oxypeuces

Binomial name
- Trachydora oxypeuces Turner, 1939

Species of moth

Trachydora oxypeuces is a moth in the family Cosmopterigidae. It is found in Australia, where it has been recorded from Tasmania.
