= Trachydora droserodes =

Scientific classification
- Kingdom: Animalia
- Phylum: Arthropoda
- Clade: Pancrustacea
- Class: Insecta
- Order: Lepidoptera
- Family: Cosmopterigidae
- Genus: Trachydora
- Species: T. droserodes

Binomial name
- Trachydora droserodes Meyrick, 1897

Species of moth

Trachydora droserodes is a moth in the family Cosmopterigidae. The species was first discovered by English entomologist Edward Meyrick in 1897. It is found in Australia, where it has been recorded from New South Wales.
