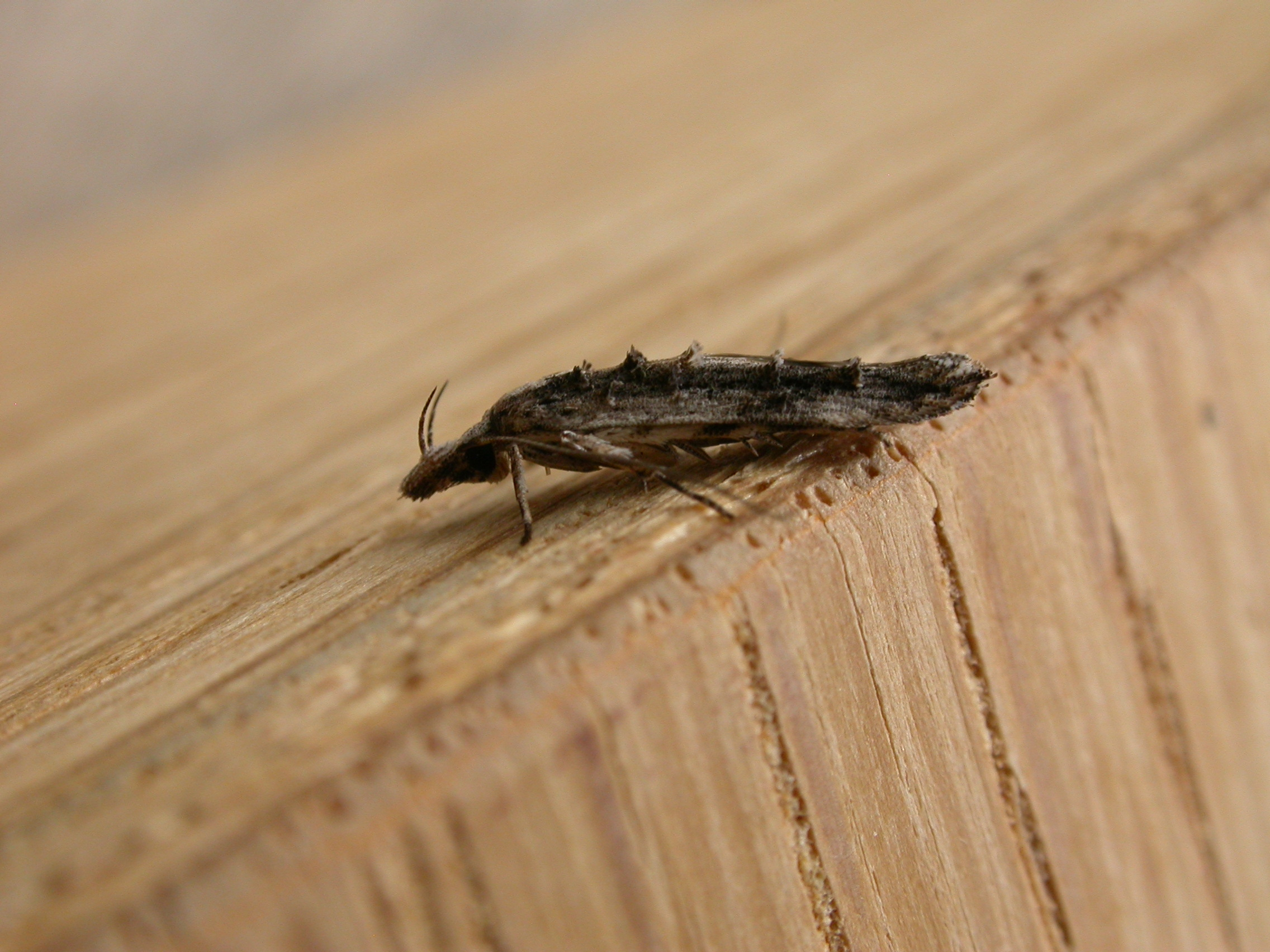
- Trachydora musaea

Scientific classification
- Kingdom: Animalia
- Phylum: Arthropoda
- Class: Insecta
- Order: Lepidoptera
- Family: Cosmopterigidae
- Genus: Trachydora; Meyrick, 1897

Synonyms
- Anataractis Meyrick, 1916; Pogonias Lower, 1893

= Trachydora =

Genus of moths

Trachydora is a genus of moths in the family Cosmopterigidae.

== Species ==
- Trachydora acrocyrta (Turner, 1923)
- Trachydora acromianta (Turner, 1923)
- Trachydora actinia Meyrick, 1897
- Trachydora anthrascopa Lower, 1904
- Trachydora aphrocoma Meyrick, 1897
- Trachydora argoneura Lower, 1904
- Trachydora astragalota Meyrick, 1897
- Trachydora capnopa (Lower, 1894)
- Trachydora centromela Lower, 1904
- Trachydora chalybanthes Meyrick, 1897
- Trachydora chlorozona Meyrick, 1897
- Trachydora chrysodoxa Meyrick, 1915
- Trachydora corysta Meyrick, 1897
- Trachydora dionysias Meyrick, 1921
- Trachydora droserodes Meyrick, 1897
- Trachydora fumea (Turner, 1923)
- Trachydora heliodora (Lower, 1894)
- Trachydora heliotricha (Lower, 1894)
- Trachydora illustris Meyrick, 1897
- Trachydora iridoptila Meyrick, 1921
- Trachydora leucobathra Lower, 1904
- Trachydora leucura Meyrick, 1897
- Trachydora macrostola (Turner, 1923)
- Trachydora microleuca Lower, 1904
- Trachydora molybdimera Lower, 1904
- Trachydora musaea Meyrick, 1897
- Trachydora nomodoxa Meyrick, 1897
- Trachydora oxypeuces Turner, 1939
- Trachydora oxyzona Meyrick, 1897
- Trachydora peroneta Meyrick, 1897
- Trachydora placophanes Meyrick, 1897
- Trachydora polyzona Lower, 1904
- Trachydora porphyrescens (Lower, 1894)
- Trachydora psammodes Meyrick, 1897
- Trachydora pygaea (Turner, 1923)
- Trachydora stephanopa Meyrick, 1897
- Trachydora tephronota (Turner, 1923)
- Trachydora thyrsophora Meyrick, 1897
- Trachydora zophopepla Lower, 1904
