= Trachydora iridoptila =

Scientific classification
- Kingdom: Animalia
- Phylum: Arthropoda
- Class: Insecta
- Order: Lepidoptera
- Family: Cosmopterigidae
- Genus: Trachydora
- Species: T. iridoptila

Binomial name
- Trachydora iridoptila Meyrick, 1921

Species of moth

Trachydora iridoptila is a moth in the family Cosmopterigidae. It is found in Australia, where it has been recorded from Queensland.
