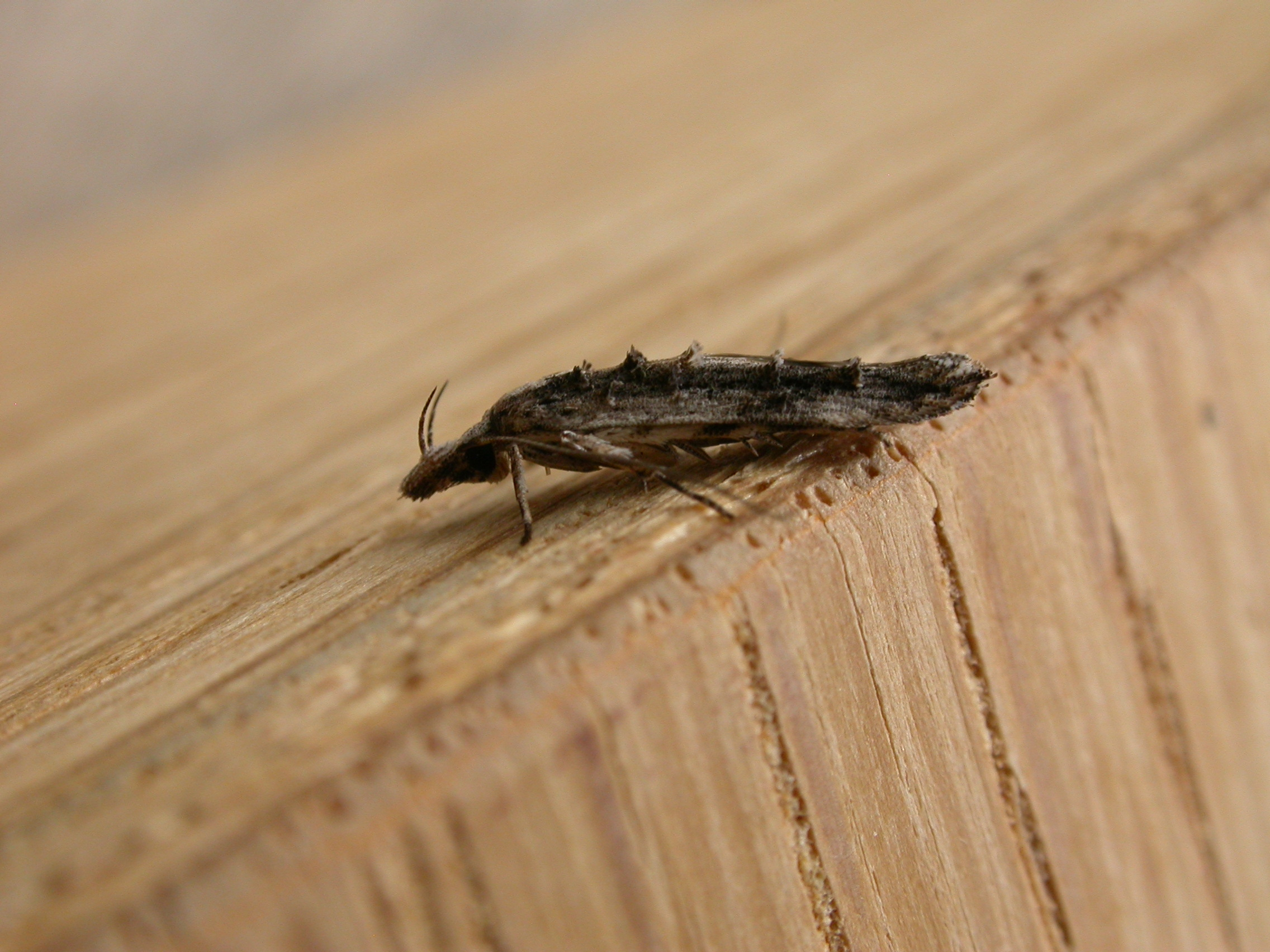

Scientific classification
- Kingdom: Animalia
- Phylum: Arthropoda
- Class: Insecta
- Order: Lepidoptera
- Family: Cosmopterigidae
- Genus: Trachydora
- Species: T. musaea

Binomial name
- Trachydora musaea Meyrick, 1897

= Trachydora musaea =

Species of moth

Trachydora musaea is a species of moth of the family Cosmopterigidae. It is found in Australia.
