= Trachydora leucobathra =

Scientific classification
- Domain: Eukaryota
- Kingdom: Animalia
- Phylum: Arthropoda
- Class: Insecta
- Order: Lepidoptera
- Family: Cosmopterigidae
- Genus: Trachydora
- Species: T. leucobathra

Binomial name
- Trachydora leucobathra Lower, 1904

Species of moth

Trachydora leucobathra is a moth in the family Cosmopterigidae. It is found in Australia, where it has been recorded from Queensland.
