= Leptozestis chionomera =

Scientific classification
- Domain: Eukaryota
- Kingdom: Animalia
- Phylum: Arthropoda
- Class: Insecta
- Order: Lepidoptera
- Family: Cosmopterigidae
- Genus: Leptozestis
- Species: L. chionomera

Binomial name
- Leptozestis chionomera (Lower, 1900)

Synonyms
- Syntomactis chionomera Lower, 1900

Species of moth

Leptozestis chionomera is a moth in the family Cosmopterigidae described by Oswald Bertram Lower in 1900. It is found in Australia, where it has been recorded from New South Wales.

The wingspan is 8–10 mm. The forewings are dull whitish with some scattered black scales below the middle. The hindwings are whitish.
