= Leptozestis melamydra =

Scientific classification
- Domain: Eukaryota
- Kingdom: Animalia
- Phylum: Arthropoda
- Class: Insecta
- Order: Lepidoptera
- Family: Cosmopterigidae
- Genus: Leptozestis
- Species: L. melamydra

Binomial name
- Leptozestis melamydra (Lower, 1904)

Synonyms
- Syntomactis melamydra Lower, 1904

Species of moth

Leptozestis melamydra is a moth in the family Cosmopterigidae. It is found in Australia, where it has been recorded from Victoria.
