= Scythris xenonympha =

Scientific classification
- Kingdom: Animalia
- Phylum: Arthropoda
- Class: Insecta
- Order: Lepidoptera
- Family: Scythrididae
- Genus: Scythris
- Species: S. xenonympha

Binomial name
- Scythris xenonympha (Lower, 1900)

Synonyms
- Syntomactis xenonympha Lower, 1900

Species of moth

Scythris xenonympha is a moth in the family Scythrididae. It is found in Australia, where it has been recorded from New South Wales.

The wingspan is 8–10 mm. The forewings are white, finely dusted with fuscous and with three fuscous dots. The hindwings are pale fuscous.
