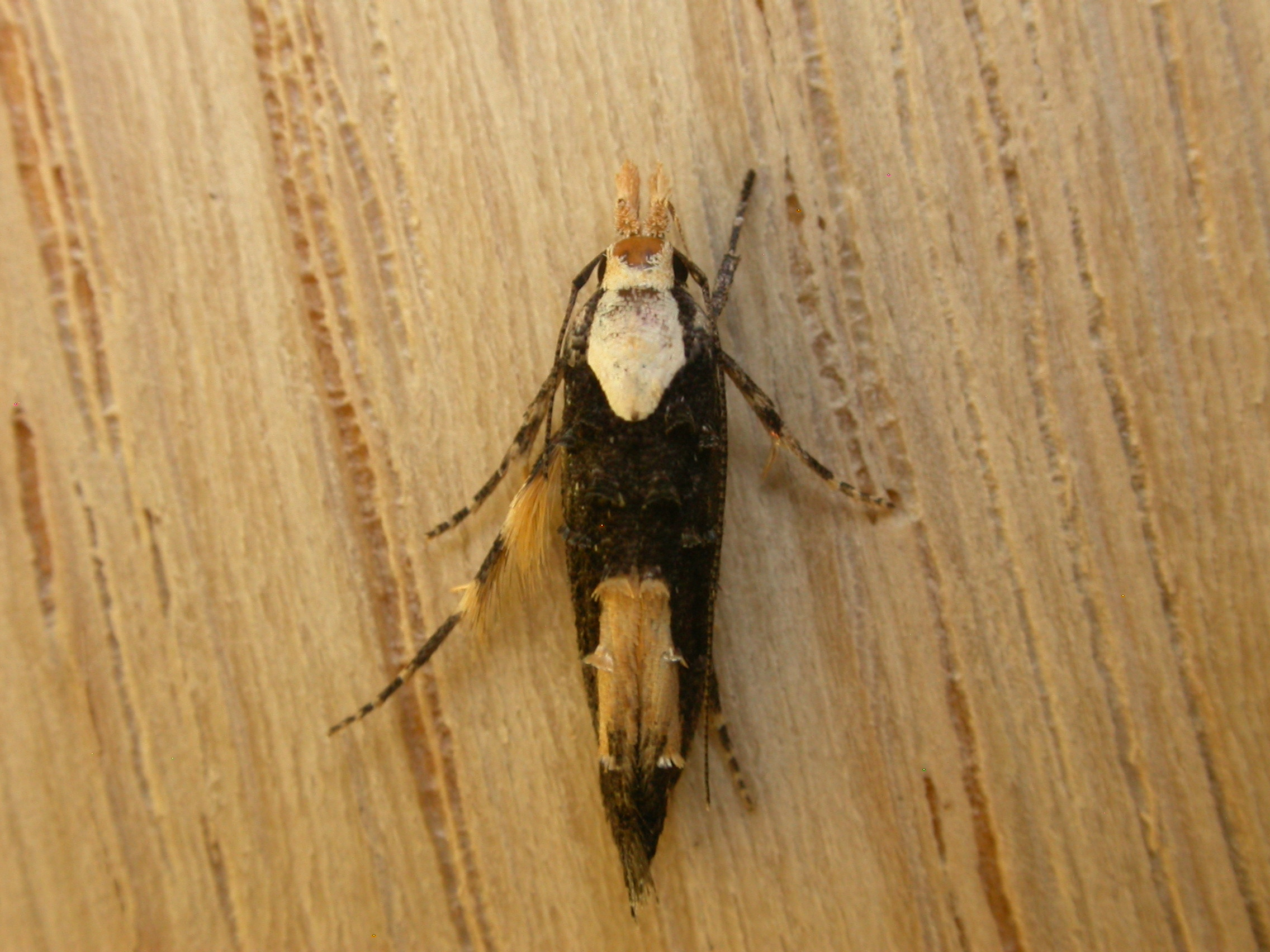

Scientific classification
- Domain: Eukaryota
- Kingdom: Animalia
- Phylum: Arthropoda
- Class: Insecta
- Order: Lepidoptera
- Family: Cosmopterigidae
- Genus: Trachydora
- Species: T. pygaea

Binomial name
- Trachydora pygaea (Turner, 1923)

Synonyms
- Syntomactis pygaea Turner, 1923

= Trachydora pygaea =

Species of moth

Trachydora pygaea is a species of moth of the family Cosmopterigidae. It is found in Australia.
