= Trachydora tephronota =

Scientific classification
- Domain: Eukaryota
- Kingdom: Animalia
- Phylum: Arthropoda
- Class: Insecta
- Order: Lepidoptera
- Family: Cosmopterigidae
- Genus: Trachydora
- Species: T. tephronota

Binomial name
- Trachydora tephronota (Turner, 1923)

Synonyms
- Syntomactis tephronota Turner, 1923

Species of moth

Trachydora tephronota is a moth in the family Cosmopterigidae. It is found in Australia, where it has been recorded from Queensland.
