= Trachydora macrostola =

Scientific classification
- Domain: Eukaryota
- Kingdom: Animalia
- Phylum: Arthropoda
- Class: Insecta
- Order: Lepidoptera
- Family: Cosmopterigidae
- Genus: Trachydora
- Species: T. macrostola

Binomial name
- Trachydora macrostola (Turner, 1923)

Synonyms
- Syntomactis macrostola Turner, 1923

Species of moth

Trachydora macrostola is a moth in the family Cosmopterigidae. It is found in Australia, where it has been recorded from Queensland.
