= Bainbrigge =

Bainbrigge is a surname. Notable people with the surname include:

- Philip Bainbrigge (1786–1862), English lieutenant-general
- Philip Gillespie Bainbrigge (1890–1918), British classicist and poet
- Philip John Bainbrigge (1817–1881), British artist
- Reginald Bainbrigge (died 1555), Sixteenth century academic
- Thomas Bainbrigge Fletcher (1878–1950), English entomologist

== See also ==
- Bainbrigg
