= Daniel Bolton =

English military engineer and naturalist (1793–1860)

- Born: April 1793; Norwich, Norfolk, England
- Died: 16 May 1860 (aged 67); Cape Town, Cape of Good Hope
- Burial place: St George's cemetery, Cape Town, South Africa
- Spouse: Ann Lawrence Hawkes (widow) (m. 1825–1854)
- Children: John Lawrence Bolton; Augusta Bolton
- Military career
- Allegiance: United Kingdom
- Branch: Board of Ordnance; British Army
- Service years: 1811–1860
- Rank: Major General
- Service number: 459
- Unit: Corps of Royal Engineers
- Commands: CRE, Harwich, 1846–47; CRE, New Zealand, 1847–53; CRE, Cape of Good Hope, 1855–60
- Campaigns: Napoleonic Wars; Peninsular War; San Sebastián; Hundred Days; Occupation of France (1815–18)
- Memorials: Major's Hill Park, Ottawa, Ontario, Canada; Peninsula and Waterloo Campaigns 1808–15 Memorial, Rochester Cathedral, Rochester, Kent
- Other work: Member of the Executive Council, Province of New Ulster, New Zealand, 1851– Magistrate for the Islands of New Zealand, 1853

Major General Daniel Bolton (April 1793 – 16 May 1860) was an English military engineer of the Corps of Royal Engineers, who served in the Peninsular War (1813–1814), Netherlands Campaign (1814–1815), army of occupation in France (1815–1818), in Canada (1823–1843), particularly as superintending engineer in the construction of the Rideau Canal (1832–1843) and as Commanding Royal Engineer at Harwich (1846–1847), New Zealand (1847–1853) and Cape of Good Hope (1855–1860).

He also collected fossil, plant, insect and seashell specimens, particularly for the scientific collections under Sir William Jackson Hooker and Joseph Dalton Hooker at the Royal Botanic Gardens, Kew, William Henry Harvey at the Herbarium, Trinity College Dublin, and Francis Walker at the British Museum.

== Early years ==
Daniel Bolton, born on or about 11 April 1793, at Norwich, Norfolk, England, was the second of thirteen children of John Bolton (1767–1851), an excise officer, and Mary Jodrell (1767–1851), a daughter of the Rev. Daniel Jodrell, Rector of Hingham, Norfolk, and Mary Breeze. He was baptised at the church of St Peter Parmentergate, Norwich on 14 April 1793.

Regarding the family's connection with Vice Admiral Horatio Nelson, 1st Viscount Nelson, ancestral records indicate that Daniel Bolton's first cousin once removed, Thomas Bolton, had married Horatio's sister, Susannah Nelson, in 1780.

== Career ==
Daniel Bolton was commissioned 2nd Lieutenant in the Corps of Royal Engineers, Board of Ordnance, on 14 December 1811, and promoted lieutenant on 1 July 1812.

=== Europe ===
==== Peninsular War ====
Bolton is said to have been "present, among other actions, at the siege and storm of St Sebastian". The Commanding Royal Engineer, Sir Richard Fletcher, was killed in the final assault of the fortress on 31 August; thereafter the siege was conducted by Lieutenant Colonel John Fox Burgoyne, RE, who was severely wounded in that effort which ended on 8 September 1813. Elsewhere, Bolton is noted as serving at the Peninsula from October 1813 to the end of the war in 1814.

==== Netherlands Campaign ====
In May 1815, Bolton was lodged at Ghent, where Louis XVIII resided after quitting Paris in March, but as his superior had left without passing on instructions, he and his fellow engineers had little to do. Sir George Wood, commanding artillery, who had fallen in with them there, communicated their situation to Colonel Carmichael-Smyth. In consequence, Lieutenant John Sperling, RE, took charge from 1 April, with the two engineer officers, an assistant engineer and 250 men, to construct two earthen redoubts to defend the bridge over the river Scheldt and reinstate part of the city's misshapen rampart. The redoubts would burden the enemy with having to build a river crossing, as well as serve as a rallying point for troops retreating from the frontier. When Sperling departed on 10 April, Bolton took charge of the works and now 2000 workmen until the arrival of Captain Harris. The Battle of Waterloo was fought on 18 June 1815, some 43 miles away.

==== Occupation of France ====
Following the Napoleonic Wars and agreements to the Treaty of Paris in November 1815, Bolton served with the army of occupation in France to 1818.

=== Canada ===
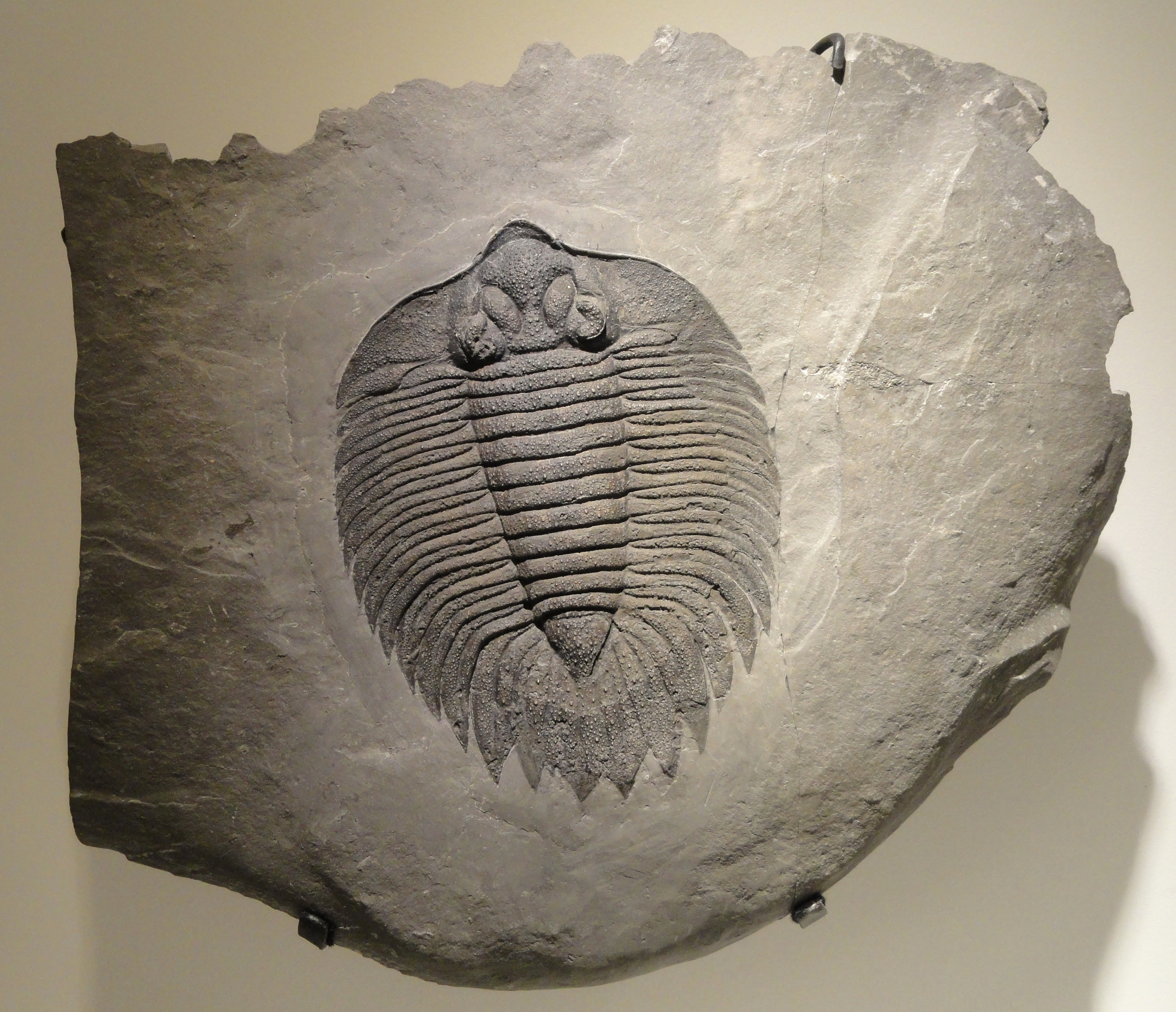
Trilobite Arctinurus boltoni. Original name: Paradoxus boltoni Bigsby, 1825

Some five years after France, Bolton left London for Canada on 13 April 1823, landing at Quebec from the brig Susan on 23 May 1823. Under Lieutenant Colonel Elias Walker Durnford, Commanding Royal Engineer, he carried on works from Quebec City to Kingston, Ontario, including Fort Wellington at Prescott. In the course of the works he discovered a new species of trilobite in fossil limestone. It was described by John Jeremiah Bigsby who named it Paradoxus boltoni, "after its discoverer, Lieut. Bolton, Royal Engineers", in 1825. The specimen had been found at Lockport, New York.

=== England and Ireland ===
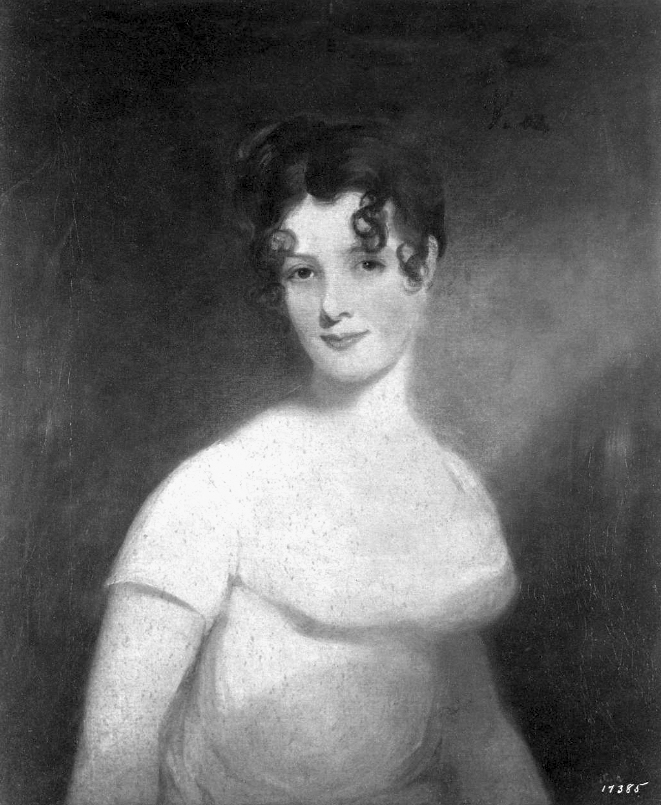
Ann Lawrence, 1807. Artist: Thomas Sully

Home again in England, Daniel Bolton married Ann Lawrence Hawkes, daughter of the late Judge John Lawrance of New York, at St Philip's Cathedral, Birmingham, Warwickshire, on Wednesday, 23 February 1825. Ann was the widow of George Wright Hawkes (1780–1821) of Dudley, England, who'd settled in New York City in 1798, and mother of Adelaide and Wootton Wright Hawkes.

Soon after, on 7 June 1825, Bolton advanced to the rank of 2nd Captain. Their first child, John Lawrence Bolton, was born on 7 December 1825 at Drumcovitt House in the Parish of Banagher, County Londonderry, Ireland.

=== Canada and the Rideau Canal ===
Drawn out of retirement, Lieutenant Colonel John By was, on 21 April 1826, appointed Commanding Engineer for the Rideau Canal; the 200 kilometre military canal to be cut through the Canadian wilderness to connect Montreal to Kingston by a more secure route in the event of another American invasion. He landed at Quebec City on 30 May 1826, and headed on to Montreal a few days later to make a start on the canal project.

John Mactaggart, a civil engineer recommended by John Rennie for By's Clerk of Works, also joined the project. In October, Colonel Durnford at Montreal, recommended that By employ Bolton at Kingston, the canal's proposed terminal, and accordingly Bolton was assigned to By's staff. MacTaggart soon noted Bolton's keen scientific interests: "Boulder Stones of all sorts and sizes, are met with in abundance in Lower Canada: my worthy and scientific friend, Capt. Bolton, R.E. who examined these with the care of mineralogist, expressed himself astonished at the great variety and value. There is little lime, however, in any of them." Soon after the Natural History Society of Montreal (NHSM) was formed in May 1827, Bolton was elected a founding member on 27 August 1827, along with By, MacTaggart and others that year, and contributed to the Society's programme.

The Boltons' second child, Augusta Bolton, was born at Ontario in 1828.

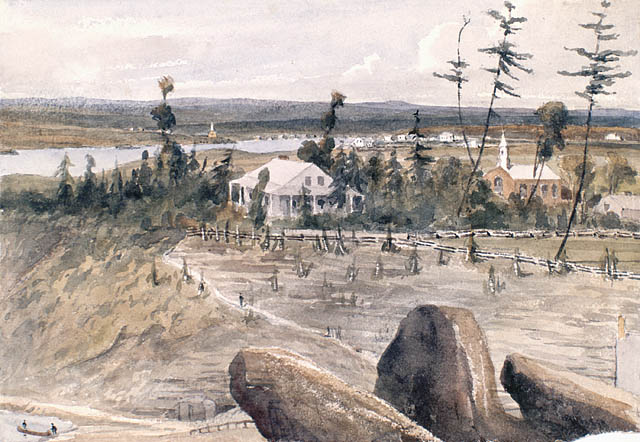
View from Barrack Hill toward Major's Hill and Maj Bolton's family residence, 1841. Artist: Lt Philip Bainbrigge, RE

Dogged by the unrealistically low estimates formed during the canal's conception before By's appointment, and despite early least-sum estimates at its inception, it was an impossible task to calculate the exact cost to construct the Rideau Canal—"135 miles long, through an uncleared country, with eighteen or twenty miles of excavation, some of which was rock, and deep cutting, with forty-seven locks to surmount, a difference of level of 455 feet, with a variety of extensive dams and waste weirs necessary to regulate the spring torrents of the Rideau River, which is the outlet of several lakes." In 1832, the year of the completion of the canal, By was recalled to England to explain construction costs. Bolton took over as Superintending Royal Engineer and moved into By's former Bytown residence.

Bolton was promoted to captain on 10 January 1837. Later that year, 27 September 1837, Charles Daubeny of Oxford University visited Bytown:

"Obtained from Captain Bolton a specimen of Sarracenia purpurea, which grows in the swamps adjacent. He also presented me with several minerals, obtained from boulders, broken during the formation of the Rideau Canal. The rocks found in situ at Bytown and neighbourhood, consist of that dark, fœtid, limestone, loaded with organic remains, which I saw at Quebec and Montreal. The Captain had found in it Trilobites of several species, both large and small, the Huron fossil (orthoceratite), turritellæ, encrinites, common and lily, and several other fossils. The organic remains are very abundant near the Chaudiere falls."

Bolton advanced to ranks of brevet major on 28 June 1838, major in the army on 3 July 1838 and lieutenant colonel on 29 March 1839 as Superintendent of the Canal. After more than sixteen-years of service in Canada, Bolton's assignment came to an end in 1843. He was succeeded by Major Francis Ringler Thomson, RE. The family's close connection with Bytown, drew some 300 of its oldest inhabitants to present Bolton and his family with a substantial farewell address on 9 August 1843.

=== England: Harwich ===
Back in England Bolton was assigned the role of Commanding Royal Engineer at Harwich, Essex, where in 1846 his office worked on the sea wall and other works.

He was promoted to rank of lieutenant colonel on 16 November 1846 and took on assignment as Commanding Royal Engineer to New Zealand, to relieve Major William Biddlecomb Marlow, CRE, with a detachment of 13 men of the Royal Sappers and Miners in company with Captain William Kenny, the Pioneer Company of the Royal New Zealand Fencible Corps and their families.

Following the 1845 battles at Te Kahika pā and Ōhaeawai pā in New Zealand, Marlow had sent drawings and descriptions of Ōhaeawai pā to England, enabling similar test sections of the pā to be erected on the left of the Chatham Lines in August, September, October and December 1846. Experiments in determining the best mode of breaching them by bags of powder were carried out. Bolton and the Sappers with Kenny and the Fencibles, settled on board the Ramillies, departed the Port of Tilbury, River Thames, for New Zealand on 14 April 1847.

=== England: Home for family ===
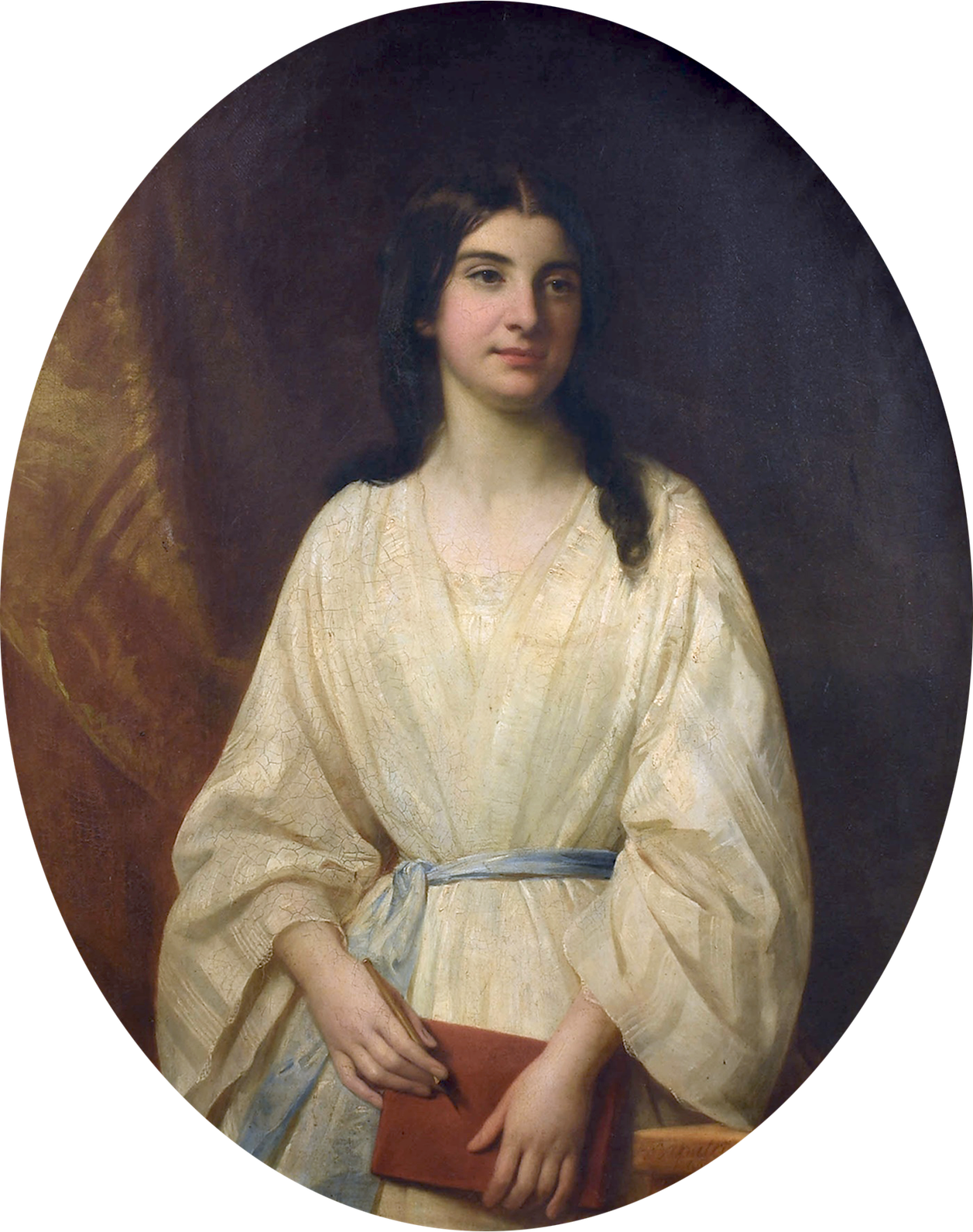
Augusta Bolton, c.1855. Artist: Alessandro Capalti, Rome

After almost seven years abroad, in New Zealand, Bolton arrived home to the reality of Britain and France's support for Turkey, and their declarations of war upon Russia in late March 1854. Bolton and his family were not unaffected.

Ann signed her will on 1 April 1854 and appears to have left England soon after. As the Crimean campaign invasion force assembled at Varna, Turkey, New York's Evening Post of 5 September 1854 reported from that scene of death—11,000 men from cholera, and more from dysentery and typhus— that Ann Lawrance Bolton, wife of Colonel Bolton, and daughter of the late Judge John Lawrance of New York, had died at Varna on 2 August. Some nine months later, on 25 May 1855, daughter Augusta married Lieutenant Edward Charles Acheson Gordon, RE, at Constantinople. Gordon had served in the campaign since the April 1854 start and, along with Lieutenant Pratt, RE, and a detachment of Sappers and Miners, had landed at Varna on 22 May 1854 from HMS Caradoc to build wooden piers for landing the troops, horses and ordnance in preparation for build-up of forces. Augusta's brother, Captain John Bolton, RA, served in the Crimea from 12 April 1855 and took part in the battle of Sebastopol.

Following leave and promotion to brevet colonel on 20 June 1854, Bolton took assignment to the Cape of Good Hope, largely at the insistence of Sir George Grey, now Lieutenant Governor of Cape Colony. On 13 December he advanced to rank of colonel, to relieve Colonel Pennel Cole, RE, as Commanding Royal Engineer.

=== Cape of Good Hope ===
Stationed upon the frontier at Grahamstown, Eastern Cape, in early 1856 Bolton was elected a member of the newly formed Graham's Town Literary, Scientific and Medical Society—founders of the Albany Museum. Bolton advanced to the rank of major general on 20 June 1859, in succession to the late Major General Thomas Blanshard, CB.

==== Death ====
Bolton carried on collecting botanical specimens throughout the district. During a long ride on 31 December 1859, several months after the Carrington Event, he was overcome by "sun-stroke" and nearly died. Having resigned his command, and whilst moving on toward Cape Town in the expectation of returning home to England, he suffered a second crippling apoplectic fit at Port Elizabeth and died on 16 May 1860, aged 66. In reporting the news to Sir William Hooker in July, Dr William Guybon Atherstone asserted that "he was a great lover of plants and an excellent geologist."

Bolton was buried at St George's burying ground, Cape Town, with full military honours. The services attended by the Lieutenant Governor General Wynyard, CB, Commander of the Forces, Colonel Alexander Gordon, RE, the whole of the garrison troops, officers and men of HMS Brisk, and a large number of civilians and friends. The Grahamstown Journal wrote:

In May, 1855, Major-General Bolton came to this country, principally at the insistence of Sir George Grey, after a very short sojourn with his family in England; he was stationed, until with a few weeks of his death, upon the frontier, where his amiable qualities and intelligent mind won for him deservedly the admiration and esteem of all who had the good fortune to be thrown in contact with him. His memory will long hold a high place in the estimation of numerous friends who had the pleasure of cultivating his much-valued acquaintance.

That year, Bolton's sister anonymously published a book of personal poetry in his memory, called The Rainbow, which included some of his poems.

Thomas Bernard Collinson, RE, recalling his time in New Zealand, wrote:

My commanding officer was Colonel Bolton, a most kind hearted and agreeable man; who took more interest in his friends than his Engineer duties. Whenever he came to inspect my district, we passed most of our time fishing for shells, some of which, like other animals & plants in N.Z. were of special Biological interest. He could not however tell me the special scientific interest of the "Trochus Imperialis", he was satisfied in its being a beautiful & a valuable shell! and many a splendid specimen we fished up in Cook Strait.

== Legacy ==
Plant and animal species named after Daniel Bolton:

- Arctinurus boltoni. Original name: Paradoxus boltoni Bigsby, 1825 – a trilobite
- Myadora boltoni Smith, 1880 – a New Zealand mollusc
- Leioproctus boltoni Cockerell, 1904 – a New Zealand bee
- Asplenium boltonii Hook. – Bolton's Mother Fern. An African fern collected at Grahamstown, Cape of Good Hope
- Bonatea boltonii Harvey, 1860 – a southern African orchid.

He is remembered in Ottawa in Bolton Street and Major's Hill Park, a prominent downtown park; site of the former residence of Lieutenant Colonel John By, and Major Daniel Bolton and his family.

== Publications ==
- Bolton, Daniel (1840). "X. Account of the Dam Constructed Across the Waste Channel at Long Island, on the Rideau Canal, in 1836" (PDF). Papers on Subjects Connected with the Duties of the Corps of Royal Engineers. 4. London: John Weale: 131–135.
- Anonymous: Daniel Bolton's sister (1860). The Rainbow: Various Pieces on Religious and Other Subjects. Bath: Binns & Goodwin.

== Bibliography ==
- Godley, Eric John (December 2003). "Biographical Notes (52): Daniel Bolton (c. 1793–1860)" (PDF). New Zealand Botanical Society Newsletter. No. 74. New Zealand Botanical Society. pp. 14–16.
- Plug, C. (2020). "Bolton, Maj-Gen Daniel (plant collection)". S2A3 Biographical Database of Southern African Science.
- Tulloch, Judith (1981). "The Rideau Canal: Defence, Transport and Recreation" (PDF). History and Archaeology 50. Parks Canada – via digital edition, Friends of the Rideau, Smiths Falls, Ontario, 2009.
