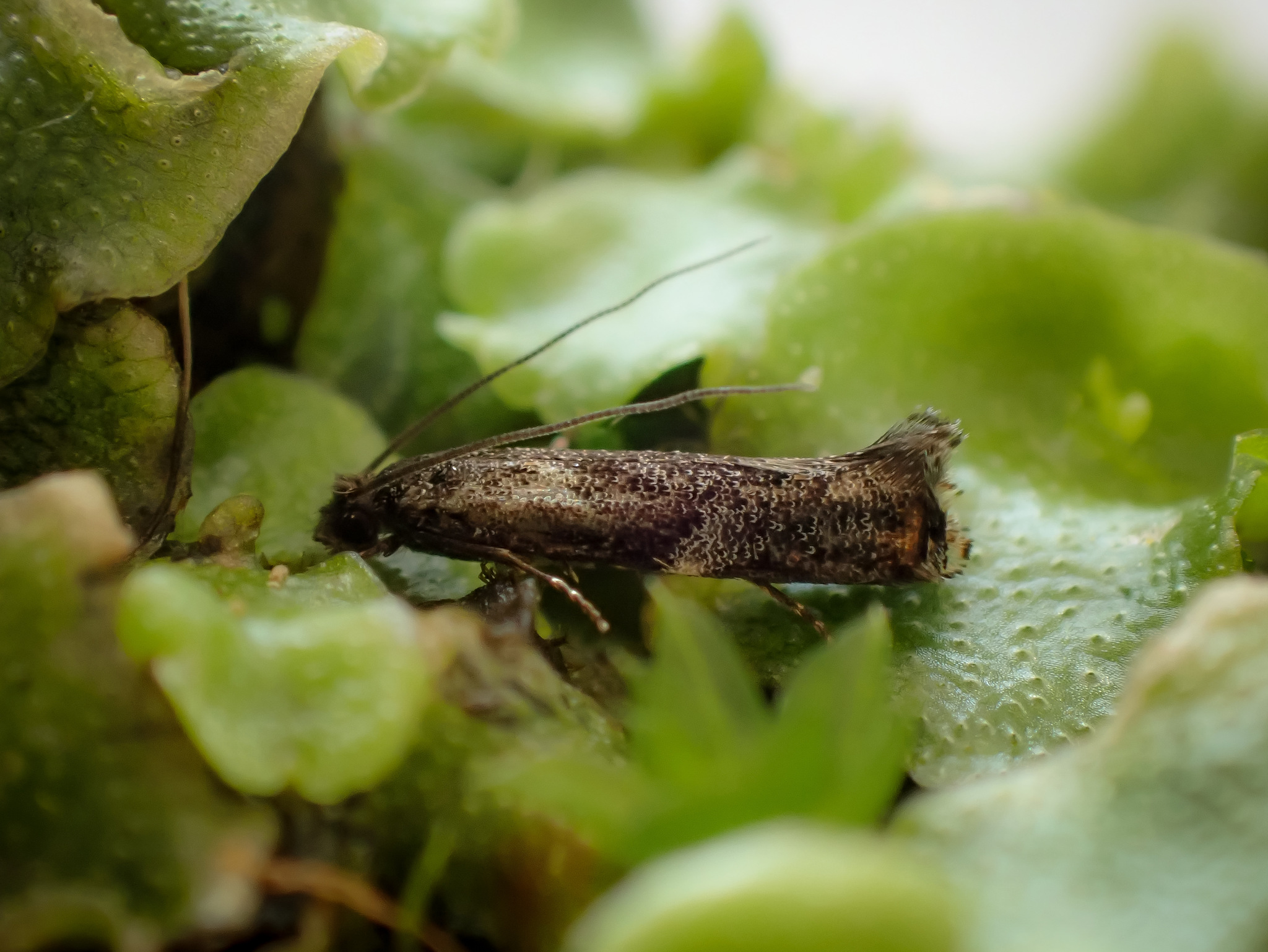

Scientific classification
- Kingdom: Animalia
- Phylum: Arthropoda
- Clade: Pancrustacea
- Class: Insecta
- Order: Lepidoptera
- Family: Tineidae
- Genus: Erechthias
- Species: E. externella

Binomial name
- Erechthias externella (Walker, 1864)

Synonyms
- Glyphipterix externella Walker, 1864; Decadarchis monastra Meyrick, 1891; Erechthias erebistis Meyrick, 1892; Tinea bisignella Walker, 1864

= Erechthias externella =

Species of moth

Erechthias externella is a species of moth in the family Tineidae. It was described by Francis Walker in 1864. This species is endemic to New Zealand and is found in the North and South Islands. This species inhabits native scrub. The larvae likely feed on either deceased plant detritus or tough leaves of plants such as palms or flax. Adults are sun-lovers and appear on the wing in October. They actively fly in the afternoon when their movements are rapid and can be hard to follow. They have also been trapped using blacklight.

== Taxonomy ==
This species was first described by Francis Walker in 1864 and named Glyphipterix externella. Also in 1864 Walker, thinking he was describing a new species, named this moth Tinea bisignella. In 1891 Edward Meyrick, also thinking he was describing a new species, named this moth Decadarchis monastra. In 1892 Meyrick again described this species thinking it was new and named it Erechthias erebistis. In 1915 Meyrick placed Glyphipterix externella in the genus Erechthias and synonymised E. erebistis. In 1919 Meyrick synonymised Decadarchis monastra with E. externella. In 1927 Alfred Philpott studied and illustrated the male genitalia of this species. George Hudson discussed and illustrated this species in his 1928 book The butterflies and moths of New Zealand under the name Erechthias externella. In 1988 John S. Dugdale confirmed the placement of this species in the genus Erechthias and synonymised Tinea bisignella with this species. Walker's assertion that the collector of the type specimen was Colonel Bolton was regarded by Dugdale as erroneous. The male holotype specimen was collected by Thomas R. Oxley in Nelson and is held at the Natural History Museum, London.

== Description ==
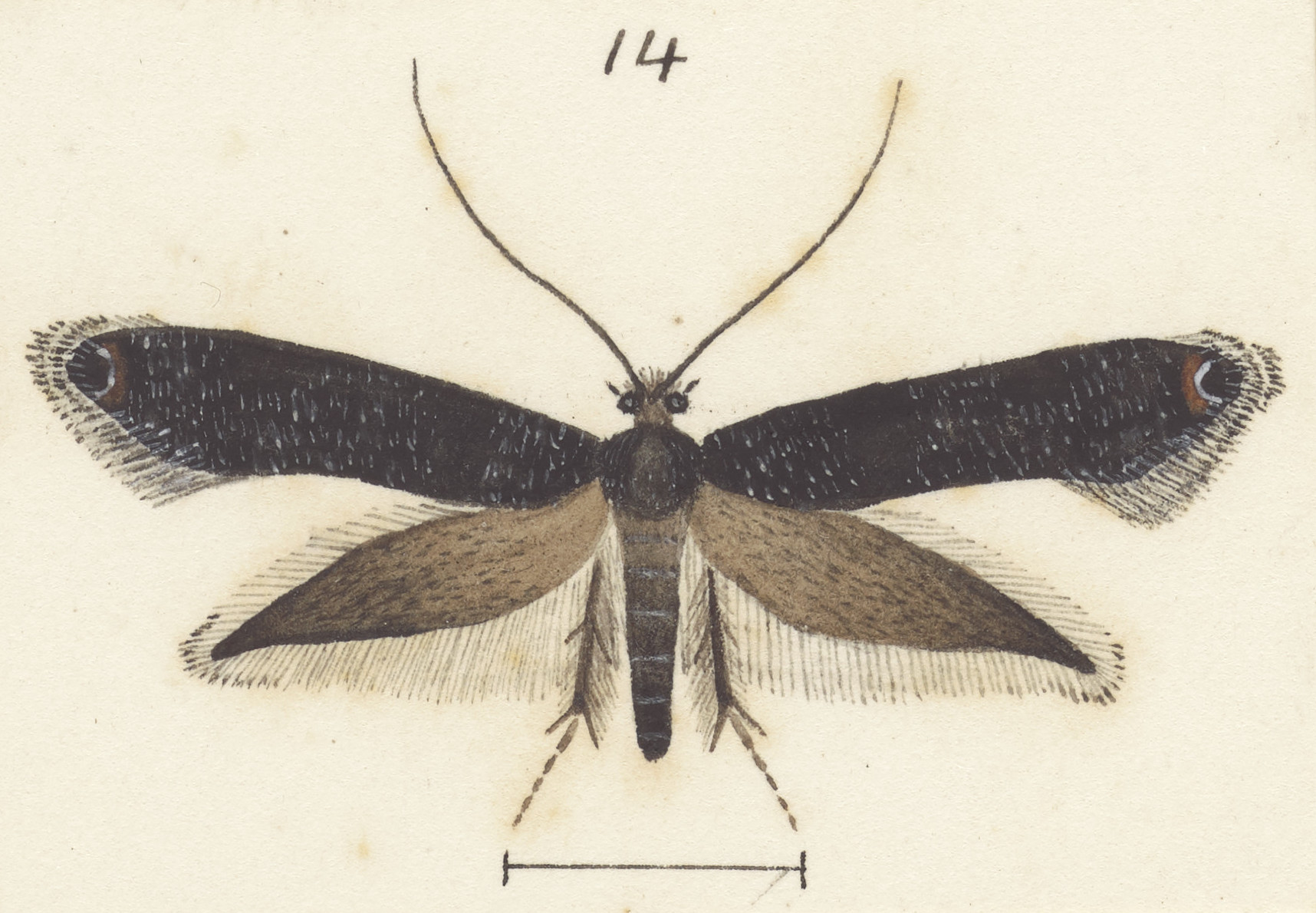
Male

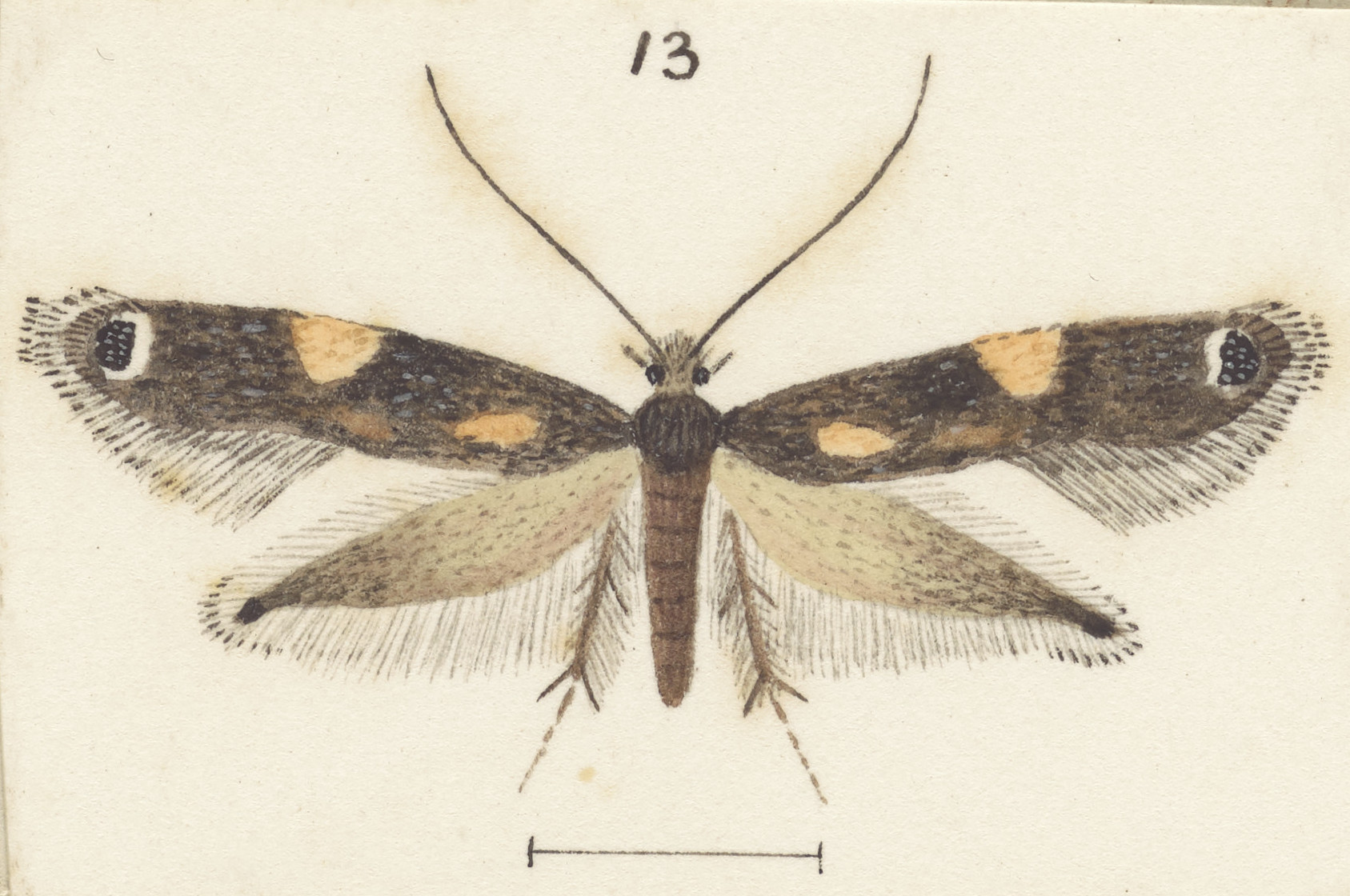
Female

Hudson described this species as follows:

The expansion of the wings is slightly under 1/2 inch. The fore-wings are elongate-oblong with the costa slightly arched and the tornus rounded; very deep purplish-black with coppery reflections; there are two indistinct darker transverse bands; a coppery crescentic mark near the apex, enclosing a paler, black-centred, eye-like spot which occupies the whole of the apical lappet; the entire wing is also irregularly strewn with bluish-white scales. The hind-wings are warm. brown, thickly speckled with black and with a black spot on the pointed apex. In the female the general colour of the fore-wings is considerably paler and browner; there is a very conspicuous ochreous-whitish patch on the costa beyond the middle and a smaller patch of the same colour near the dorsum at about 1/4.

== Distribution ==
This species is endemic to New Zealand. This species has been observed in the North and South Islands.

== Habitat and hosts ==
This species frequents scrub. Larvae of species in the genus Erechthias feed on dead plant debris or the tough leaves of plants such as palms.

== Behaviour ==
E. externella is a sun-lover, and appears in early New Zealand spring, flying actively in the afternoon. At such times the movements of the adults are extremely hard to follow. The perfect insect appears in October. This species is also attracted to blacklight.
