= Thomas Bainbridge =

Thomas Bainbridge may refer to:

- Thomas Bainbrigg (died 1646), or Bainbridge, English college head
- Thomas Bainbrigg (controversialist) (1636–1703), or Bainbridge, English Protestant controversialist
- Thomas Bainbridge (politician) (1831–1901), member of the Wisconsin State Assembly
