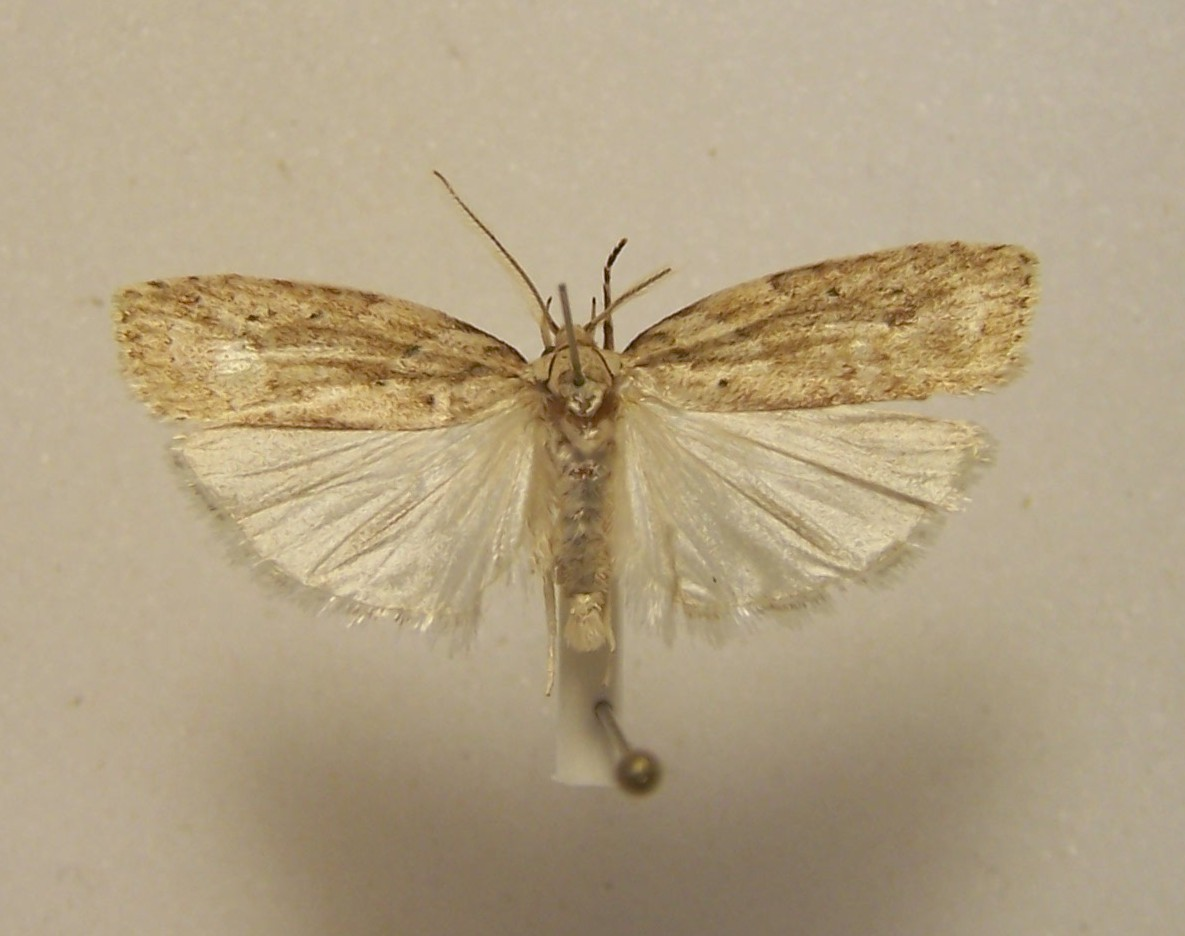
- Male

Scientific classification
- Kingdom: Animalia
- Phylum: Arthropoda
- Clade: Pancrustacea
- Class: Insecta
- Order: Lepidoptera
- Family: Depressariidae
- Genus: Agriophara
- Species: A. colligatella

Binomial name
- Agriophara colligatella (Walker, 1864)

Synonyms
- Cryptolechia colligatella Walker, 1864; Atomotricha colligatella (Walker, 1864); Agriophara coricopa (Meyrick, 1897); Hypeuryntis coricopa Meyrick, 1897

= Agriophara colligatella =

Species of moth endemic to New Zealand

Agriophara colligatella, also known as the Olearia skeletoniser, is a moth of the family Depressariidae. It is endemic to New Zealand and is found on both the North and South Islands. This species inhabits native scrub. Larvae feed on the leaves of species in the genus Olearia during the months of November and December. They then pupate amongst the old flowers and leaves of their host plant. Adults have been observed on the wing from August to September but are most common in January. It has been hypothesised that this species overwinters as an adult as it has been observed on the wing in late autumn and early winter. Adults are attracted to light.

== Taxonomy ==
This species was first described by Francis Walker in 1864 and named Cryptolechia colligatella. Walker, in making his description, used a specimen collected by Daniel Bolton in Auckland. In 1915 Edward Meyrick placed this species in the genus Atomotricha. This placement was confirmed by Meyrick in 1922. George Hudson also discussed A. colligatella under the name Atomotricha colligatella in his book The Butterflies and Moths of New Zealand but stated he was unacquainted with this species. However Hudson also discussed in detail and illustrated the species Agriophara coricopa, which is currently regarded as a synonym of A. colligtella. In 1988 J. S. Dugdale placed this species within the genus Agriophara. In the same publication he synonymised Agriophara coricopa with A. colligatella. In 2010 Dr Robert Hoare agreed with this recombination and confirmed the endemic nature of this species. The male holotype specimen is held in the Natural History Museum, London.

== Description ==
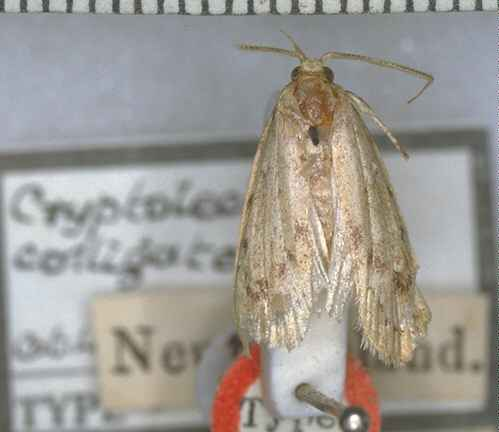
Holotype of Agriophara colligatella.

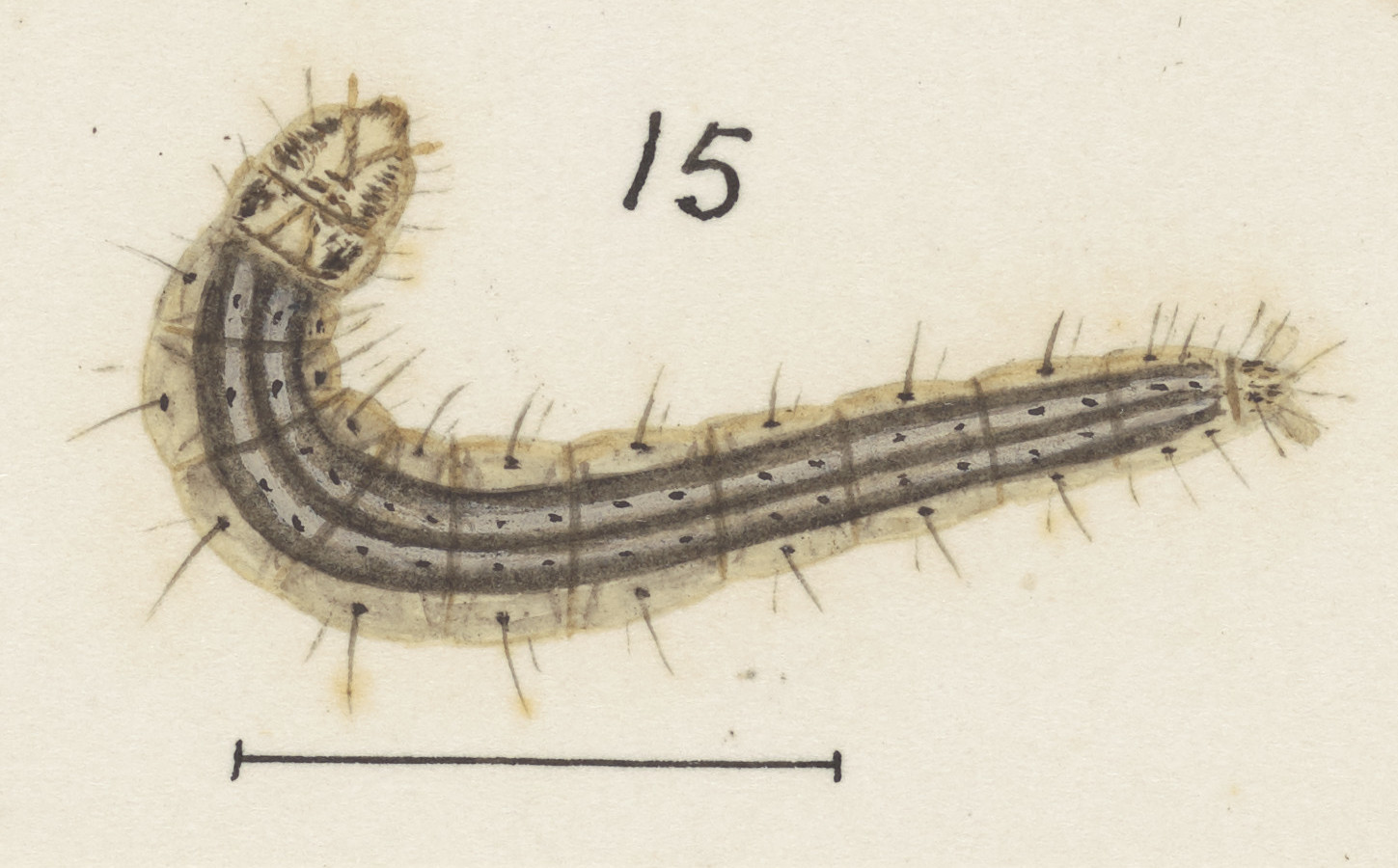
Illustration of larva.

Walker described the adult male of this species as follows:

Male. Hoary, rather stout. Palpi smooth, nearly twice longer than the breadth of the head; third joint setiform, as long as the second. Antennae thickly clothed with long slender hairs. Abdomen extending rather beyond the hind wings. Hind tibiae stout, fringed. Fore wings rather broad, minutely brown-speckled, slightly acute, with an exterior line composed of irregular blackish dots, and very deeply retracted towards the costa; two blackish points in the disk nearer the base, and a submarginal curved line of blackish points; exterior border slightly convex, very oblique; under side with a brownish tinge. Length of the body 5 lines; of the wings 15 lines.

Hudson, when discussing A. coricopa now synonymised with A. colligatella, described the larvae of this species as follows:

The larva is about 1/2 inch in length, rather stout, tapering at each end. The head is brown with three broad darker brown bands; the second segment is pale brown and horny; the rest of the body creamy white with three dark brown dorsal stripe; each segment has eight dark brownish or black warts generally surmounted by a fine yellowish bristle.

The pupa is stout, is approximately 8 mm long and is coloured reddish to mahogany brown.

== Distribution ==
This species is endemic to New Zealand and is found in the North and South Islands. Specimens in the collection of the Auckland War Memorial Museum have been collected in the Auckland, Wellington, and Otago regions. Specimens in the collection of Te Papa include those collected in the Taranaki region. A. colligatella larvae have also been observed in Fiordland, eastern Otago, and the West Coast.

== Behaviour ==
The larvae of this species feeds in November and December and then pupates amongst the old flowers or leaves of its host plants. The larvae feed only on the green portion of the leaf causing the remains to whither and thus indicate the presence of the larvae to observers. Adults of this species have been seen on the wing from August to September but is most common in January. As this species has also been observed in late autumn or early winter Hudson hypothesised that this species may well overwinter as adults. Adults are attracted to light.

== Habitat and host species ==
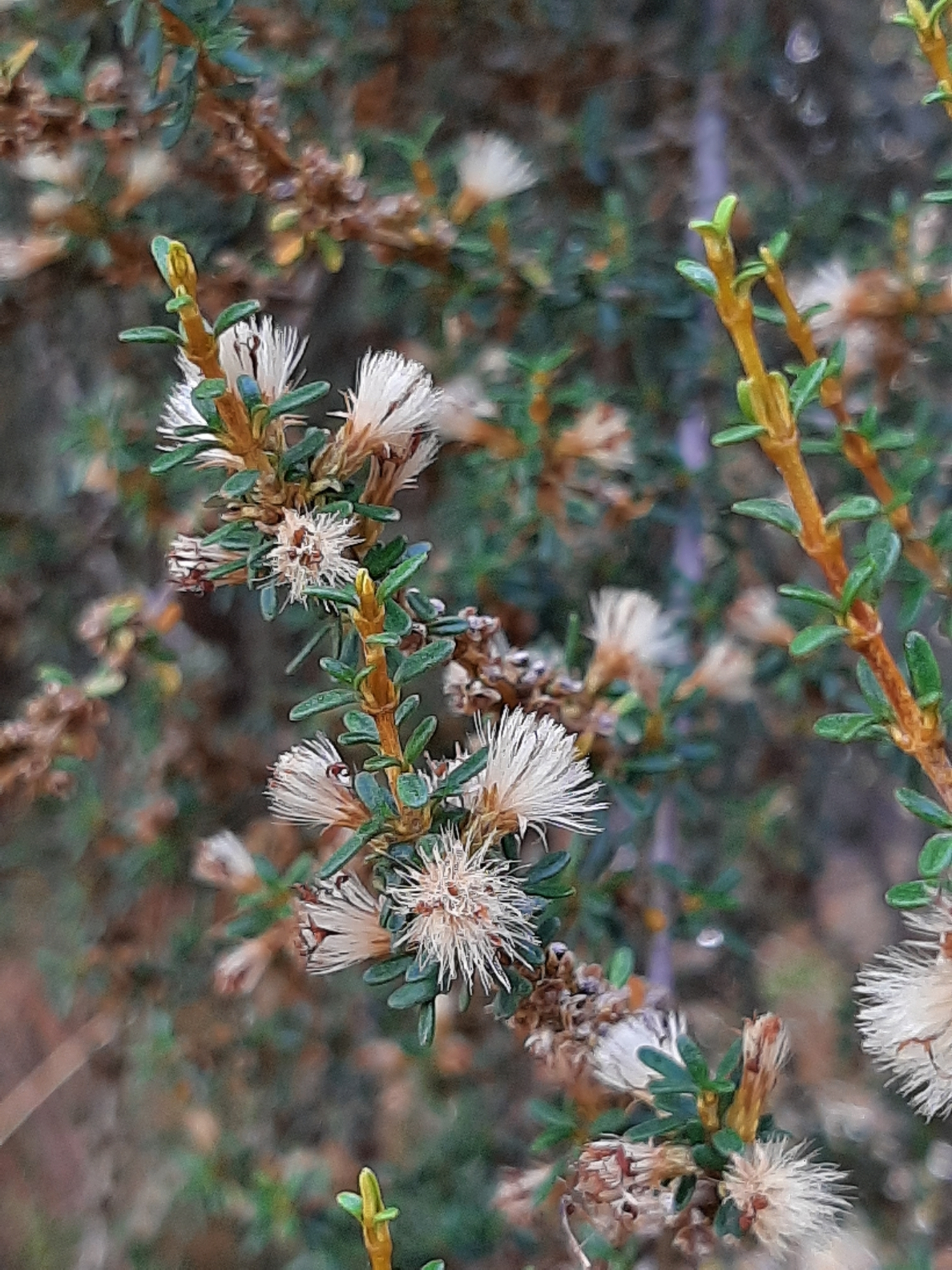
Olearia solandri, larval host species.

A. colligatella inhabits native scrub. Its larvae have been observed feeding on various Olearia species, including O. solandri, O. fragrantissima and O. laxiflora; the larvae are classified as Olearia specialists.
