= Agriophara levis =

Scientific classification
- Kingdom: Animalia
- Phylum: Arthropoda
- Class: Insecta
- Order: Lepidoptera
- Family: Depressariidae
- Genus: Agriophara
- Species: A. levis

Binomial name
- Agriophara levis Meyrick, 1921

Species of moth

Agriophara levis is a moth in the family Depressariidae. It was described by Edward Meyrick in 1921. It is found in Australia, where it has been recorded from Queensland.

The wingspan is 18–20 mm. The forewings are white with lilac-fuscous reflections, irrorated dark fuscous and with a short longitudinal line of blackish scales from the base of the costa, and other similar lines scattered in the disc. The stigmata are cloudy, of blackish irroration, the plical rather obliquely beyond the first discal. There is an oblique series of two or three small spots of dark irroration from the costa to the first and second discal respectively, and a strongly curved subterminal series of similar spots close to the margin. The hindwings are grey, paler towards the base.
