= Agriophara capnodes =

Scientific classification
- Kingdom: Animalia
- Phylum: Arthropoda
- Class: Insecta
- Order: Lepidoptera
- Family: Depressariidae
- Genus: Agriophara
- Species: A. capnodes

Binomial name
- Agriophara capnodes Meyrick, 1890

Species of moth

Agriophara capnodes is a moth in the family Depressariidae. It was described by Edward Meyrick in 1890. It is found in Australia, where it has been recorded from South Australia.

The wingspan is 23–25 mm. The forewings are fuscous, densely irrorated with dark fuscous. There is a series of faint longitudinal dark marks before the hindmargin. The hindwings are whitish-fuscous, towards the apex somewhat darker.
