= Agriophara parilis =

Scientific classification
- Kingdom: Animalia
- Phylum: Arthropoda
- Class: Insecta
- Order: Lepidoptera
- Family: Depressariidae
- Genus: Agriophara
- Species: A. parilis

Binomial name
- Agriophara parilis Meyrick, 1918

Species of moth

Agriophara parilis is a moth of the family Depressariidae. It is found in New Guinea.

The wingspan is about 18 mm. The forewings are white sprinkled pale grey, with scattered dark fuscous specks and an oblique series of three black marks from the base of the costa reaching half across the wing. There are small black spots on the costa at one-fourth and the middle, where oblique interrupted irregular grey lines cross the wing, the first marked with the blackish first discal stigma, the second shortly curved outwards above the middle and marked beneath this with two transversely placed small black dots representing the second discal stigma, thickened on the lower portion, running into the subterminal line before the dorsum. There is a curved grey subterminal line from four-fifths of the costa to the dorsum before the tornus and a fine terminal line of grey irroration, on the apical part of the costa forming three or four cloudy dark grey dots. The hindwings are whitish-grey.
