= Agriophara axesta =

Scientific classification
- Domain: Eukaryota
- Kingdom: Animalia
- Phylum: Arthropoda
- Class: Insecta
- Order: Lepidoptera
- Family: Depressariidae
- Genus: Agriophara
- Species: A. axesta

Binomial name
- Agriophara axesta Meyrick, 1890

Species of moth

Agriophara axesta is a moth in the family Depressariidae. It was described by Edward Meyrick in 1890. It is found in Australia, where it has been recorded from South Australia.

The wingspan is 19–21 mm. The forewings are fuscous-grey, irrorated with white and with a short black attenuated very oblique streak from the base of the costa, margined beneath with white towards the base. There are three transverse series of very obscure marks formed by a blackish irroration, the first nearly straight, from one-fourth of the costa to the sub-median fold before the middle, the second from the middle of the costa very obliquely outwards to the disc at three-fourths, where it is curved abruptly around and terminates in the disc at two-thirds, with some irregular marks beneath it. The third is found from two-thirds of the costa very obliquely outwards, near the apex bent around and continued near the hindmargin to the anal angle. The hindwings are fuscous-grey, lighter towards the base.
