= Agriophara dyscapna =

Scientific classification
- Domain: Eukaryota
- Kingdom: Animalia
- Phylum: Arthropoda
- Class: Insecta
- Order: Lepidoptera
- Family: Depressariidae
- Genus: Agriophara
- Species: A. dyscapna

Binomial name
- Agriophara dyscapna Turner, 1917

Species of moth

Agriophara dyscapna is a moth in the family Depressariidae. It was described by Alfred Jefferis Turner in 1917. It is found in Australia, where it has been recorded from Victoria.

The wingspan is about 25 mm. The forewings are dark fuscous irrorated with whitish scales, which tend to form longitudinal lines. The hindwings are grey.
