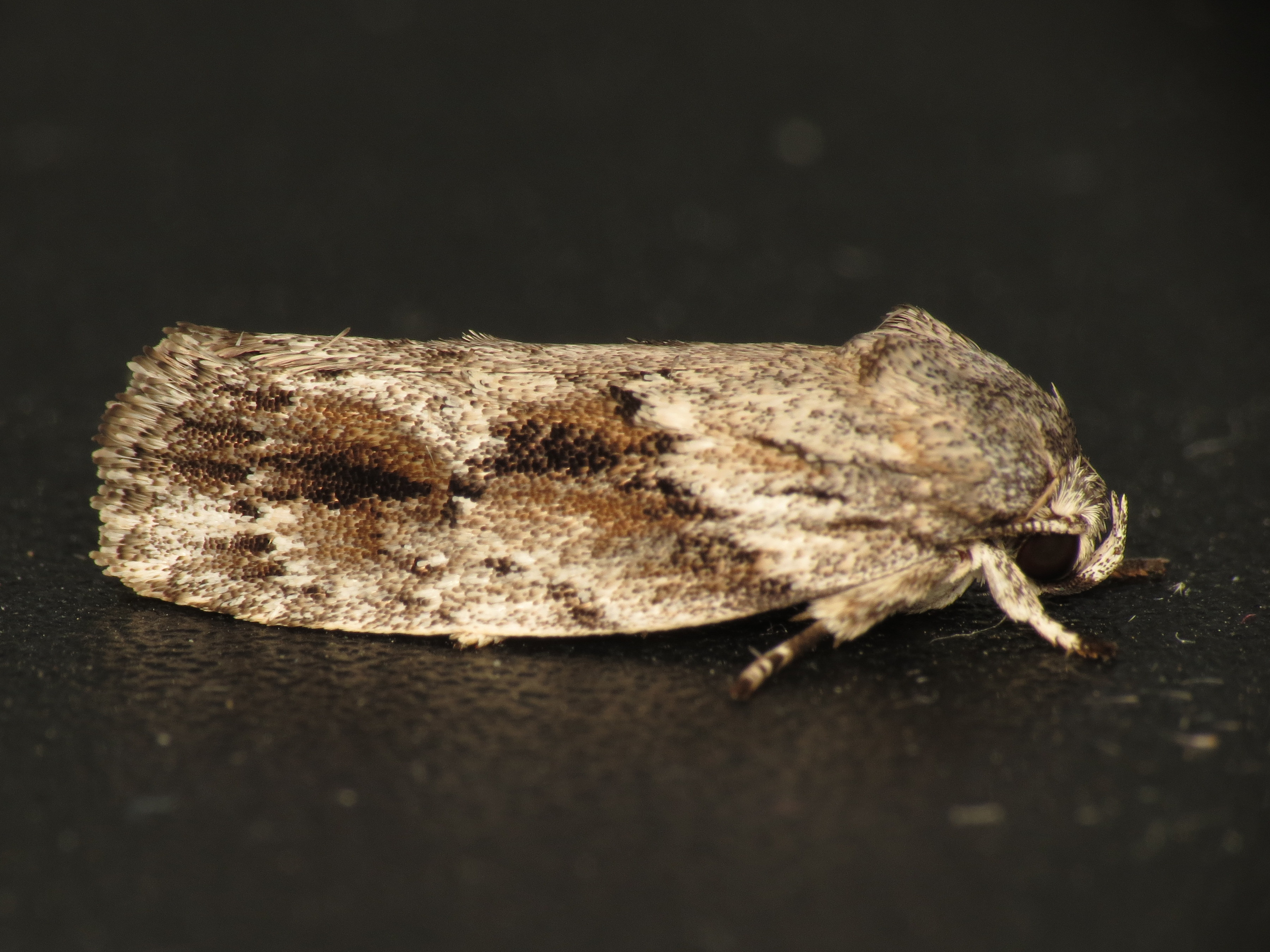
- Agriophara confertella

Scientific classification
- Kingdom: Animalia
- Phylum: Arthropoda
- Clade: Pancrustacea
- Class: Insecta
- Order: Lepidoptera
- Family: Depressariidae
- Subfamily: Stenomatinae
- Genus: Agriophara; Rosenstock, 1885

Synonyms
- Hypeuryntis Meyrick, 1897

= Agriophara =

Genus of moths

Agriophara is a genus of moths in the subfamily Stenomatinae. The genus was erected by Rudolph Rosenstock in 1885.

== Species ==
- Agriophara asaphes Diakonoff, 1948
- Agriophara atratella (Walker, 1866)
- Agriophara axesta Meyrick, 1890
- Agriophara biornata Diakonoff, 1954
- Agriophara bradleyi Diakonoff, 1954
- Agriophara capnodes Meyrick, 1890
- Agriophara colligatella (Walker, 1864)
- Agriophara cinderella (Newman, 1856)
- Agriophara cinerosa Rosenstock, 1885
- Agriophara confertella (Walker, 1864)
- Agriophara coricopa (Meyrick, 1897)
- Agriophara cremnopis Lower, 1894
- Agriophara curta (Lucas, 1900)
- Agriophara diminuta Rosenstock, 1885
- Agriophara discobola Turner, 1898
- Agriophara dyscapna Turner, 1917
- Agriophara fascifera Meyrick, 1890
- Agriophara gravis Meyrick, 1890
- Agriophara heterochroma Diakonoff, 1954
- Agriophara horridula Meyrick, 1890
- Agriophara hyalinota Lower, 1899
- Agriophara leptosemela Lower, 1893
- Agriophara leucanthes Turner, 1898
- Agriophara leucosta Lower, 1893
- Agriophara levis Meyrick, 1921
- Agriophara lysimacha Meyrick, 1915
- Agriophara murinella (Walker, 1864)
- Agriophara musicolor Meyrick, 1930
- Agriophara neoxanta Meyrick, 1915
- Agriophara nephelopa Diakonoff, 1954
- Agriophara neurometra (Meyrick, 1926)
- Agriophara nodigera Turner, 1900
- Agriophara parallela Diakonoff, 1954
- Agriophara parilis Meyrick, 1918
- Agriophara plagiosema (Turner, 1898)
- Agriophara platyscia Lower, 1908
- Agriophara poliopepla Turner, 1898
- Agriophara polistis (Lower, 1923)
- Agriophara salinaria Meyrick, 1931
- Agriophara tephroptera Lower, 1903
- Agriophara velitata (Lucas, 1900)
- Agriophara virescens Diakonoff, 1954
