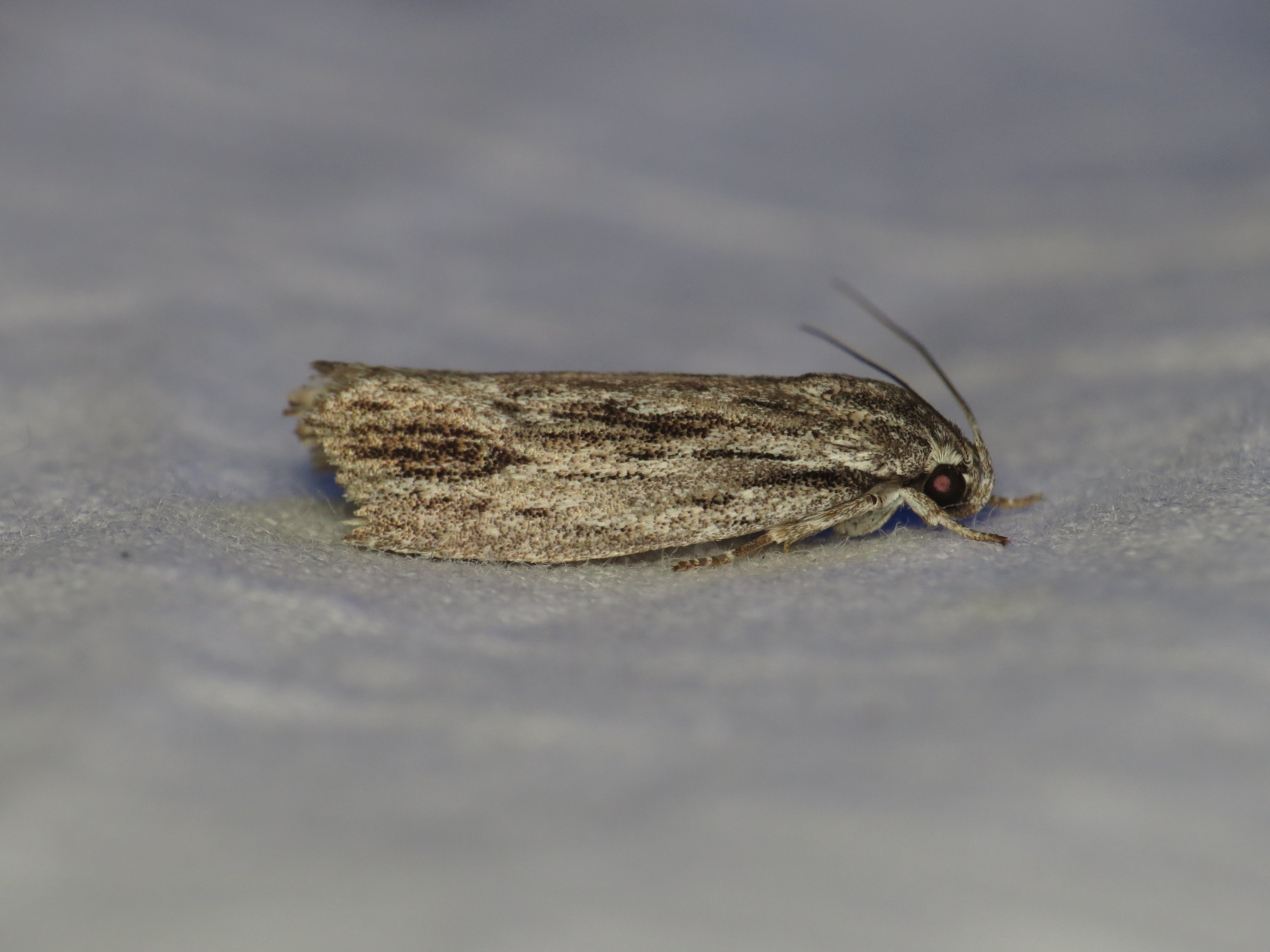

Scientific classification
- Domain: Eukaryota
- Kingdom: Animalia
- Phylum: Arthropoda
- Class: Insecta
- Order: Lepidoptera
- Family: Depressariidae
- Genus: Agriophara
- Species: A. platyscia

Binomial name
- Agriophara platyscia Lower, 1908

= Agriophara platyscia =

Species of moth

Agriophara platyscia is a moth in the family Depressariidae. It was described by Oswald Bertram Lower in 1908. It is found in Australia, where it has been recorded from Tasmania.

The wingspan is about 36 mm. The forewings are ashy-grey-whitish with a broad, more or less interrupted longitudinal shade, from the base to the apex, containing several short narrow blackish elongate streaks, those towards the termen (where the shade is darker) being especially prominent. The extreme costal edge is whitish, from before the middle to the apex. The hindwings are light greyish-fuscous.
