= Agriophara leucanthes =

Scientific classification
- Domain: Eukaryota
- Kingdom: Animalia
- Phylum: Arthropoda
- Class: Insecta
- Order: Lepidoptera
- Family: Depressariidae
- Genus: Agriophara
- Species: A. leucanthes

Binomial name
- Agriophara leucanthes Turner, 1898

Species of moth

Agriophara leucanthes is a moth in the family Depressariidae. It was described by Alfred Jefferis Turner in 1898. It is found in Australia, where it has been recorded from Queensland.

The wingspan is 14–16 mm. The forewings are whitish with pale fuscous markings. The base of the costa is fuscous and there is an obscure fascia near the base, as well as a secondly outwardly curved fascia from the costa at one-fifth to the middle of the inner margin. There is a darker spot on the costa at two-fifths and a suffused interrupted fascia from the costa at three-fifths to the anal angle. A series of dots tends to form a third fascia from the costa at four-fifths parallel to the hindmargin to the anal angle. The hindwings are whitish-grey.
