= Agriophara lysimacha =

Scientific classification
- Domain: Eukaryota
- Kingdom: Animalia
- Phylum: Arthropoda
- Class: Insecta
- Order: Lepidoptera
- Family: Depressariidae
- Genus: Agriophara
- Species: A. lysimacha

Binomial name
- Agriophara lysimacha Meyrick, 1915

Species of moth

Agriophara lysimacha is a moth in the family Depressariidae. It was described by Edward Meyrick in 1915. It is found in New Guinea.

The wingspan is about 19 mm. The forewings are pale whitish-ochreous with a very small dark fuscous mark on the base of the costa, and a dot on the fold near the base, as well as a very indistinct oblique series of scattered dark fuscous scales and suffused marks from one-fifth of the costa to a black dot representing the plical stigma. The second discal stigma is black and there is a cloudy dark fuscous spot on the middle of the costa, where an indistinct cloudy fuscous shade runs to the dorsum at three-fifths, strongly curved outwards around the second discal stigma. There is a strongly curved fuscous line interrupted on the veins from three-fourths of the costa to the tornus. There is also a terminal series of fuscous dots. The hindwings are whitish.
