= Agriophara hyalinota =

Scientific classification
- Domain: Eukaryota
- Kingdom: Animalia
- Phylum: Arthropoda
- Class: Insecta
- Order: Lepidoptera
- Family: Depressariidae
- Genus: Agriophara
- Species: A. hyalinota

Binomial name
- Agriophara hyalinota Lower, 1899

Species of moth

Agriophara hyalinota is a moth in the family Depressariidae. It was described by Oswald Bertram Lower in 1899. It is found in Australia, where it has been recorded from South Australia and Queensland.

The wingspan is 36–40 mm. The forewings are pale ashy-grey with the extreme costal edge ochreous-whitish. There is a suffused fuscous spot at one-third of the inner margin and a large blackish dot at the end of the cell, as well as an irregular fuscous dot in the disc, at one-third from the base. There is also a row of rather ill-defined fuscous spots, from beneath the costa in the middle, curved around the apex, along the hindmargin to the anal angle. The hindwings are pale ochreous in males and greyish-ochreous in females, somewhat infuscated around the apex and hindmargin.
