= Agriophara musicolor =

Scientific classification
- Kingdom: Animalia
- Phylum: Arthropoda
- Class: Insecta
- Order: Lepidoptera
- Family: Depressariidae
- Genus: Agriophara
- Species: A. musicolor

Binomial name
- Agriophara musicolor Meyrick, 1930

Species of moth

Agriophara musicolor is a moth in the family Depressariidae. It was described by Edward Meyrick in 1930. It is found in New Guinea.

The wingspan is 23–24 mm.
