= Agriophara salinaria =

Scientific classification
- Kingdom: Animalia
- Phylum: Arthropoda
- Class: Insecta
- Order: Lepidoptera
- Family: Depressariidae
- Genus: Agriophara
- Species: A. salinaria

Binomial name
- Agriophara salinaria Meyrick, 1931

Species of moth

Agriophara salinaria is a moth in the family Depressariidae. It was described by Edward Meyrick in 1931. It is found on the Solomon Islands.
