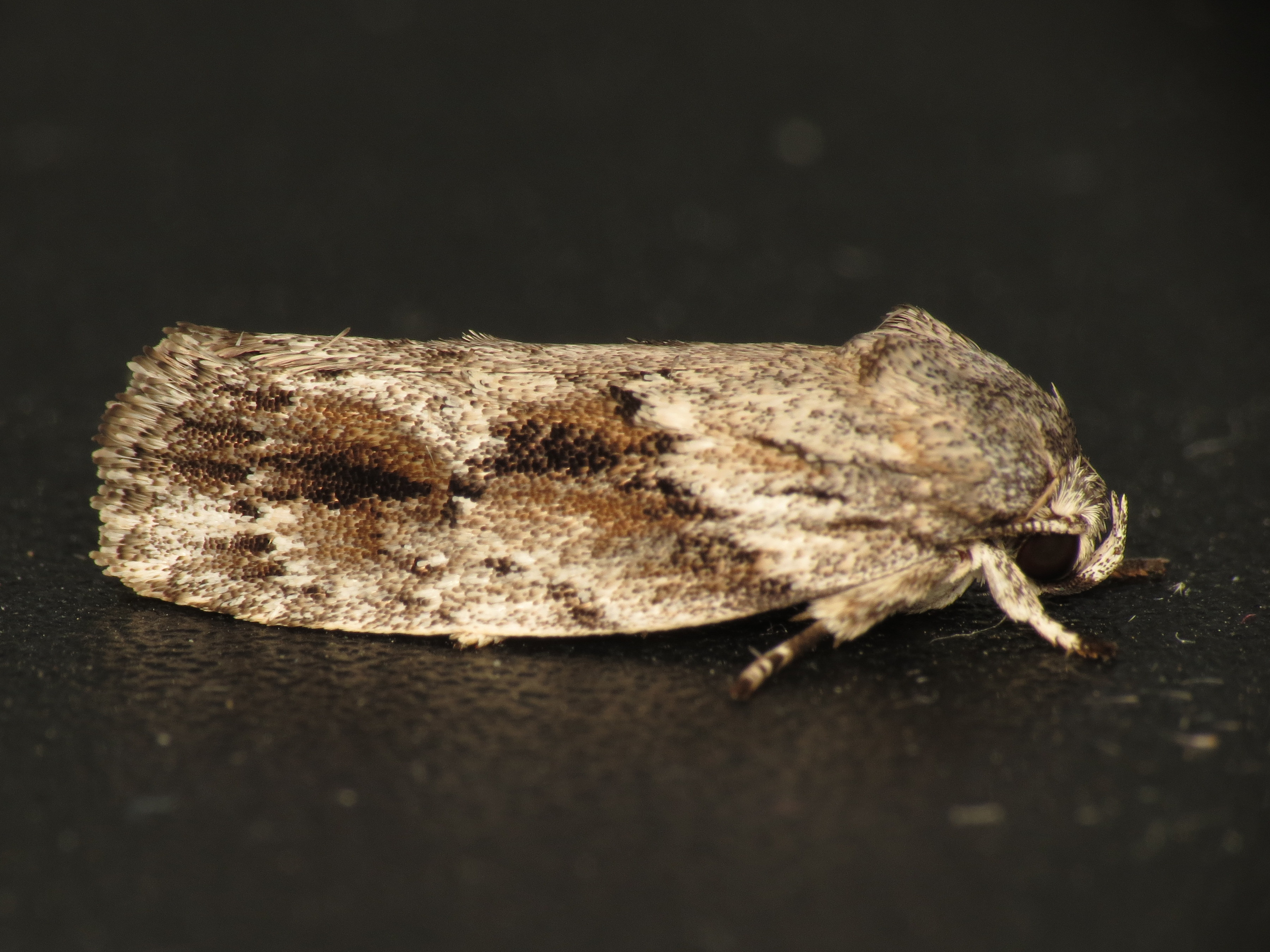

Scientific classification
- Kingdom: Animalia
- Phylum: Arthropoda
- Class: Insecta
- Order: Lepidoptera
- Family: Depressariidae
- Genus: Agriophara
- Species: A. confertella

Binomial name
- Agriophara confertella (Walker, 1864)

Synonyms
- Cryptolechia confertella Walker, 1864

= Agriophara confertella =

Species of moth

Agriophara confertella is a moth in the family Depressariidae. It was described by Francis Walker in 1864. It is found in Australia, where it has been recorded from Queensland, New South Wales and the Australian Capital Territory.

The wingspan is about 27 mm. The forewings are whitish, partially tinged with pale grey, and finely irrorated (speckled) throughout with blackish. There is a brown oblique fascia-like spot from the costa about one-third, somewhat dilated downwards, reaching to below the middle of the disc, containing a blackish suffusion towards its lower extremity. A roundish-brown blotch is found in the disc about three-fourths, including a longitudinal suffused blackish streak, and confluent posteriorly with a smaller brown blotch on the middle of the hindmargin. There is a sinuate fuscous line from the middle of the costa to the centre of the blotch at three-fourths and an ill-defined blackish-fuscous denticulate line from two-thirds of the costa to the inner margin before the anal angle, very strongly curved outwards so as to approach the margin throughout, followed on the costa by two or three small spots of brownish suffusion. The hindwings are fuscous, somewhat lighter anteriorly.
