= Agriophara discobola =

Scientific classification
- Domain: Eukaryota
- Kingdom: Animalia
- Phylum: Arthropoda
- Class: Insecta
- Order: Lepidoptera
- Family: Depressariidae
- Genus: Agriophara
- Species: A. discobola

Binomial name
- Agriophara discobola Turner, 1898

Species of moth

Agriophara discobola is a moth in the family Depressariidae. It was described by Alfred Jefferis Turner in 1898. It is found in Australia, where it has been recorded from Victoria.

The wingspan is 25–28 mm. The forewings are whitish densely irrorated with grey, and with some blackish scales. There is a well-marked irregular streak from the base of the costa along the fold to beyond the middle of the disc, immediately beyond this is a circular brownish spot in the disc at two-thirds, edged posteriorly with blackish and an oblique interrupted line from the costa at one-fourth to the central streak, as well as another more obscure from the costa at two-fifths. There is a circularly curved row of blackish dots in the disc beyond the brownish spot. The hindwings are dark-grey.
