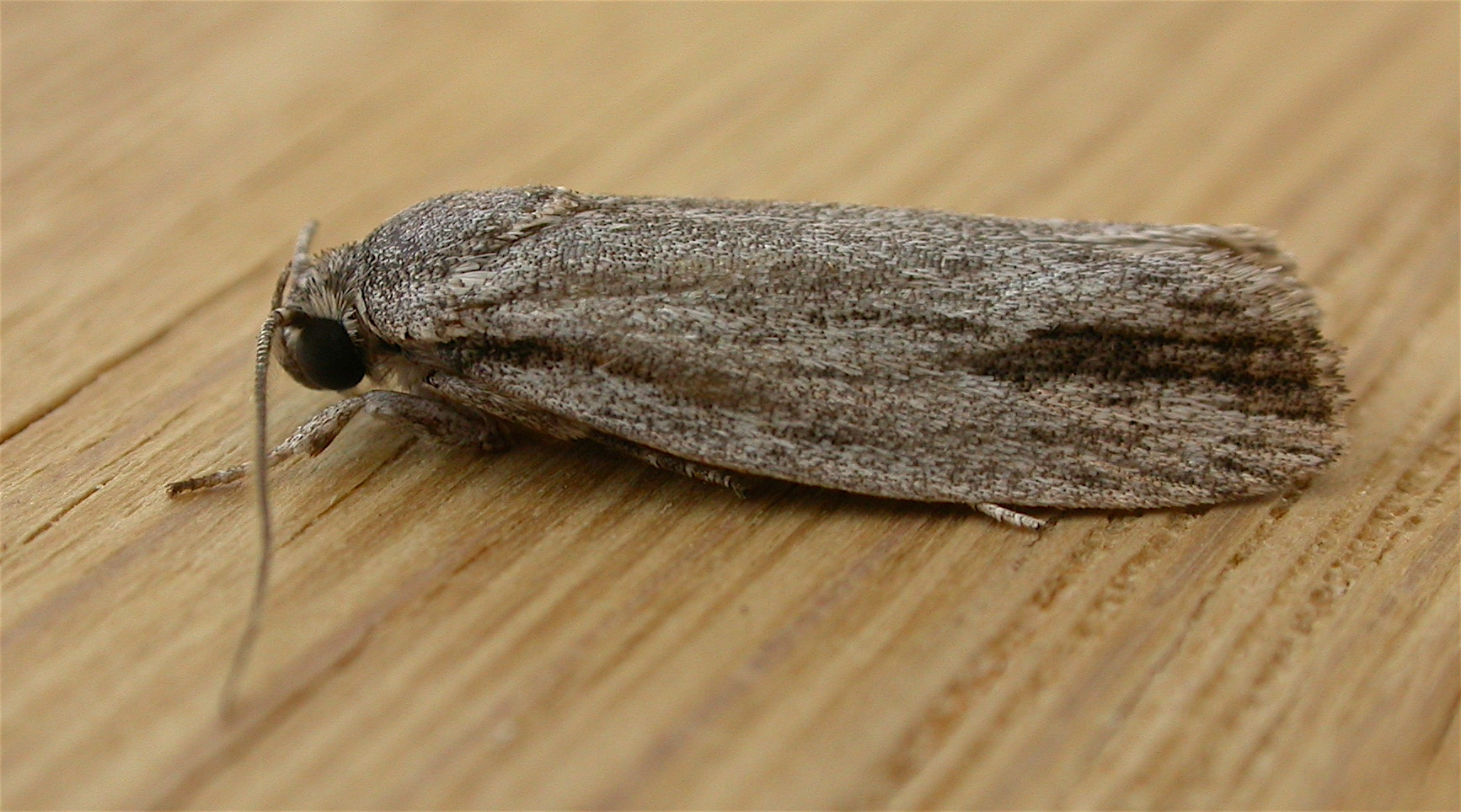

Scientific classification
- Kingdom: Animalia
- Phylum: Arthropoda
- Class: Insecta
- Order: Lepidoptera
- Family: Depressariidae
- Genus: Agriophara
- Species: A. gravis

Binomial name
- Agriophara gravis Meyrick, 1890

= Agriophara gravis =

Species of moth

Agriophara gravis is a moth of the family Depressariidae. It is found in Australia, where it has been recorded from New South Wales and Tasmania.

The wingspan is 26–27 mm. The forewings are fuscous-grey, densely irrorated with white and with some short streaks of blackish scales on the veins in the disc and towards the hindmargin, the latter forming a strongly curved transverse series. There is a blackish dot in the disc before two-thirds and a dark fuscous suffused spot immediately beyond this, and a smaller one on the middle of the hindmargin, nearly confluent. The hindwings are fuscous-grey, lighter anteriorly.
