= Agriophara neoxanta =

Scientific classification
- Kingdom: Animalia
- Phylum: Arthropoda
- Class: Insecta
- Order: Lepidoptera
- Family: Depressariidae
- Genus: Agriophara
- Species: A. neoxanta

Binomial name
- Agriophara neoxanta Meyrick, 1915

Species of moth

Agriophara neoxanta is a moth in the family Depressariidae. It was described by Edward Meyrick in 1915. It is found in New Guinea and Australia, where it has been recorded from Queensland.

The wingspan is about 17 mm for males and 23 mm for females. The forewings are white, with a few scattered fuscous scales and with small dark fuscous spots on the costa at the base, one-fourth, and the middle. The stigmata are raised and dark fuscous, the plical rather obliquely beyond the first discal, an additional dot beneath and somewhat before the second discal and there is an irregular fuscous and dark fuscous spot above the tornus. A curved subterminal series of small cloudy fuscous spots with some dark fuscous scales is found from four-fifths of the costa to the tornus and there is a series of fuscous dots sprinkled with dark fuscous around the posterior part of the costa and termen. The hindwings are pale whitish-grey.
