= Agriophara leucosta =

Scientific classification
- Domain: Eukaryota
- Kingdom: Animalia
- Phylum: Arthropoda
- Class: Insecta
- Order: Lepidoptera
- Family: Depressariidae
- Genus: Agriophara
- Species: A. leucosta

Binomial name
- Agriophara leucosta Lower, 1893

Species of moth

Agriophara leucosta is a moth in the family Depressariidae. It was described by Oswald Bertram Lower in 1893. It is found in Australia, where it has been recorded from South Australia.

The wingspan is 24–27 mm. The forewings are ashy-grey-whitish and the costal edge snow-white throughout, as well as a faint short oblique blackish streak from the costa at one-fourth, and another similar before the middle. There is an indistinct longitudinal streak from near the base to above the anal angle and a curved series of faint blackish dots from the costa at three-fourths to the anal angle parallel to hind margin. The hindwings are grey, darker in females.
