= Agriophara murinella =

Scientific classification
- Kingdom: Animalia
- Phylum: Arthropoda
- Class: Insecta
- Order: Lepidoptera
- Family: Depressariidae
- Genus: Agriophara
- Species: A. murinella

Binomial name
- Agriophara murinella (Walker, 1864)

Synonyms
- Cryptolechia murinella Walker, 1864

Species of moth

Agriophara murinella is a moth in the family Depressariidae. It was described by Francis Walker in 1864. It is found in Australia.

Adults are mouse coloured, with the wings elongate and slightly rounded at the tips. The forewings are without markings and the exterior border is slightly convex and very oblique.
