= Agriophara plagiosema =

Scientific classification
- Domain: Eukaryota
- Kingdom: Animalia
- Phylum: Arthropoda
- Class: Insecta
- Order: Lepidoptera
- Family: Depressariidae
- Genus: Agriophara
- Species: A. plagiosema

Binomial name
- Agriophara plagiosema (Turner, 1898)

Synonyms
- Agriopheara plagiosema Turner, 1898

Species of moth

Agriophara plagiosema is a moth in the family Depressariidae. It was described by Alfred Jefferis Turner in 1898. It is found in Australia, where it has been recorded from Queensland.

The wingspan is 16–18 mm. The forewings are whitish, irrorated with grey and with a few blackish scales. The markings are blackish and there is a very short oblique streak from the base of the costa and a conspicuous oblique fascia from the costa at one-third to the middle of the inner margin, often partly obsolete towards either margin. A short oblique streak is found from the middle of the costa, sometimes continued by a series of dots to a blackish suffusion above the anal angle, which is, however, frequently obsolete. There is a series of dots parallel to the hindmargin, frequently partly obsolete. The hindwings are grey.
