= Agriophara coricopa =

Scientific classification
- Kingdom: Animalia
- Phylum: Arthropoda
- Class: Insecta
- Order: Lepidoptera
- Family: Depressariidae
- Genus: Agriophara
- Species: A. coricopa

Binomial name
- Agriophara coricopa (Meyrick, 1897)

Synonyms
- Hypeuryntis coricopa Meyrick, 1897

Species of moth

Agriophara coricopa is a moth in the family Depressariidae. It was described by Edward Meyrick in 1897. It is found in New Zealand.

The wingspan is about 28 mm. The forewings are whitish-ochreous, with a few scattered dark fuscous scales. The second discal stigma is minute and blackish. There is an angulated line of dark fuscous dots rather near and parallel to the termen. The hindwings are dull whitish.

In 1988 J. S. Dugdale synonymised this species with Agriophara colligatella.
