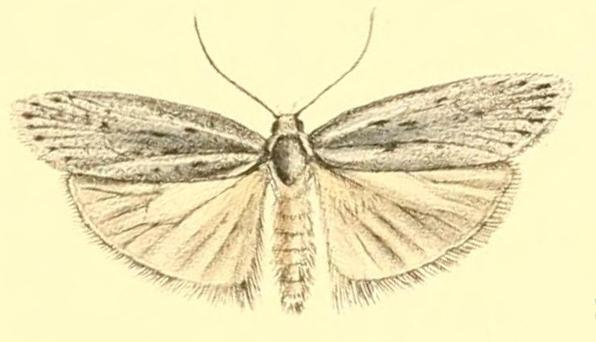

Scientific classification
- Kingdom: Animalia
- Phylum: Arthropoda
- Clade: Pancrustacea
- Class: Insecta
- Order: Lepidoptera
- Family: Depressariidae
- Genus: Agriophara
- Species: A. cinderella

Binomial name
- Agriophara cinderella (Newman, 1856)

Synonyms
- Chimabacche cinderella Newman, 1856

= Agriophara cinderella =

Species of moth

Agriophara cinderella is a moth that belongs to the family Depressariidae. Described by Newman in 1856, it was found in Australia—native specifically in Victoria and New South Wales.

The moth has a wingspan of about 35 mm. Its forewings are ashy-grey, irrigated with black. The disc in its wings comes with several short black streaks. There is a curved series of lunate blackish spots near the hind margin and a hind-marginal row of black dots. Its hind wings are paler grey.
