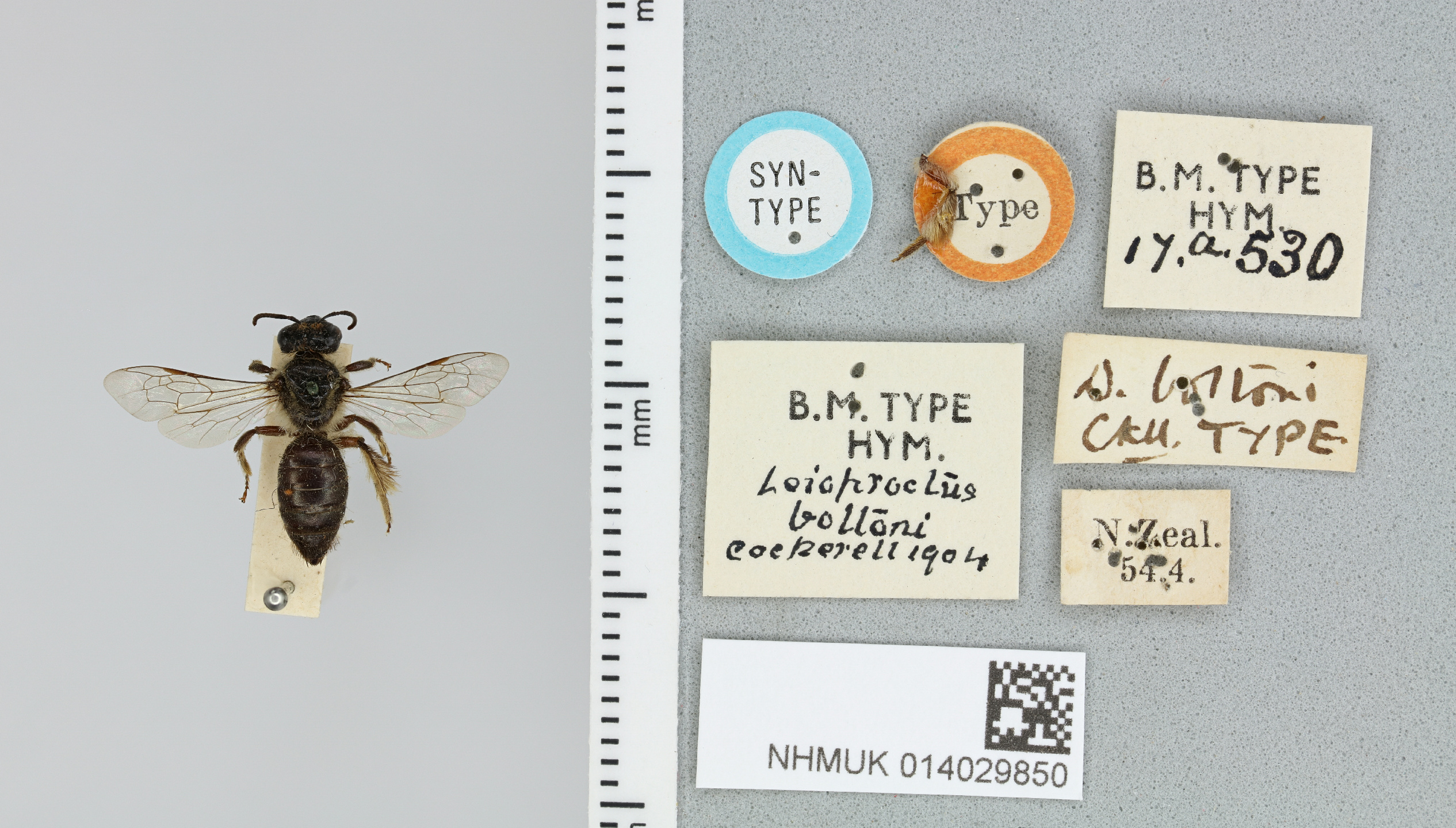

Scientific classification
- Kingdom: Animalia
- Phylum: Arthropoda
- Class: Insecta
- Order: Hymenoptera
- Family: Colletidae
- Genus: Leioproctus
- Species: L. boltoni

Binomial name
- Leioproctus boltoni Cockerell, 1904

= Leioproctus boltoni =

Species of bee

Leioproctus boltoni is a species of bee in the family of plasterer bees. This species was first described in 1904 and is endemic to New Zealand. They are a solitary bee, small and black in appearance. L. boltoni can be found throughout the main islands of New Zealand and forages on the flowers of both native and introduced species of plants. This species nests in the soil with their life cycle lasting approximately a year.

== Taxonomy ==
L. boltoni was first described by Theodore Dru Alison Cockerell in 1904 using specimens collected by Lt Col Daniel Bolton, RE, in New Zealand in 1854. The syntype specimen is held at the Natural History Museum, London.

== Description ==
L. boltoni is solitary mining bee. Adults are between 7.7 and 11.8 millimetres long. Females are more robust than males. Both the female and male are similarly coloured, but the head of female generally has 12 antennal segments while the male has 13. All adults are black, with an orthognathous head. The bee's pronotum is fixed to the mesothorax, the pronotal lobe covers the spiracle and is not connected with the tegula. The mesosoma includes all parts of thoracic and first true abdominal segment, as the first real abdominal part is connected to the metathorax. This species has a short tongue and has enlarged ocelli. Females have an external pollen-carrying apparatus (the scopa) and in summer they can often be seen carrying pollen.

The larvae of the species is easily differentiated from the adults, as larvae have a white or almost white body and are without legs. The obvious character of pupae is that their surface colour progresses from pearly white to black as they grow. The colour results from mature features gradually developing under the pupal skin.

== Distribution ==
=== Natural global range ===
L. boltoni is endemic to New Zealand.

=== New Zealand range ===
This species is widely distributed and can be found in the North, South, Stewart and Three Kings Islands. Large aggregations are commonly seen in rural areas such as at Maungatapere. The species' preferred habitat is diverse including native forests such as at Raumanga Valley Reserve, regenerative forests such as at Mount Parihaka, and areas with pine, shrub or gorse growth. Canterbury also is a common location for finding L boltoni.

== Habitat preferences ==
A preferred habitat requires enough food resources and suitable substrates for nesting. For L. boltoni, their preferred habitats include forest undergrowth, underneath grass, silts and sand or shell beaches. In terms of nesting, factors such as the type of soil and amount sunshine are important. The substrate must be dry and free draining, to avoid flooding. In addition, the loose soil is needed for filling in tunnels in their nests. Females dig tunnels and cells in clear ground with enough nearby vegetation, in cliff surfaces, coastal areas and in silt in river beds.

== Life cycle and phenology ==
All nutrients that they need in their life are directly or indirectly come from pollen and nectar. More specific, pollen is the main source of protein, nectar provides sugar. The task of collecting pollen and nectar to provision their nests is only undertaken by females. Males spend most of their time in mating, eating and resting.

Reproduction and seasonal rhythms

Adult bees appear in spring or early summer between September and December. Then female mates and lays approximately 30 eggs once a year. Females begin to construct a nest in mid-late summer. Although L. boltoni is a solitary bee, their nests are often close to one another. Males play no role in constructing nests as only females build the nest which consist of blind tunnels and cells where their larvae live in. Females also protect the nest against enemies. After building the cells, the female fills them full of nectar and then lays eggs in the cell. She will then close the tunnel. After about three days the larvae hatch from the eggs with the young growing rapidly with the mature larvae continuing to overwinter within the nest. Lastly prepupae and pupae are no longer to eat until they become adults the following spring.

Life expectancy

The species lives for approximately one year, with the adults dying in the fall.

== Diet, prey and predators ==
Diet and foraging

Food : L. boltoni forages mainly on the flowers of native species of Asteraceae, Myrtaceae, and Fabaceae. This species has also adapted to foraging on the flowers of introduced plants and crops such as kiwifruit and onions. They also often visit white clover florets.

Foraging behaviors : The foraging preference of this species is influenced by how close the plants are to nest sites. The bees prefer to forage near their nests, mainly to limit their foraging time. The average foraging time is about two minutes but can range from between 46 seconds and four minutes and 28 seconds.

== Predators, parasites and diseases ==
L. boltoni has been found to be carrying different species of mites. The spore cyst fungus Ascosphaera scaccaria can attack larvae and prepupae in their nests. In addition, a gasteruptiid in the Pseudomonas genus likely attacks L. boltoni.

== Load-lifting capacity ==
Knowledge about bee load-lifting capacity can help assess the foraging range of the species, which in turn can contribute to developing conservation strategies. Experiments in the load-lifting capacity of L. boltoni show that this species can carry the maximal load of approximately 52% of their body weight. Although those experiments have succeeded in getting results, those results were influenced by the behaviour of the bees experimented on. The test subjects tried to remove additional loads during the experiment. The reason for the bees behaving this way is still unknown.

== Nesting behaviour ==
The sites chosen for nesting by L. boltoni is affected by the type of soil and the aspect of the site. Female bees have been observed waiting at the entry of their nests, possibly for the temperature to rise, before leaving the nest. It has been hypothesised that the insects need for warmer temperatures is the reason why nests are placed in sunny areas. When it is a suitable temperature for the female bee to leave the nest, they walk around their nest three or four times. They then fly around the nest in a figure eight shape, then finally leave the area of the nest to forage.
