= Agriophara horridula =

Scientific classification
- Kingdom: Animalia
- Phylum: Arthropoda
- Class: Insecta
- Order: Lepidoptera
- Family: Depressariidae
- Genus: Agriophara
- Species: A. horridula

Binomial name
- Agriophara horridula Meyrick, 1890

Species of moth

Agriophara horridula is a moth in the family Depressariidae. It was described by Edward Meyrick in 1890. It is found in Australia, where it has been recorded from New South Wales.

The wingspan is about 18 mm. The forewings are whitish-ochreous, densely irrorated with light fuscous and whitish and with an oblique transverse bar of raised scales in the disc at two-fifths, and a direct similar bar at two-thirds, as well as an indistinct fuscous streak from the costa at one-fourth to the apex of the first bar, and another from the middle of the costa to the apex of the second. There is a short fuscous dash in the disc beneath the middle and a strongly curved series of small subconfluent fuscous spots from the costa beyond the middle to the anal angle. The hindwings are ochreous-whitish, posteriorly slightly fuscous-tinged.
