= Agriophara poliopepla =

Scientific classification
- Kingdom: Animalia
- Phylum: Arthropoda
- Clade: Pancrustacea
- Class: Insecta
- Order: Lepidoptera
- Family: Depressariidae
- Genus: Agriophara
- Species: A. poliopepla

Binomial name
- Agriophara poliopepla Turner, 1898

Species of moth

Agriophara poliopepla is a moth in the family Depressariidae. It was described by Alfred Jefferis Turner in 1898. It is found in Australia, where it has been recorded from Queensland.

The wingspan is 16–22 mm. The forewings are grey densely irrorated with whitish scales. The markings are grey and rather obscure and there is a dot on the costa at one-fourth, from which proceeds an outwardly oblique series of dots, the last on the fold. There is a dot on the costa at two-fifths, from which extends a second outwardly oblique series of dots ending in a larger dot in the disc at two-thirds. A third series of dots is found from the costa at three-fifths, parallel to the hindmargin to before the anal angle. The hindwings are whitish-grey.
