= Agriophara fascifera =

Scientific classification
- Kingdom: Animalia
- Phylum: Arthropoda
- Class: Insecta
- Order: Lepidoptera
- Family: Depressariidae
- Genus: Agriophara
- Species: A. fascifera

Binomial name
- Agriophara fascifera Meyrick, 1890

Species of moth

Agriophara fascifera is a moth in the family Depressariidae. It was described by Edward Meyrick in 1890. It is found in Australia, where it has been recorded from New South Wales.

The wingspan is 13–14 mm. The forewings are white, finely irrorated with black and coarsely with fuscous, tending to form short longitudinal streaks. There is a faintly defined somewhat darker streak from the middle of the costa very obliquely outwards to four-fifths of the disc, then acutely angulated and continued to the middle of the inner margin. A series of small dark longitudinal marks is found from two-thirds of the costa very obliquely outwards to near the apex, then curved around near the hindmargin to the anal angle. The hindwings in males are whitish, semitransparent, and towards the apex grey. In females, they are grey, paler and thinly scaled anteriorly.
