= Agriophara polistis =

Scientific classification
- Domain: Eukaryota
- Kingdom: Animalia
- Phylum: Arthropoda
- Class: Insecta
- Order: Lepidoptera
- Family: Depressariidae
- Genus: Agriophara
- Species: A. polistis

Binomial name
- Agriophara polistis (Lower, 1923)

Synonyms
- Eulechria polistis Lower, 1923

Species of moth

Agriophara polistis is a moth in the family Depressariidae. It was described by Oswald Bertram Lower in 1923. It is found in Australia, where it has been recorded from New South Wales.

The wingspan is about 25 mm. The forewings are dull white, faintly suffused with pale fuscous and with three irregular, oblique, pale-fuscous fasciae, reaching more than half way across the wing. The first from the costa at one-sixth, the second from the costa at about one-fourth, the third from the costa in the middle and reaching to above the tornus. There are six dark-fuscous equidistant costal dots, the first at the commencement of the third fascia and the sixth at the apex. From the fifth dot is emitted a fine, waved, fuscous line of suffused dots, the line indented below the costa and terminating at the tornus. There are two fine fuscous dots at the posterior end of the cell, one above the other. The hindwings are pale whitish fuscous, darker on the apical portion.
