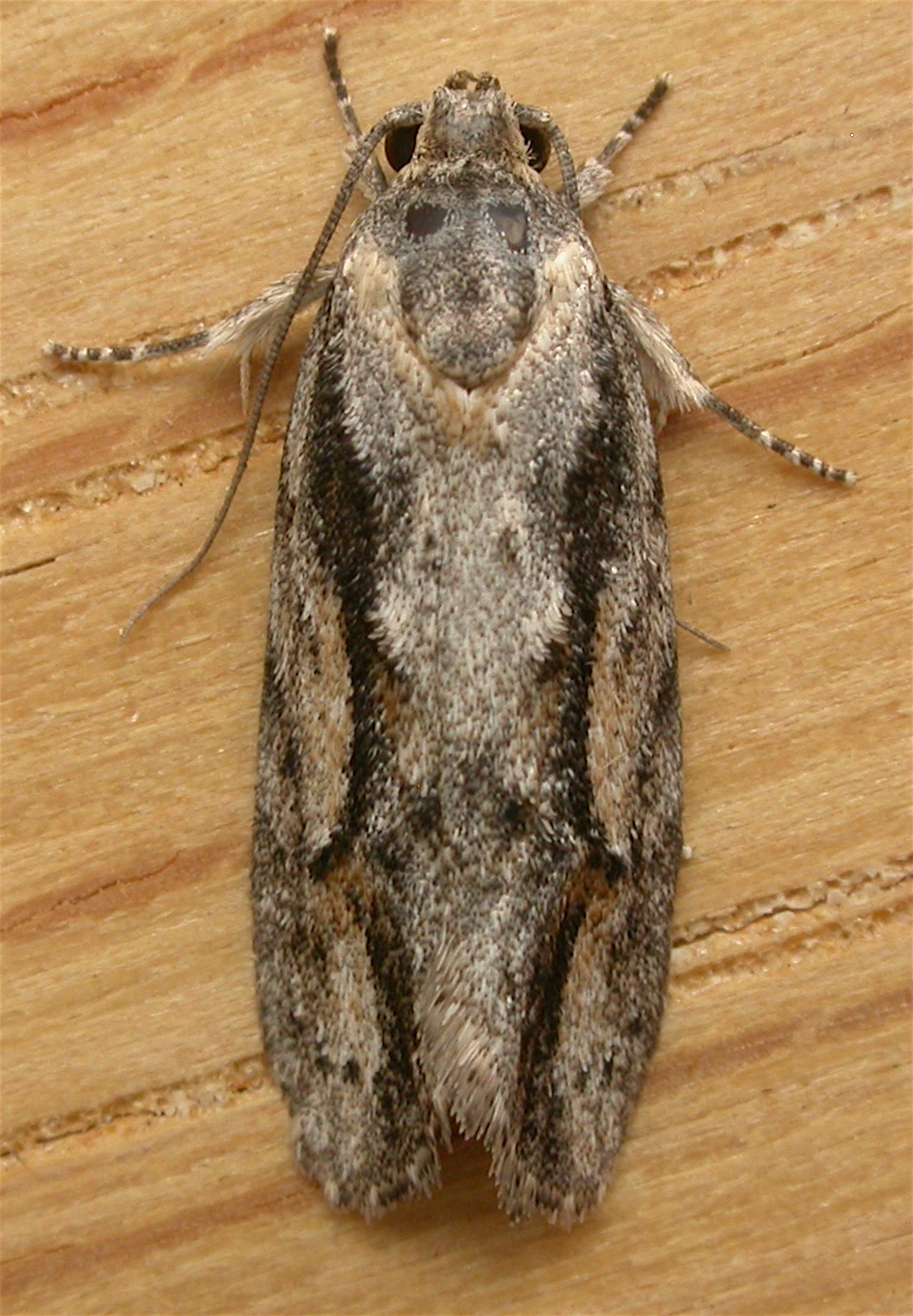

Scientific classification
- Domain: Eukaryota
- Kingdom: Animalia
- Phylum: Arthropoda
- Class: Insecta
- Order: Lepidoptera
- Family: Depressariidae
- Genus: Agriophara
- Species: A. leptosemela

Binomial name
- Agriophara leptosemela Lower, 1893

= Agriophara leptosemela =

Species of moth

Agriophara leptosemela is a moth of the family Depressariidae. It is found in Australia, where it has been recorded from South Australia, the Australian Capital Territory, New South Wales and Queensland.

The wingspan is about 18 mm. The forewings are ashy-grey, with well-defined black markings. The veins tend to be streaked with blackish and there is a suffused spot on the costa at about one-third and another similar on the costa before the middle, both indicating unexpressed fasciae. There is a slender line from the base of the costa to the anal angle. Another similar one is placed immediately beneath, but not reaching the base or the anal angle, and a third similar streak is found from the base to near the anal angle, terminating in a suffused patch of scales. A suffused dot is found midway in the disc near the termination of the first line and resting on its upper extremity. There is a rather thick suffused streak at the termination of the first streak to below the middle of the hindmargin. A few scattered black scales are found above and below this. The hindwings are whitish-grey, darker posteriorly.
