= Agriophara tephroptera =

Scientific classification
- Domain: Eukaryota
- Kingdom: Animalia
- Phylum: Arthropoda
- Class: Insecta
- Order: Lepidoptera
- Family: Depressariidae
- Genus: Agriophara
- Species: A. tephroptera

Binomial name
- Agriophara tephroptera Lower, 1903

Species of moth

Agriophara tephroptera is a moth in the family Depressariidae. It was described by Oswald Bertram Lower in 1903. It is found in Australia, where it has been recorded from New South Wales.

The wingspan is about 28 mm. The forewings are cinereous-grey with the extreme costal edge white from one-third to the apex, more pronounced beneath. There are four rather oblique outwards curved series of transverse fuscous marks, the first from one-fourth of the costa to one-fourth of the dorsum, the second from the costa at about one-third to about the middle of the dorsum, the third from the costa at three-fifths to the anal angle and the fourth more strongly curved and better developed, from the costa at three-fourths to the anal angle and there meeting the third. There is an interrupted blackish line along the termen. The hindwings are pale ochreous-whitish, somewhat fuscous tinged.
