= Agriophara parallela =

Scientific classification
- Domain: Eukaryota
- Kingdom: Animalia
- Phylum: Arthropoda
- Class: Insecta
- Order: Lepidoptera
- Family: Depressariidae
- Genus: Agriophara
- Species: A. parallela

Binomial name
- Agriophara parallela Diakonoff, 1954

Species of moth

Agriophara parallela is a moth in the family Depressariidae. It was described by Alexey Diakonoff in 1954. It is found in New Guinea.
