= Bainbrigg =

Bainbrigg is a surname. Notable people with the surname include:

- Reginald Bainbrigg (1545–1606), English schoolmaster and antiquary
- Thomas Bainbrigg (died 1646), English college head
- Thomas Bainbrigg (controversialist) (1636–1703), English Protestant controversialist
