= Agriophara diminuta =

Scientific classification
- Kingdom: Animalia
- Phylum: Arthropoda
- Class: Insecta
- Order: Lepidoptera
- Family: Depressariidae
- Genus: Agriophara
- Species: A. diminuta

Binomial name
- Agriophara diminuta Rosenstock, 1885

Species of moth

Agriophara diminuta is a moth in the Depressariidae family. It was described by Rudolph Rosenstock in 1885 and is found in Australia, specifically recorded from South Australia and Tasmania.

The wingspan of the moth ranges from 16 to 18 mm.The fuscous-grey forewings are irrorated with whitish and have a short blackish dash beneath the costa near the base and another on the submedian fold at one-thirdThere are three transverse series of obscure marks formed by a blackish irroration. The first series is straight, extending from one-fourth of the costa to three-fourths of the inner margin. The second series starts from the middle of the costa, extends obliquely outwards to three-fourths of the disc, then angles sharply to the middle of the inner margin, crossing the first series along the fold.The third series is found starting at three-fifths of the costa, extending obliquely outward towards the apex, then curving around near the hind margin to the anal angle. The hindwings are grey, somewhat darker towards the apex.

The second series starts from the middle of the costa, extends obliquely outwards to three-fourths of the disc, then angles sharply to the middle of the inner margin, crossing the first series along the fold
