= Agriophara atratella =

Scientific classification
- Kingdom: Animalia
- Phylum: Arthropoda
- Class: Insecta
- Order: Lepidoptera
- Family: Depressariidae
- Genus: Agriophara
- Species: A. atratella

Binomial name
- Agriophara atratella (Walker, 1866)

Synonyms
- Acrobasis atratella Walker, 1866

Species of moth

Agriophara atratella is a moth in the family Depressariidae. It was described by Francis Walker in 1866. It is found in Australia, where it has been recorded from Queensland and New South Wales.

The wingspan is 15–19 mm. The forewings are dark fuscous, somewhat purple shining, with a few scattered whitish-grey scales. The disc is irregularly mixed with black, tending to form short streaks on the veins. There is a very minute, sometimes obsolete, whitish dot in the disc at two-thirds. There is a series of indistinct blackish spots beneath the costa from one-fourth to near the apex, then curved around near the hindmargin to the anal angle. The hindwings are light grey.
