= Agriophara neurometra =

Scientific classification
- Domain: Eukaryota
- Kingdom: Animalia
- Phylum: Arthropoda
- Class: Insecta
- Order: Lepidoptera
- Family: Depressariidae
- Genus: Agriophara
- Species: A. neurometra

Binomial name
- Agriophara neurometra (Meyrick, 1926)

Synonyms
- Hypeuryntis neurometra Meyrick, 1926

Species of moth

Agriophara neurometra is a moth in the family Depressariidae. It was described by Edward Meyrick in 1926. It is found on Borneo.

The wingspan is about 28 mm. The forewings are white irregularly sprinkled brown with the markings brown, partially suffused dark grey. There is some suffusion on the base of the costa and a slender streak beneath the middle from near the base to the first line. There are three ill-defined or interrupted oblique transverse lines rising from the small costal marks, the first nearly straight, from before one-third of the costa to the middle of the dorsum, the second from the costa before the middle strongly excurved in the disc around the small second discal stigma and returning to the dorsum at two-thirds, the third from the costa at two-thirds strongly excurved to the dorsum before the tornus. The veins towards the costa are posteriorly marked with short dark grey lines. The hindwings are pale grey.
