= Agriophara cremnopis =

Scientific classification
- Domain: Eukaryota
- Kingdom: Animalia
- Phylum: Arthropoda
- Class: Insecta
- Order: Lepidoptera
- Family: Depressariidae
- Genus: Agriophara
- Species: A. cremnopis

Binomial name
- Agriophara cremnopis Lower, 1894

Species of moth

Agriophara cremnopis is a moth in the family Depressariidae. It was described by Oswald Bertram Lower in 1894. It is found in Australia, where it has been recorded from Queensland.

The wingspan is about 26 mm. The forewings are black, with two fine irregular, hardly perceptible, blacker lines, anteriorly edged with a few whitish scales. There is a row of black dots from below the middle of the costa, continued in a curve around to the anal angle, the anterior three edged anteriorly somewhat with whitish. A row of very small whitish dots on the costa from the middle to the middle of hindmargin, obscured on the hindmargin. The hindwings are grey, suffused with pale fuscous posteriorly.
