= Agriophara velitata =

Scientific classification
- Domain: Eukaryota
- Kingdom: Animalia
- Phylum: Arthropoda
- Class: Insecta
- Order: Lepidoptera
- Family: Depressariidae
- Genus: Agriophara
- Species: A. velitata

Binomial name
- Agriophara velitata (T. P. Lucas, 1900)

Synonyms
- Lichenaula velitata T. P. Lucas, 1900; Lichenaula dirigens T. P. Lucas, 1900

Species of moth

Agriophara velitata is a moth in the family Depressariidae. It was described by Thomas Pennington Lucas in 1900. It is found in Australia, where it has been recorded from Queensland.

The wingspan is 22–24 mm. The hindmargin of the forewings is chalky white, sparsely dusted with light grey, and sparingly but generally dotted with black and diffused smoky grey dots. There is a fine black line along the basal fourth of the costa and a black dot in the centre of the base, with a linear one almost touching, and a third beyond in the centre of the wing. A line on the costa at one-eighths forms the base of an oblique line of fine dots. There is a dagger-like line, in the middle of the wing nearer the inner than the costal margin, and extended in the diffused specks and dots to the anal angle of the hind margin. There is also a dot at one-half of the costa, with a dot, and, after an interruption, a line of dots, a comma dot, and a line of diffused spaces and dots to the anal angle of the hindmargin. The apical third of the costa is irregularly studded with diffused lines and dots more or less faintly marked. Scattered diffused dots are found near the hindmargin. The hindwings are light smoky grey.
