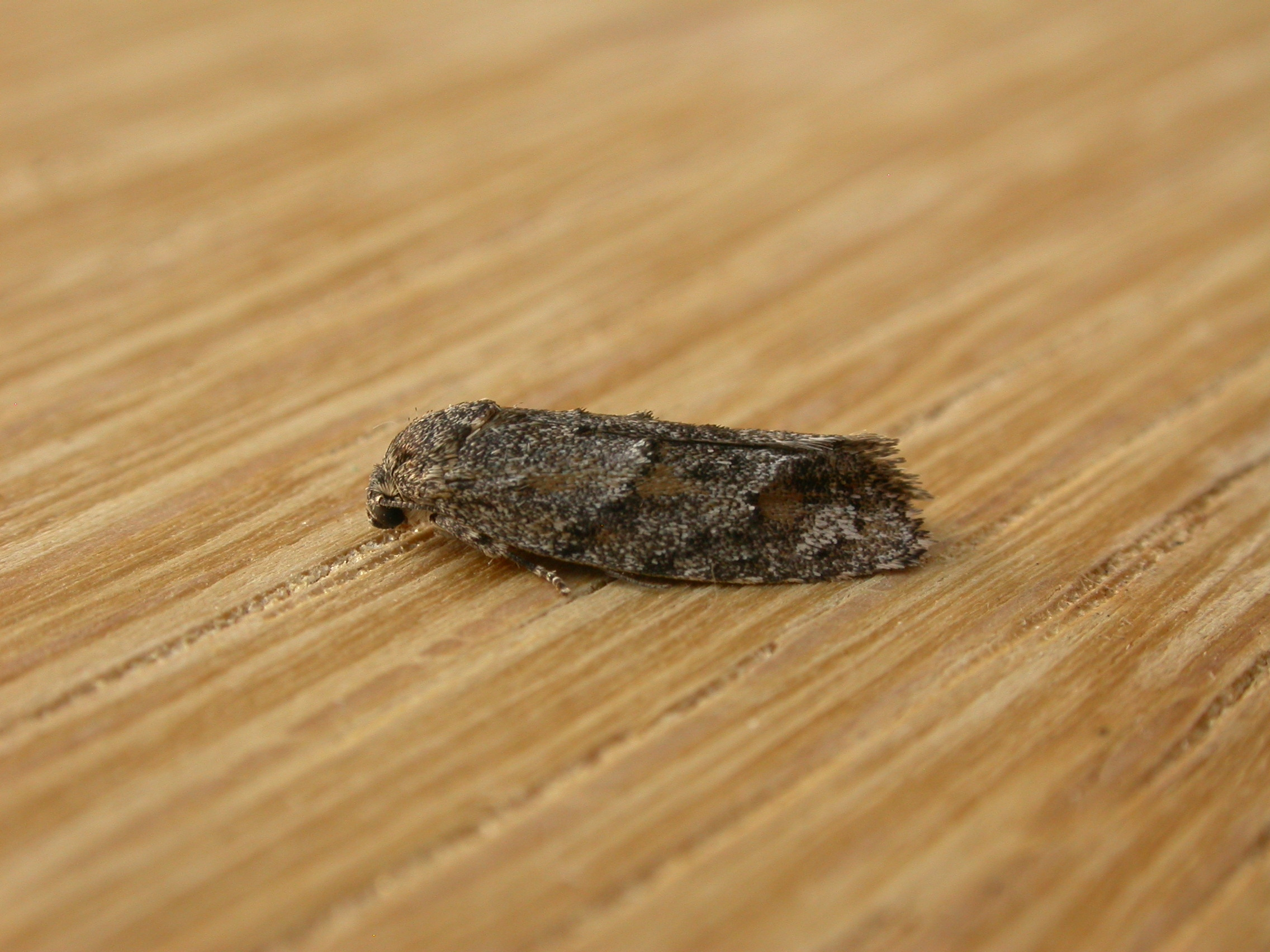

Scientific classification
- Domain: Eukaryota
- Kingdom: Animalia
- Phylum: Arthropoda
- Class: Insecta
- Order: Lepidoptera
- Family: Depressariidae
- Genus: Agriophara
- Species: A. nodigera

Binomial name
- Agriophara nodigera Turner, 1900

= Agriophara nodigera =

Species of moth

Agriophara nodigera is a moth of the family Depressariidae. It is found in Australia, where it has been recorded from Queensland.

The wingspan is about 18 mm. The forewings are whitish, densely irrorated with dark fuscous and with roundish raised tufts of blackish scales and three in a line from beneath the costa at one-sixth to above the inner-margin at one-third, three or four in an oblique line from the costa at one-third to above the middle of the inner-margin. Just outside this is an ochreous-brown spot in the disc before the middle and there is a more obscure curved line of raised dots from the costa at one-half to above and before the anal angle. Just beyond this is an ochreous-brown spot in the disc at two-thirds and there is a very obscure series of dots parallel to the hindmargin, not raised. The hindwings are fuscous-grey.
