= Agriophara cinerosa =

Scientific classification
- Domain: Eukaryota
- Kingdom: Animalia
- Phylum: Arthropoda
- Class: Insecta
- Order: Lepidoptera
- Family: Depressariidae
- Genus: Agriophara
- Species: A. cinerosa

Binomial name
- Agriophara cinerosa Rosenstock, 1885

Species of moth

Agriophara cinerosa is a moth in the family Depressariidae. It was described by Rudolph Rosenstock in 1885. It is found in Australia, where it has been recorded from Queensland, New South Wales, Victoria and South Australia.

The wingspan is 20–22 mm. The forewings are fuscous, densely irregularly irrorated with white and black and with an indistinct blackish short very oblique streak from the base of the costa. There are two very obscure oblique darker streaks from the costa at one-third and the middle. There is a very obscure ill-defined darker longitudinal streak in the disc below the middle from the base to the hindmargin, finely attenuated anteriorly, obscurely interrupted at two-thirds. Above the interruption is an obscure white dot, followed by black scales. The hindwings are light fuscous-grey, darker towards the apex.
