= Agriophara curta =

Scientific classification
- Domain: Eukaryota
- Kingdom: Animalia
- Phylum: Arthropoda
- Class: Insecta
- Order: Lepidoptera
- Family: Depressariidae
- Genus: Agriophara
- Species: A. curta

Binomial name
- Agriophara curta (T. P. Lucas, 1900)

Synonyms
- Agriophora curta T. P. Lucas, 1900

Species of moth

Agriophara curta is a moth in the family Depressariidae. It was described by Thomas Pennington Lucas in 1900. It is found in Australia, where it has been recorded from Queensland.

The wingspan is about 15 mm. The hindmargin of the forewings is white, diffused with grey, with fuscous shading and fine black lines and dots. The costal line is fuscous, a black line of dots from the base of the costa for a short distance along the median and a longitudinal fuscous suffusion with black lines irregularly scattered, nearer the inner margin than to the costa. There is an outward semicircle of black dots at three-fourths of the inner margin to the median, this is continued along the inner and parallel with the hindmargin to three-fourths of the costa, a curved diffused fuscous line with black dots from one third of the costa to the middle of the longitudinal median band. The hindmarginal line is fuscous. The hindwings are whitish grey, with the veins darker grey.
