= John Sperling (British Army officer) =

British Army officer (1793–1877)

- Born: 4 November 1793; Tottenham, Middlesex
- Died: 13 February 1877 (aged 83); Kensington, London
- Spouse: Harriet Hanson (m. 1819)
- Children: John Sperling (1825–1894)
- Military career
- Allegiance: United Kingdom
- Branch: Board of Ordnance
- Service years: 1811–1824
- Rank: Lieutenant
- Service number: 457
- Unit: Corps of Royal Engineers
- Conflicts: Napoleonic Wars; War of the Sixth Coalition; Siege of Antwerp; Siege of Bergen-op-Zoom; War of the Seventh Coalition; Battle of Waterloo

Lieutenant John Sperling (1793–1877) was an English military engineer of the Corps of Royal Engineers, Board of Ordnance.

== Life ==
=== Origins ===
John Sperling, son of Henry Piper Sperling of Park Place, Henley-on-Thames, and afterwards of Norbury Park, Surrey, by Sarah Ann, his wife (died 28 May 1850), daughter of Henry Grace of Tottenham, Middlesex, was born at Tottenham on 4 November 1793. After passing through the Royal Military Academy at Woolwich, and spending some time in the Ordnance Survey of Great Britain, Sperling received a commission as second lieutenant in the Royal Engineers on 14 December 1811. He joined his corps at Chatham in March 1812, and was promoted to be first lieutenant on 1 July 1812.

=== War of the Sixth Coalition ===
In December 1813 Sperling embarked at Ramsgate with the expedition under Sir Thomas Graham (afterwards Lord Lynedoch), to assist the Dutch against the French, whose garrisons had been recently much reduced in strength. He was one of nine officers of Royal Engineers under the Commanding Royal Engineer Lieutenant-colonel (afterwards Lieutenant-general Sir) James Carmichael Smyth. They landed at Williamstadt on 18 December. On 31 December Sperling was at Staandaarhuyten making a bridge of boats, and in the early part of January 1814 he restored a tête-de-pont which protected the passage of the river. On 11 January 1814 Sperling, with his sappers, was attached to a column sent to assist the Prussians in dislodging the French from Hoogstraaten.

==== Siege of Antwerp ====
Sperling went to Breda on 21 January to arrange for accommodating a store depôt for the bombardment of Antwerp. On 2 February he advanced his engineer stores to Merxem, and during the night commenced the construction of a mortar battery, which was armed and opened fire on Antwerp on the afternoon of the 3rd. He did duty in the trenches until the 6th, when the siege was raised. The British troops went into cantonments, and Sperling, after taking his engineer stores to Breda, was sent to Tholen, in the neighbourhood of Bergen-op-Zoom, to report on the fortifications there.

==== Siege of Bergen-op-Zoom ====
On 8 March an attempt was made to storm Bergen-op-Zoom with four columns. Headed by Sperling, No. 1 storming column effected an entrance by surprise at the watergate and seized the guard, the French officer surrendering his sword to Sperling, who kept it as a trophy. The party then swept the ramparts for some way, but not being supported by the main body of their own, and encountering a large force of the enemy, it was obliged to fall back after the death of its two commanders, Carleton and Gore. In the course of this operation it came across the second column under Major-general Cooke, and together they made a stand for the night. When the day dawned it should have been possible to take Bergen-op-Zoom; but, instead of support, came an order to retire. The master-general of the board of ordnance conveyed to Sperling 'a particular approbation of the gallantry and ability shown by him while attached to the advanced party which entered the fortress'.

On 23 March Sperling was appointed adjutant and quartermaster of the sappers and miners, and he accordingly joined headquarters at Calmthout. But on 11 April news arrived of the entrance of the allies into Paris, and of the change of government, upon which hostilities at once ceased.

==== Peacetime operations ====
Sperling moved with army headquarters to St. Graven Wesel on 18 April, and during May was employed in preparations for taking possession of the fortresses assigned to British occupation by the convention. He also visited all the Scheldt defences. As soon as Antwerp was handed over, British headquarters were moved thither. On 7 June Sperling was sent to London to lay before the board of ordnance plans and reports of the fortresses. He returned to Antwerp on 8 July. In August he made a survey and plan of Liège citadel for Lord Lynedoch, who was vacating the command, the Prince of Orange succeeding him. On 10 September he removed with headquarters to Brussels, and in October reconnoitred ground which the Prince of Orange considered a good position for an army in advance of Brussels.

=== War of the Seventh Coalition ===
When the news of Napoleon's escape from Elba arrived (9 March 1815), Sperling's work became very heavy. In April he visited Ghent in regard to the defence works for the permanent bridge over the Scheldt. On the 21st and 22nd of that month he dined with Wellington, who, after a tour of inspection of the fortresses, expressed himself well satisfied with Sperling's preparations. On 1 May Sperling reported on the bridge of boats constructed at Boom, and then accompanied Colonel Carmichael Smyth on a tour of inspection of the works at Ghent, Oudenarde, Tournay, the pontoon bridge over the Scheldt at Escanaffles, with its tête-de-pont at Ath. A sketch which he made of the position at Hal for defence against an invading army was laid before Wellington on the 17th, who at once sent him to Antwerp to meet Sir David Dundas and conduct him over Bergen-op-Zoom.

==== Battle of Waterloo ====
On 15 June the French crossed the frontier, and on the 16th all the troops in Brussels were in motion. Sperling joined Colonel Carmichael Smyth on the 17th, and found the British army falling back after the Battle of Quatre Bras. The next day Sperling and Carmichael Smyth accompanied the Duke during the early part of the Battle of Waterloo, and after, owing to the various evolutions, they separated from Wellington, they remained until the great engagement ended, for the most part on the hill near the artillery, occasionally taking refuge in the infantry squares.

==== Aftermath ====
On 19 June Sperling returned with Smyth to Brussels, and arrived on the 24th at Le Cateau. He then moved with headquarters towards Paris. On 2 July he visited Argenteuil, Bezons, and Carrières, to report on their comparative eligibility for bridging the Seine. Argenteuil was selected, and the bridge was in progress the following day. On 7 July Sperling entered Paris with the headquarters staff. He remained in Paris until 27 January 1816, when he was moved to Cambrai.

=== Later life and death ===
Sperling returned to England in November 1818, to his beautiful paternal residence, Park Place, near Henley, was employed at Portsmouth from January 1820 to September 1821, and retired on permanent half-pay on 24 January 1824. He resided first at Great Doods, near Reigate, Surrey, and afterwards in a house which he built for himself in Palace Gardens, Kensington, London. He died at Kensington on 13 February 1877.

=== Legacy ===
Sperling married, on 12 March 1819, Harriet Hanson, by whom he had an only son, John (1825–1894).

Sperling was the author of Letters of an Officer of the Corps of Royal Engineers, from the British Army in Holland, Belgium, and France, to his Father, from the latter end of 1813 to 1816, 12mo, London, 1872. These pleasantly written letters contain a detailed diary of his life during an interesting period.
