= John Jeremiah Bigsby =

English physician and geologist (1792–1881)

John Jeremiah Bigsby FRS FGS FRGS
- Born: 14 August 1792; Nottingham
- Died: 10 February 1881 (aged 88); Portman Square, London
- Education: Edinburgh University
- Known for: Bigsby Medal
- Awards: Murchison Medal (1874)
- Scientific career
- Fields: Geology

John Jeremiah Bigsby (14 August 1792 – 10 February 1881), was an English physician who became known for his work on geology, an interest developed while on military service in Lower and Upper Canada, 1818–1826. He was a member of the American Philosophical Society (elected in 1825). Before moving to London, he was Alderman and Mayor of Newark-upon-Trent, 1827–1830. In 1850, he published a lively book recounting his life and travels in British North America, The Shoe and Canoe. In 1868, he published his most important scientific work, Thesaurus Siluricus, being a list of all the fossils which occur in the Silurian formation across the world. He contributed about twenty seven papers to various scientific societies in London. He published Thesaurus Devonico-Carboniferus but died shortly before completing Thesaurus Permianus. In 1874, he was awarded the Murchison Medal. In 1876, he endowed the Bigsby Medal.

== Early career ==
Born 1792 at Nottingham, he was the eldest son of John Bigsby (1760–1844) M.D., F.R.C.P., of Clareborough Cottage, East Retford, Nottinghamshire, and Mary (d.1821), only daughter of John Chamberlin (d.1815), J.P., of Red Hill, High Sheriff of Nottinghamshire. His brother, Thomas, lived at Retford and married a daughter of Colonel John Kirke (1777–1826), J.P., of Markham Hall and Retford. His second brother, Charles, graduated from Trinity College, Cambridge, and became a clergyman. Bigsby Road in Retford is named for his family.

Like his father, John Jeremiah Bigsby was educated at Edinburgh University where he took the degree of Doctor of Medicine in 1814. That year he published his thesis and became a physician at the Royal Infirmary of Edinburgh. In 1816, he joined the British Army as an assistant surgeon and was stationed at the Cape of Good Hope in 1817. The following year, he was appointed medical officer to a German Rifle Regiment in the English service and posted with them to British North America. He was stationed at Quebec City but was sent to Hawkesbury in Upper Canada to treat a typhus epidemic among Irish immigrants.

== Geology ==
He developed a great interest in geology and was commissioned in 1819 to report on the geology of Upper Canada. He was the first person to investigate and describe the Oak Ridges Moraine.

In 1822 he was appointed British secretary and medical officer to the Boundary Commission, and for several years he made extensive and important geological researches, contributing papers to the American Journal of Science and other scientific journals; and later embodying an account of his travels in a book entitled The Shoe and Canoe (1850).

Returning to England in 1827 he practised medicine at Newark-on-Trent until 1846 when he removed to London, where he remained until the end of his life. He now took an active interest in the Geological Society of London, of which he had been elected a fellow in 1823. In 1869 he was elected a fellow of the Royal Society, and in 1874 he was awarded the Murchison Medal by the council of the Geological Society of London. During the last twenty years of his long life he was continually at work preparing, after the most painstaking research, tabulated lists of the fossils of the Palaeozoic rocks. His Thesaurus Siluricus was published with the aid of the Royal Society in 1868; and the Thesaurus Devonico-Carboniferus in 1878. In 1877 he founded the Bigsby Medal to be awarded by the Geological Society of London, with the stipulation that the receiver should not be more than forty-five years old. He died in London on 10 February 1881.
