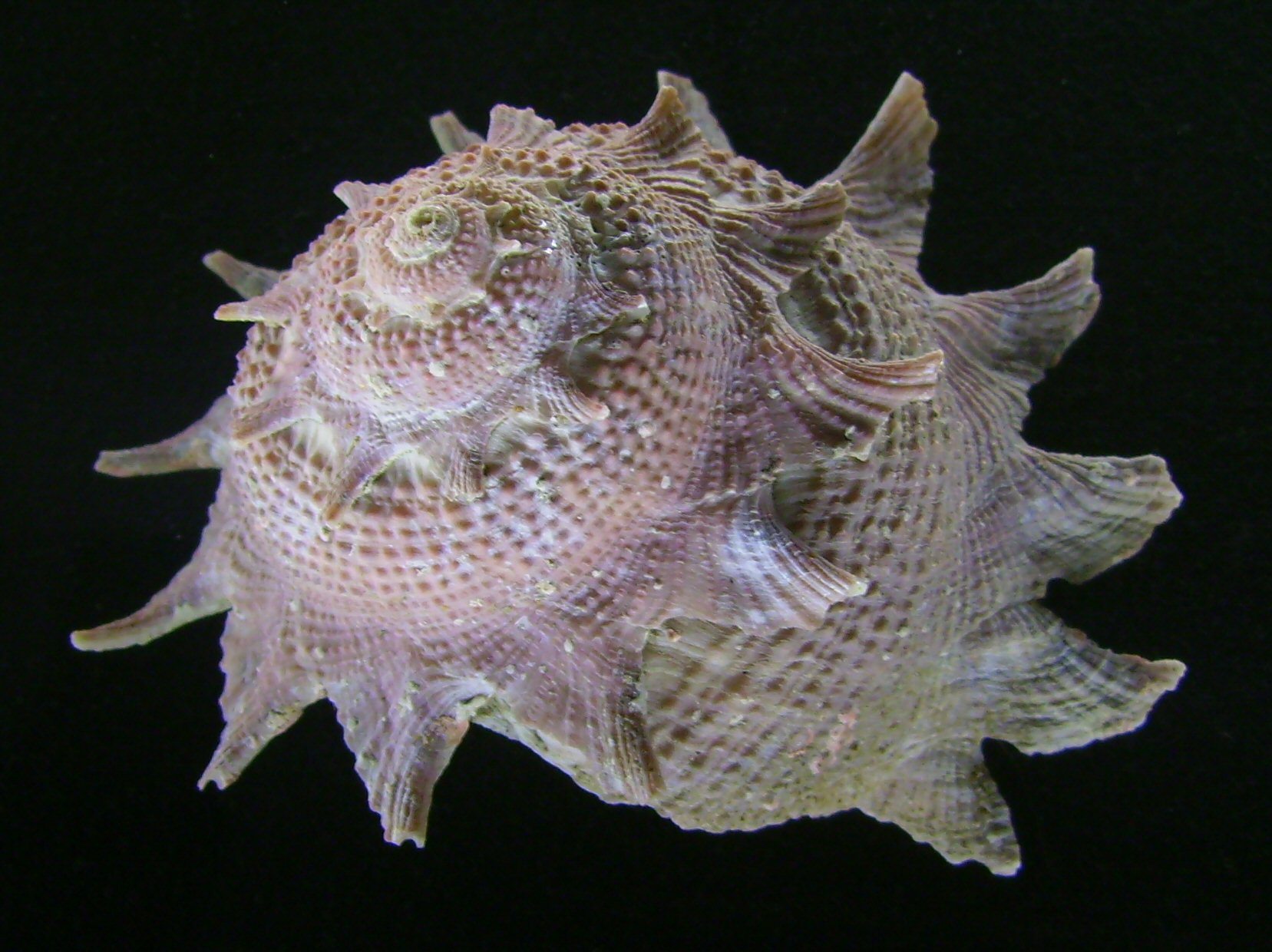

Conservation status
- Least Concern (IUCN 2.3)

- Not Threatened (NZ TCS)

Scientific classification
- Kingdom: Animalia
- Phylum: Mollusca
- Class: Gastropoda
- Subclass: Vetigastropoda
- Order: Trochida
- Family: Turbinidae
- Genus: Astraea
- Species: A. heliotropium

Binomial name
- Astraea heliotropium (Martyn, 1784)

Synonyms
- List: Astralium heliotropium (Martyn T., 1784); Guildfordia heliophorus Gray; † Imperator anthropophagus Marwick, 1928 unaccepted (junior subjective synonym); Imperator aureolatus Montfort, 1810; Liotia solitaria Suter, 1908 (junior subjective synonym); Lithopoma heliotropium (Martyn, T., 1784); Solarium radiatum Fischer von Waldheim, G., 1807; Trochus heliotropium Martyn, 1784 (basionym); Trochus imperialis Gmelin, 1791

= Astraea heliotropium =

Species of gastropod

Astraea heliotropium, common name the sunburst star turban or the circular saw shell, is a large, heavy, spirally coiled sea snail with peripheral spines, a marine gastropod mollusc of the family Turbinidae, the turbans and star snails.

This large species was brought to Europe for the first time by the famous Captain Cook.

== Shell description ==
The height of the shell is up to 60 mm, and the width is up to 120 mm. The large shell has a depressed-conic shape. Below widely it is umbilicate and concave. The spire is dome-shaped, and consists of 5 convex whorls. The suture is rendered zigzag by the prominent compressed triangular recurved vaulted spines which arm the acutely carinated periphery. The whorls above and below contain numerous spiral series of granules. The wide umbilicus is deep, and coarsely obliquely striate within. The aperture is transversely oval, oblique, pearly within. The peristome is continuous. The columella is slightly dilated, impinging upon the umbilicus. The color pattern is brownish or purplish above, light below.

== Distribution ==
This marine species is endemic to New Zealand.
