= Philip John Bainbrigge =

British artist (1817–1881)

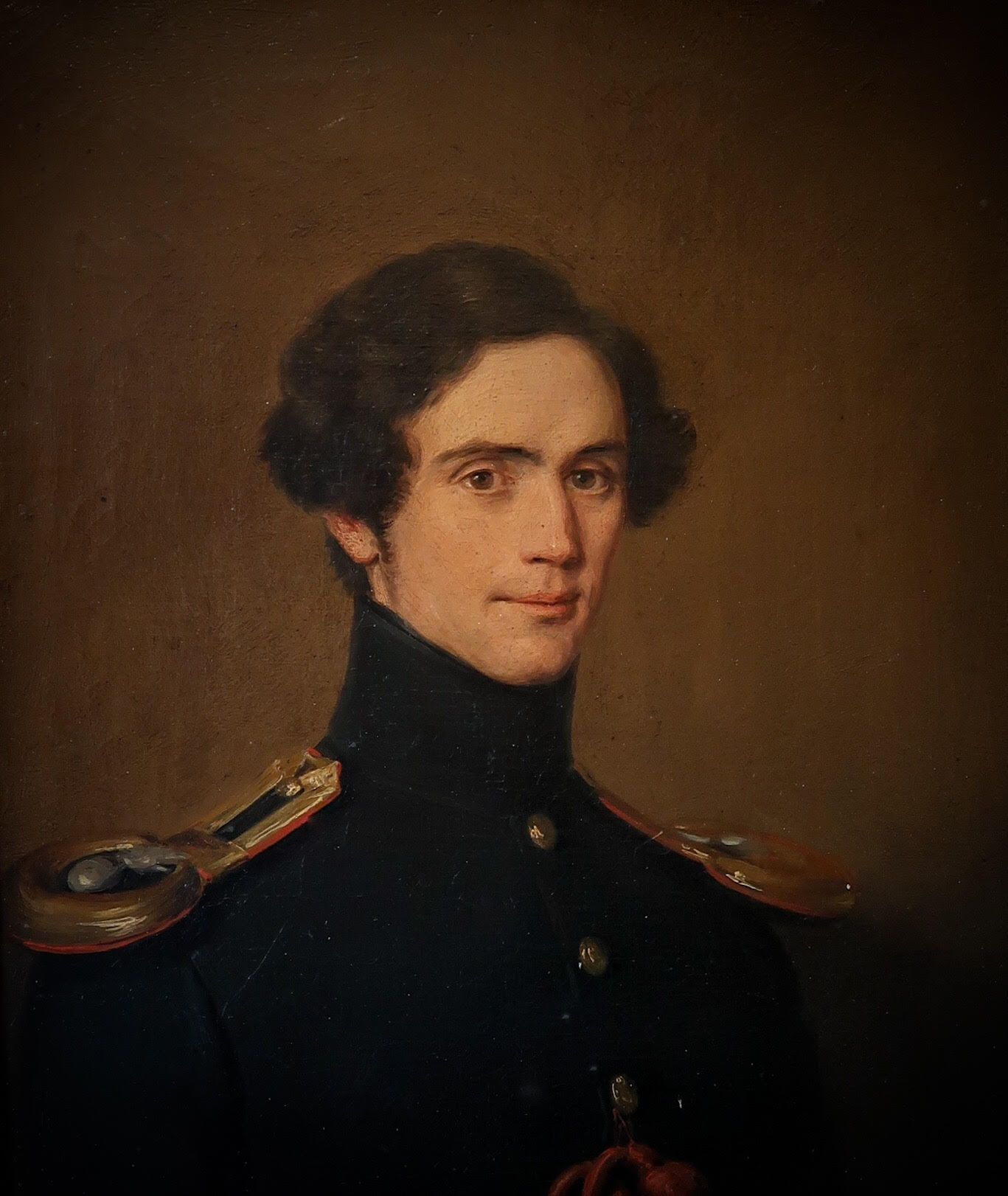
- Major General Philip John Bainbrigge, c. 1840
- Born: 1817; Lichfield, Staffordshire
- Died: 1881 (aged 63–64); Blackheath, England
- Education: Royal Military Academy at Woolwich (1830–1833)
- Known for: British military officer-painter

Philip John Bainbrigge (1817 – 1881) was a British military officer and painter who served in what was then called Upper and Lower Canada from 1836 to 1843.

== Biography ==
Bainbrigge was born at Lichfield, Staffordshire into a military family. He was trained as a military man and in art at the Royal Military Academy at Woolwich (1830–1833) and posted to Canada in 1836. He served in the Rebellions of 1837-1838.

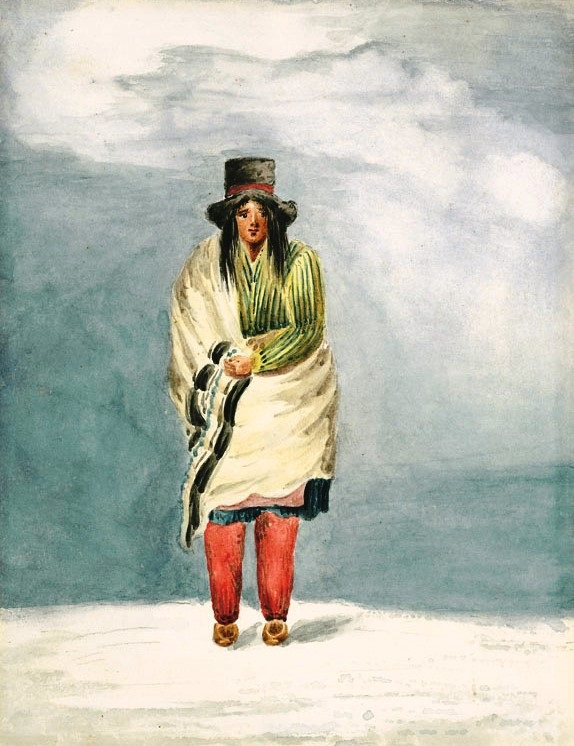
Portrait of Canadian Indian Christine Vincent by Philip Bainbrigge

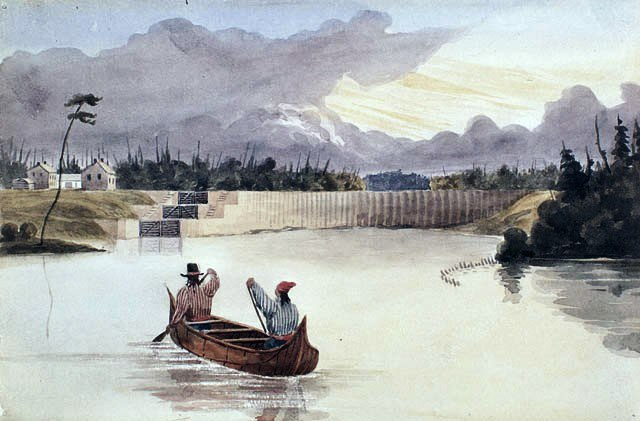
Long Island – Dam and Locks, Rideau Canal, Upper Canada, Ottawa

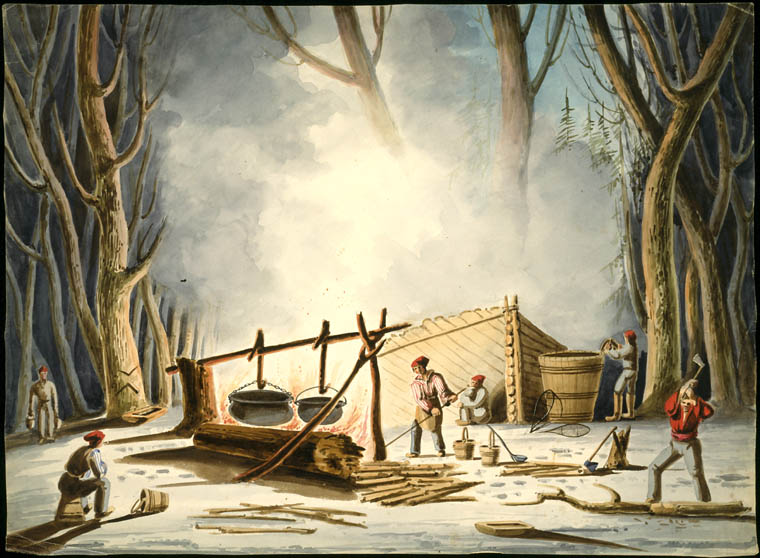
Making Maple Sugar, Lower Canada, 1837

He travelled widely in Canada as it was then, drawing and painting watercolours of which 137 along with his drawing pencil, pen and ink are in Library and Archives Canada. His subjects ranged widely from the First Nations people to scenic views, especially of fortifications and occupations such as maple sugaring, which provide a valuable record of early Canada. In 1841–1842, he was promoted to Acting Adjutant. In 1843, he returned to England where he died in 1881.

Albumen prints of Philip John Bainbrigge's father in 1862 by Camille Silvy are preserved in the Photography section of the National Portrait Gallery, London.

== Selected public collections ==
- Library and Archives Canada
- National Gallery of Canada
- Montreal Museum of Fine Arts
- Musée national des beaux-arts du Québec
- McCord Museum
- Bibliothèque nationale de France
