= Thomas Bainbrigg (controversialist) =

English controversialist

Thomas Bainbrigg (also Bambridge, Bainbridge or Bembridge) D.D. (1636–1703), was an English Protestant controversialist.

== Life ==
Bainbrigg was the son of Richard and Rose Bainbrigg, born at Cambridge. He was educated at Trinity College, Cambridge there, proceeding B.A. in 1654, M.A. in 1661. He was incorporated M.A. of Oxford in 1669, became proctor at Cambridge in 1678, there graduated D.D. by royal mandate in 1684, and held for many years the posts of fellow and vice-master of Trinity College.

Bainbrigg was sometime vicar of Chesterton and subsequently rector of Orwell. He died suddenly in Cambridge, and was buried in Trinity College Chapel, where there was a monument to his memory.

== Works ==
In 1687 Bainbrigg published An Answer to a Book entitled Reason and Authority, or the Motives of a late Protestant's Reconciliation to the Catholick Church, together with a brief account of Augustine the Monk, and conversion of the English. In a letter to a Friend. The Letter does not bear Bainbrigg's name, but is generally ascribed to him. It is an onslaught on the accredited author of Reason and Authority. The pamphlet assailed — an attack on John Tillotson's discourse against transubstantiation — was attributed to Joshua Basset, for a time master of Sidney Sussex College. Bainbrigg thinks that "it is a grief to have an adversary so weak and yet so confident." "He names Pope Gregory and Bede," he adds, "but gives not any ground to think that ever he has read over Bede's History or consulted Pope Gregory's Epistles."
