= Erechthias transfumata =

Scientific classification
- Kingdom: Animalia
- Phylum: Arthropoda
- Clade: Pancrustacea
- Class: Insecta
- Order: Lepidoptera
- Family: Tineidae
- Genus: Erechthias
- Species: E. transfumata

Binomial name
- Erechthias transfumata (Meyrick, 1915)

Synonyms
- Ereunetis transfumata Meyrick, 1915

Species of moth

Erechthias transfumata is a moth of the family Tineidae first described by Edward Meyrick in 1915. It is found in Sri Lanka.
