= E. darwini =

E. darwini may refer to:

- Enochrus darwini
- Erechthias darwini
- Eremaeozetes darwini
- Eupistella darwini

== See also ==
- E. darwinii (disambiguation)
- Darwini (disambiguation)
