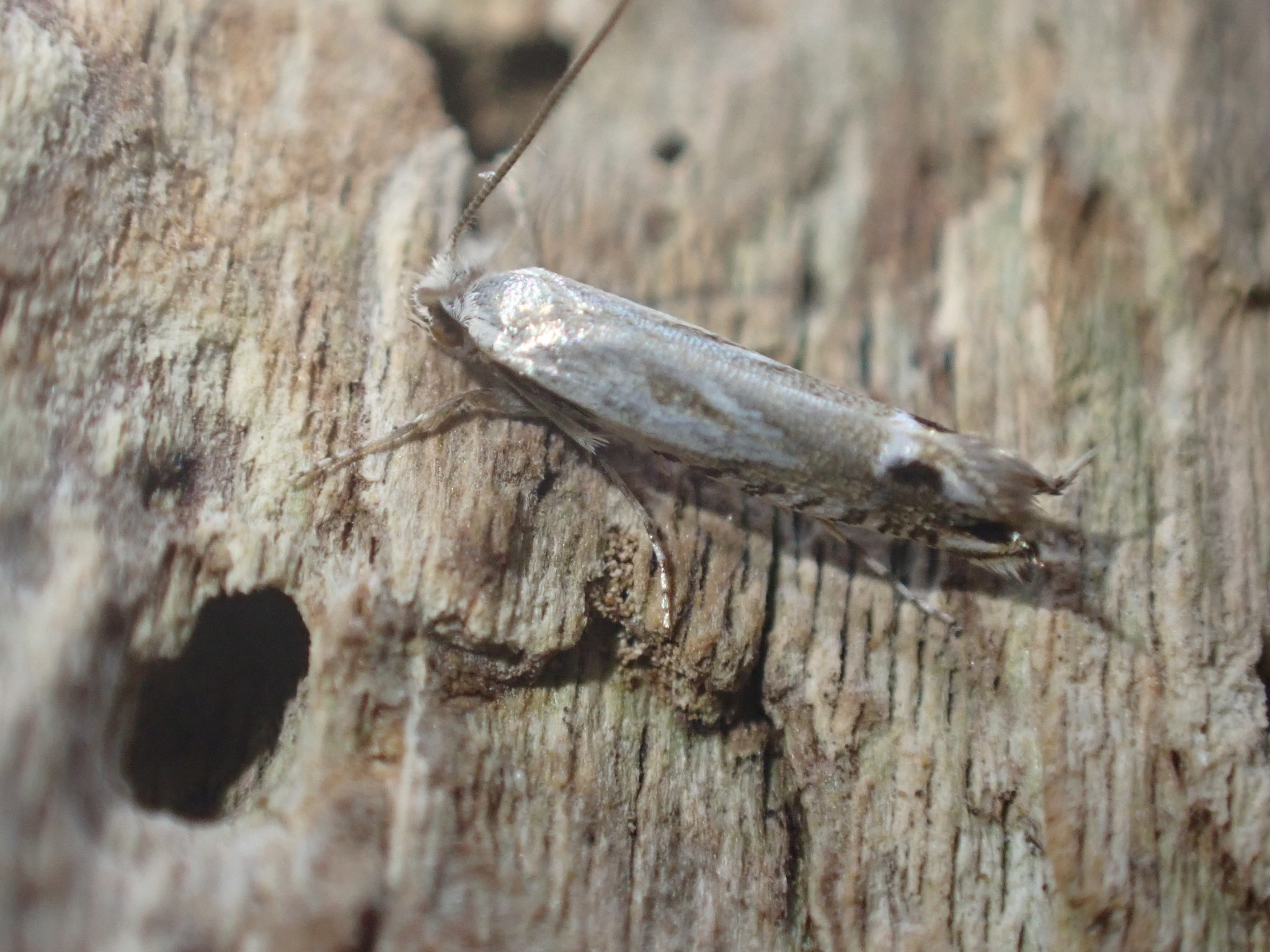

Scientific classification
- Kingdom: Animalia
- Phylum: Arthropoda
- Clade: Pancrustacea
- Class: Insecta
- Order: Lepidoptera
- Family: Tineidae
- Genus: Erechthias
- Species: E. decoranda

Binomial name
- Erechthias decoranda (Meyrick, 1925)

Synonyms
- Hectacma decoranda Meyrick, 1925

= Erechthias decoranda =

Species of moth endemic to New Zealand

Erechthias decoranda is a species of moth in the family Tineidae. It was described by Edward Meyrick in 1925. This species is endemic to New Zealand and has been observed in the Chatham Islands. Larvae of species in the genus Erechthias feed on dead plant debris or the tough leaves of plants such as palms. Adults are on the wing in October, December and March.

== Taxonomy ==
This species was first described by Edward Meyrick in 1925 using four specimens collected by Charles Lindsay at Mangere Island in the Chathams and originally named Hectacma decoranda. George Hudson discussed and illustrated this species in his 1928 book The butterflies and moths of New Zealand under that name. In 1988 John S. Dugdale synonymised Hectacma with the genus Erechthias and thus since that date this species has been known as Erechthias decoranda. However Dugdale hypothesised that as a result of various anatomical structures this species could possibly be excluded from the Erechthias genus. The male holotype is held at the Canterbury Museum.

== Description ==
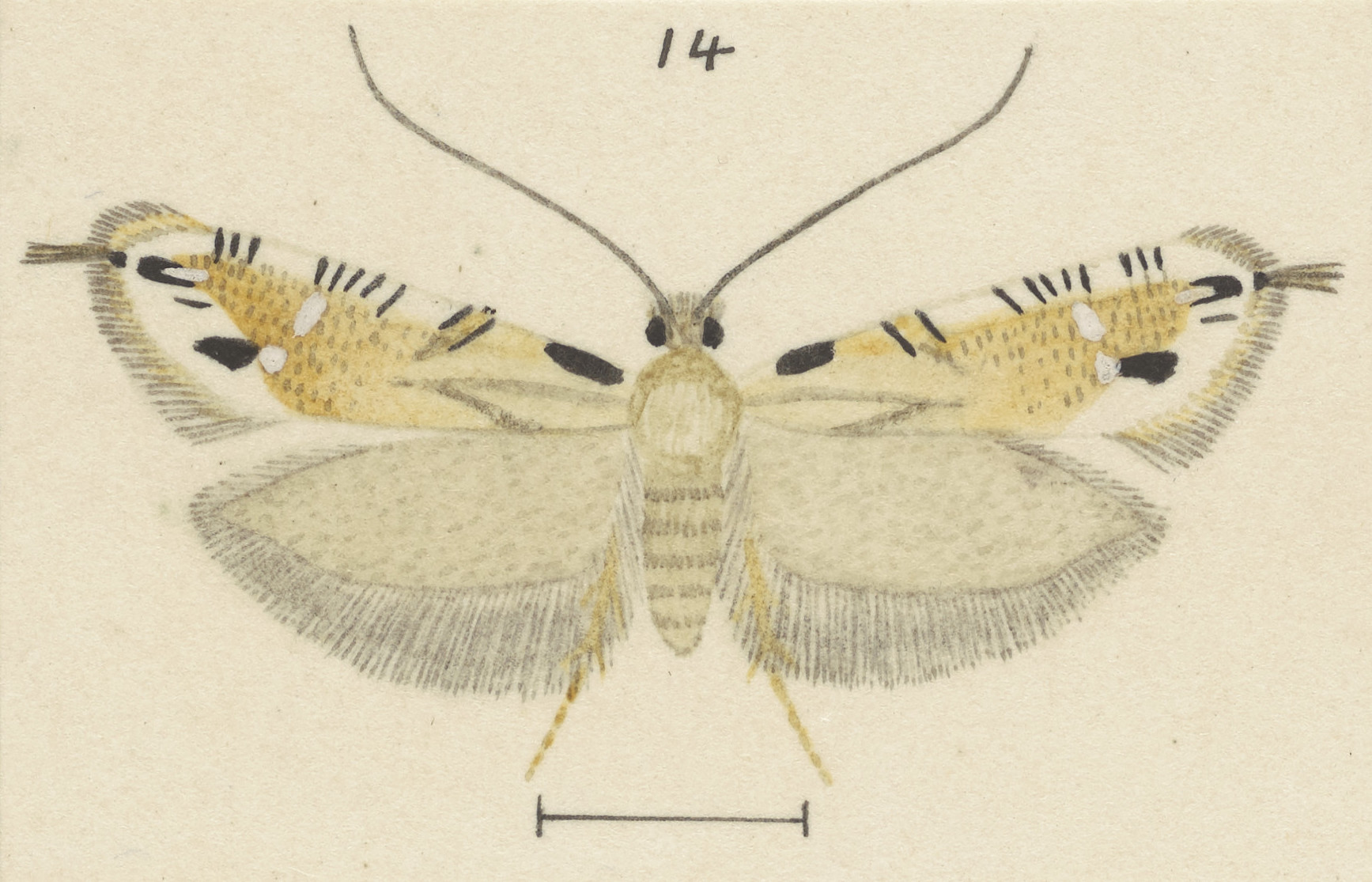
Illustration by George Hudson.

Meyrick described this species as follows:

♂♀ 10–11 mm. Head, palpi, thorax whitish, palpi slender, second joint with several lateral projecting bristles towards apex, terminal joint shorter than second, filiform. Antennae nearly as long as forewings. Forewings elongate, apex pointed, produced, termen slightly sinuate, very oblique; pale ochreous-yellowish with bases of scales grey; a large acute wedge-shaped whitish patch based on basal third of costa with apex extending to disc at 2/3, a white nearly longitudinal streak beneath posterior half of this, and separated from it by blackish; a blackish blotch along basal fifth of costa; costa from 1/3 to apex white, between 1/3 and 3/4 with about eleven black more or less oblique strigulae arranged in three irregular groups; an irregular white streak along termen, terminated above by a small black anteapical spot with an anterior projection margined beneath by a silver}/ mark, itself edged grey beneath (a fine grey line a little below this), and below middle immediately preceded by a rather larger black spot; a black apical dot; cilia light silvery grey, on costa a dark fuscous basal line towards apex, and dark fuscous projecting hook beyond it. Hind wings with 5 and 6 separate; light brassy-grey; cilia whitish-grey.

== Distribution ==
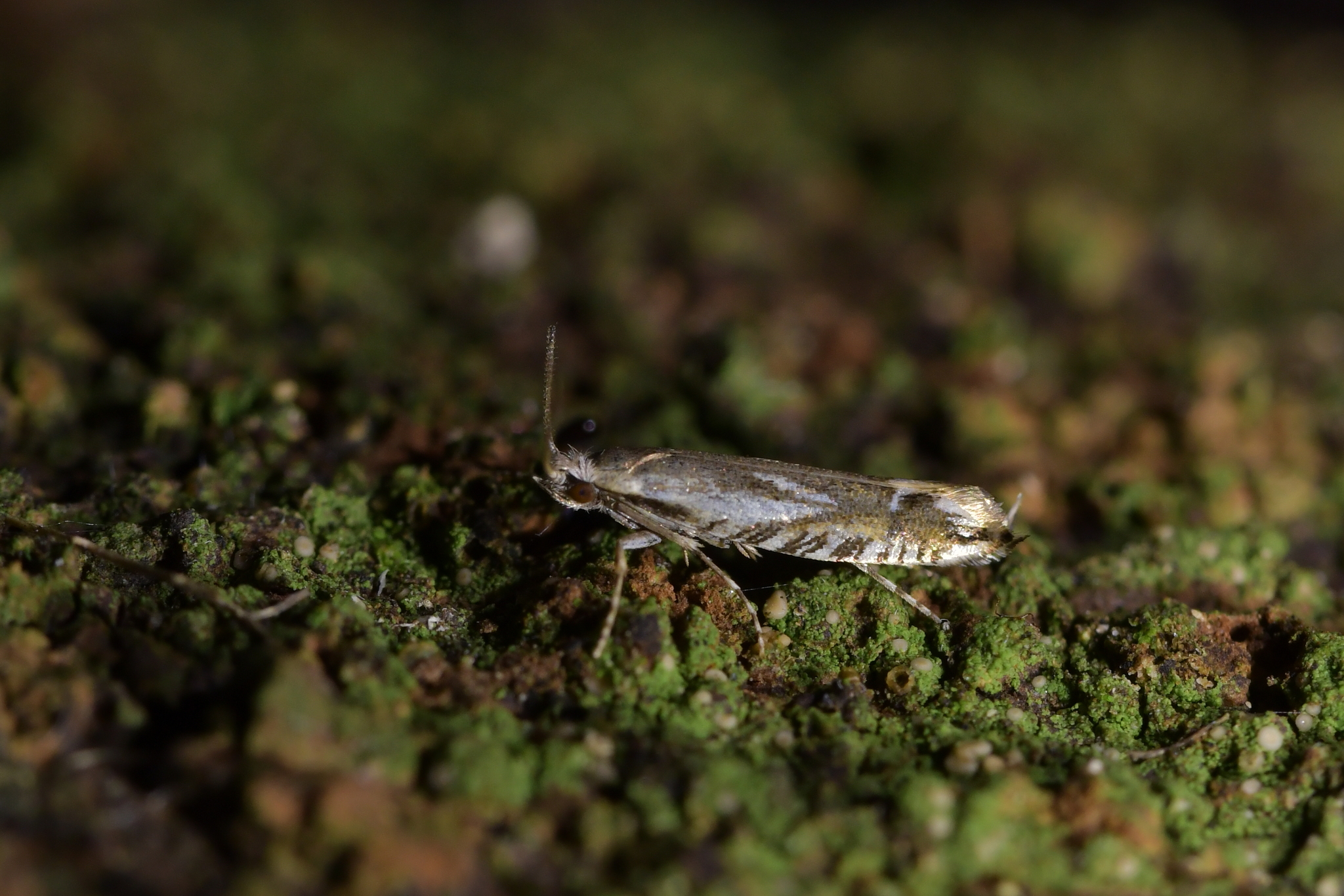
Living specimen of E. decoranda.

This species is endemic to New Zealand. It has been observed only in the Chatham Islands.

== Host species ==
Larvae of species in the genus Erechthias feed on dead plant debris or the tough leaves of plants such as palms.

== Behaviour ==
Adults are on the wing in October, December and March.
