= Erechthias kerri =

Scientific classification
- Kingdom: Animalia
- Phylum: Arthropoda
- Clade: Pancrustacea
- Class: Insecta
- Order: Lepidoptera
- Family: Tineidae
- Genus: Erechthias
- Species: E. kerri

Binomial name
- Erechthias kerri (Swezey, 1926)

Synonyms
- Ereunetis kerri Swezey, 1926; Decadarchis kerri; Ereunetis incerta Swezey, 1926

Species of moth

Erechthias kerri is a moth of the family Tineidae. It was first described by Otto Swezey in 1926. It is found in the Pacific region, including the French Frigate Shoals, Lisianski, Laysan, the Pearl and Hermes Reef, Johnston Island and Hawaii.
