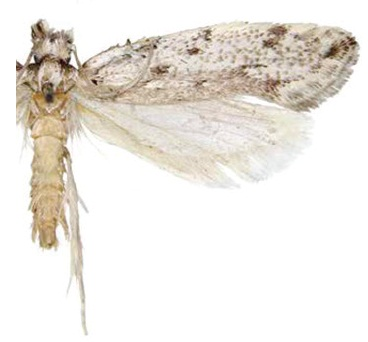

Scientific classification
- Kingdom: Animalia
- Phylum: Arthropoda
- Clade: Pancrustacea
- Class: Insecta
- Order: Lepidoptera
- Family: Tineidae
- Genus: Erechthias
- Species: E. dracaenura

Binomial name
- Erechthias dracaenura (Meyrick, 1934)

Synonyms
- Decadarchis dracaenura Meyrick, 1934

= Erechthias dracaenura =

Species of moth

Erechthias dracaenura is a moth of the family Tineidae. It is endemic to São Tomé Island, an island off the western equatorial coast of Central Africa. The species was described by Edward Meyrick in 1934.

The length of the forewings is about 8 mm. The forewings have a whitish background colour, irrorated (speckled) with isolated brown scales and marked with 6–8 scattered, moderately large, darker brown to black spots.
