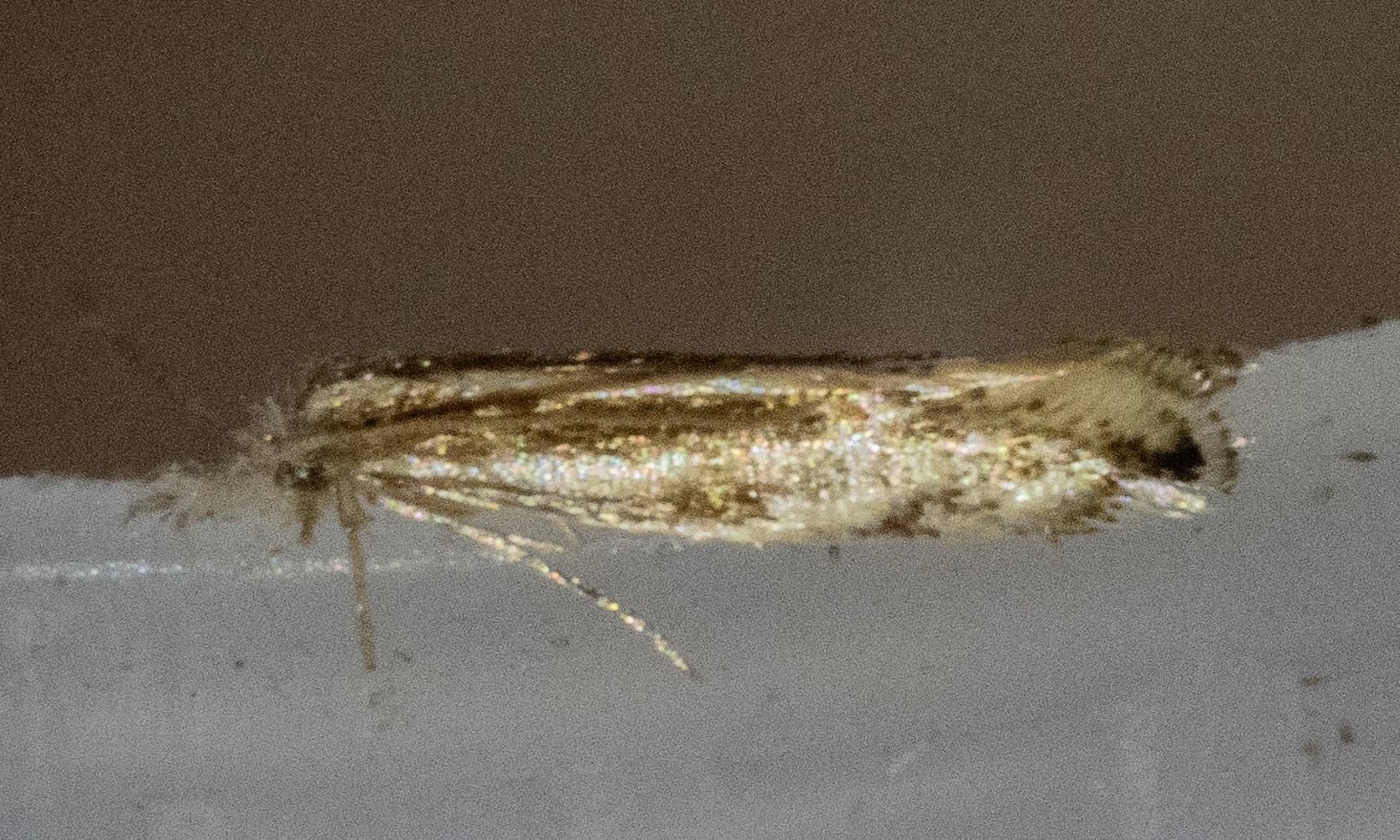

Scientific classification
- Kingdom: Animalia
- Phylum: Arthropoda
- Clade: Pancrustacea
- Class: Insecta
- Order: Lepidoptera
- Family: Tineidae
- Genus: Erechthias
- Species: E. indicans

Binomial name
- Erechthias indicans Meyrick, 1923

= Erechthias indicans =

Species of moth

Erechthias indicans is a species of moth in the family Tineidae. It was first described by Edward Meyrick in 1923. This species is endemic to New Zealand and has been observed in Wellington in January.

== Taxonomy ==
This species was first described by Edward Meyrick in 1923. The female holotype specimen of this species was collected by George Vernon Hudson in Karori, Wellington and is held at the Natural History Museum, London.

== Description ==
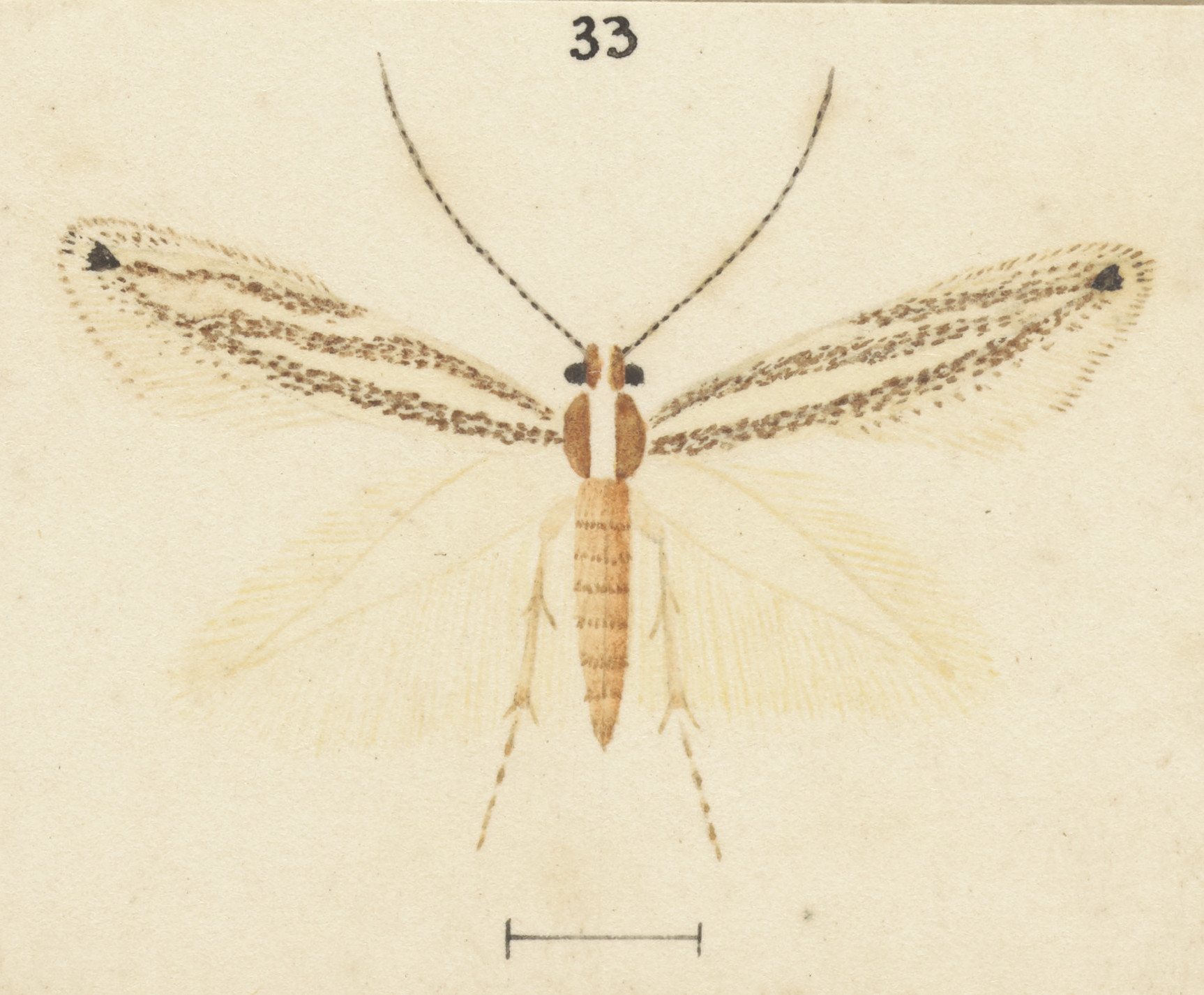
Illustration of female E. indicans

Meyrick described this species as follows:

♀ 9 mm. Head white, sides of crown brown. Palpi fuscous, tip white. Thorax brown, with white dorsal stripe. Abdomen whitish. Forewings elongate-lanceolate, apex produced; brown irrorated with dark fuscous; an irregular white median stripe from base to 3/5, broadest towards its middle, apex pointed; a narrow white dorsal stripe from base to tornus; rather thick irregular very oblique white streaks from costa at middle and 3/4 almost to termen; a small round black apical spot preceded by a triangular white spot on costa: cilia whitish, round apex a median line of dark-fuscous points, a short subbasal similar line beneath apex, and one at base along termen. Hindwings and cilia whitish.

== Distribution ==
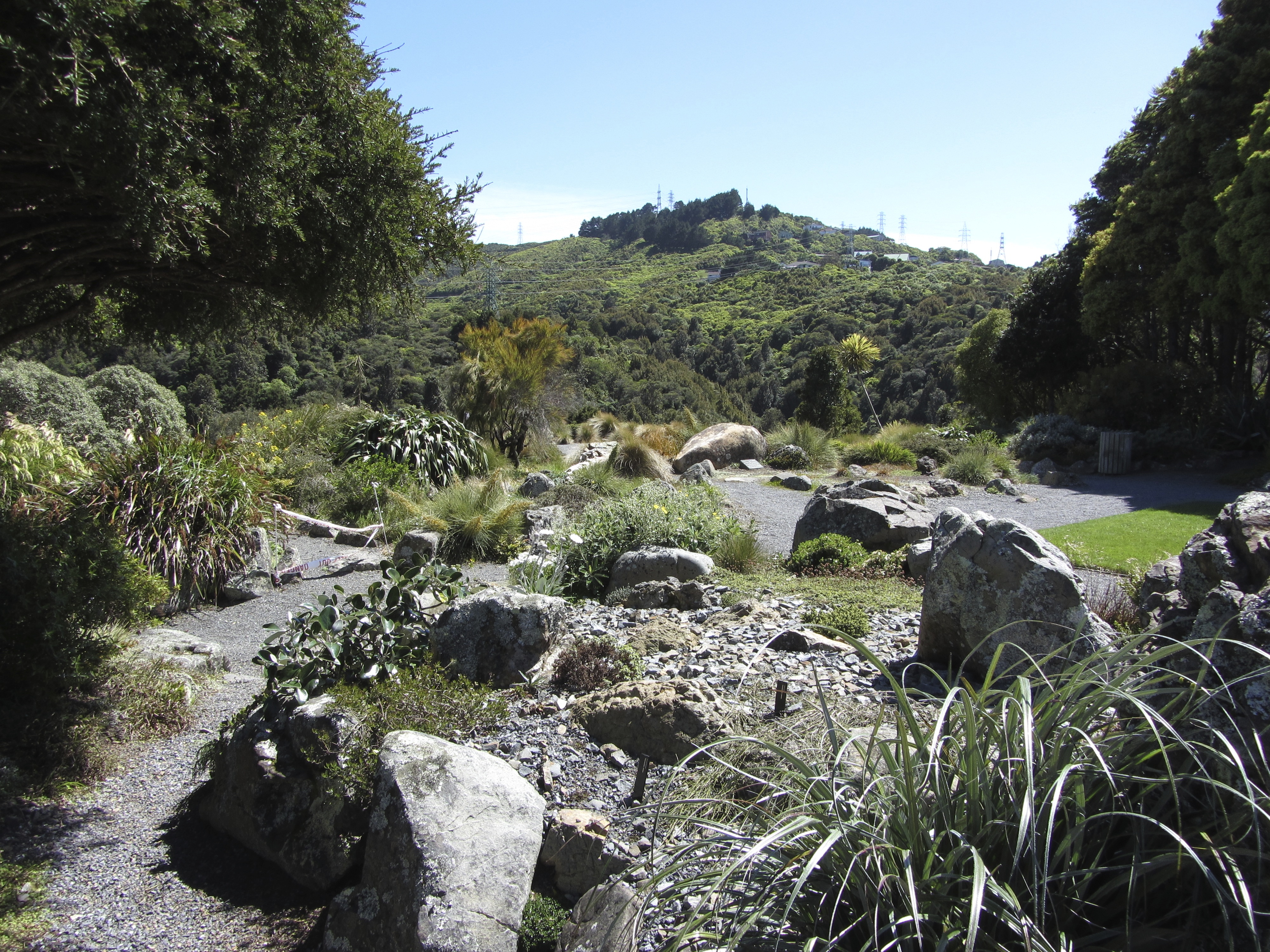
Ōtari-Wilton's Bush

This species is endemic to New Zealand. This species has been observed in Karori, Wellington and in Ōtari-Wilton's Bush.

== Behaviour ==
Adults are on the wing in January.
