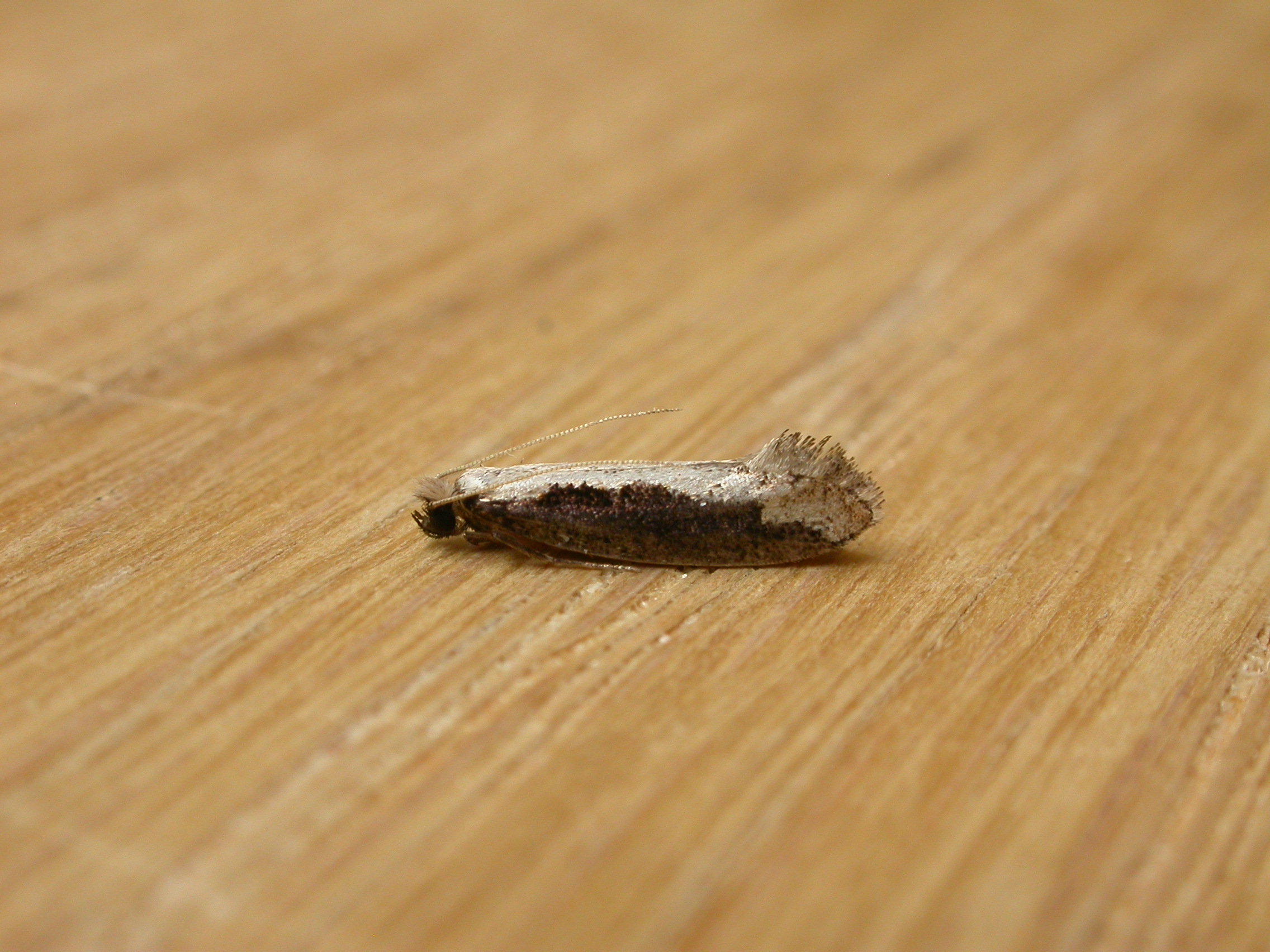

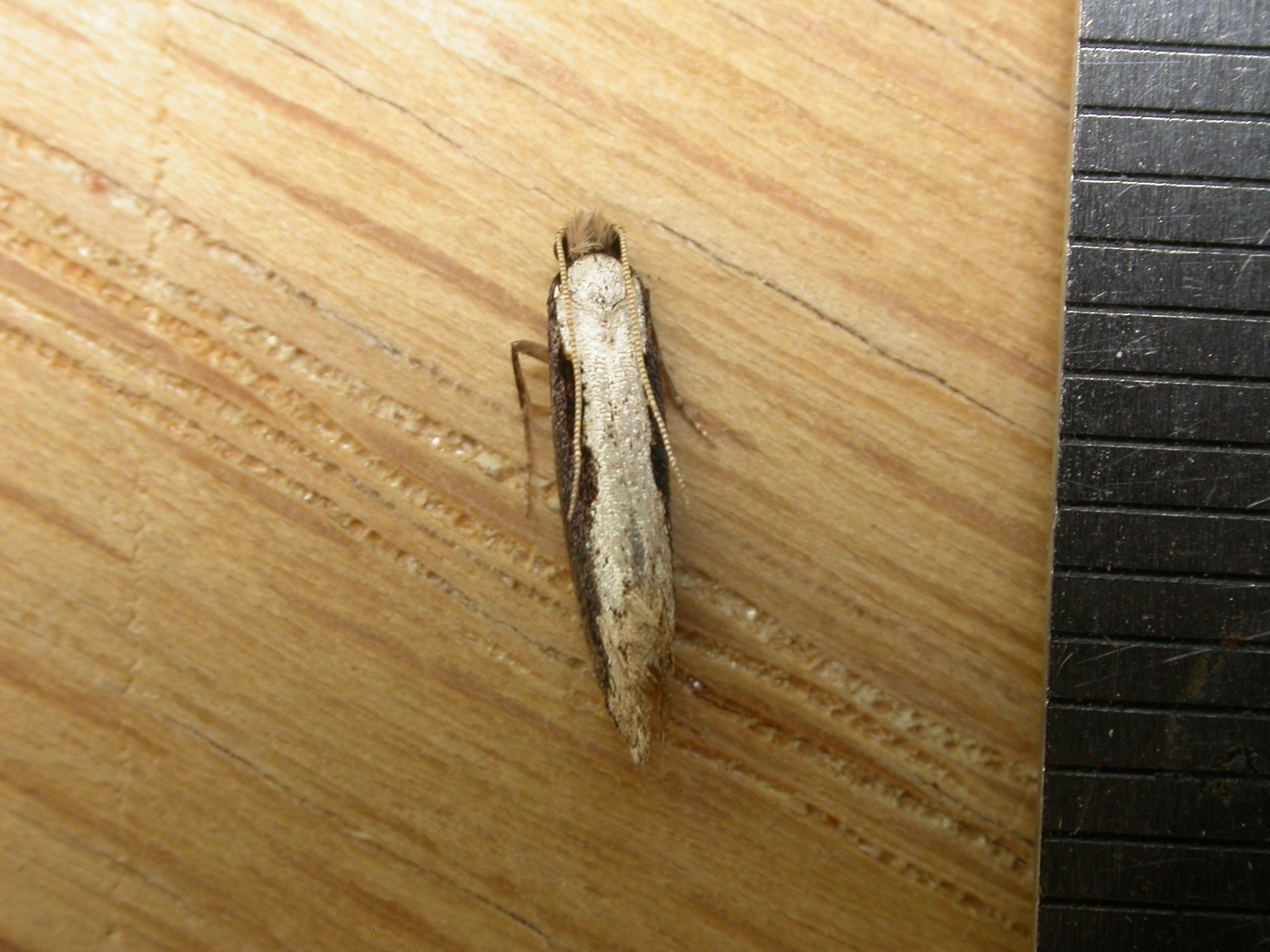

Scientific classification
- Kingdom: Animalia
- Phylum: Arthropoda
- Clade: Pancrustacea
- Class: Insecta
- Order: Lepidoptera
- Family: Tineidae
- Genus: Erechthias
- Species: E. diaphora

Binomial name
- Erechthias diaphora (Meyrick, 1893)

Synonyms
- Tinea diaphora Meyrick, 1893; Blabophanes heterogama Lower, 1894

= Erechthias diaphora =

Species of moth

Erechthias diaphora is a moth of the family Tineidae. It is known from Australia, including New South Wales, Queensland and Victoria.
