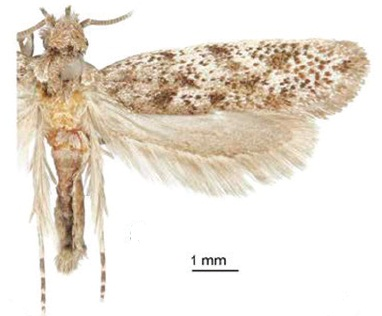

Scientific classification
- Kingdom: Animalia
- Phylum: Arthropoda
- Clade: Pancrustacea
- Class: Insecta
- Order: Lepidoptera
- Family: Tineidae
- Genus: Erechthias
- Species: E. ascensionae

Binomial name
- Erechthias ascensionae Davis & Mendel, 2013

= Erechthias ascensionae =

Species of moth

Erechthias ascensionae is a moth of the family Tineidae. It is endemic to Ascension Island.

The length of the forewings is 5–6 mm. The forewings are predominantly pale whitish cream, irrorated (speckled) with scattered dark brown scales. The hindwings are uniformly pale greyish brown.

The larvae are most likely plant detritivores or lichenivorous.

== Etymology ==
The species name is derived from the genitive case of the type locality.
