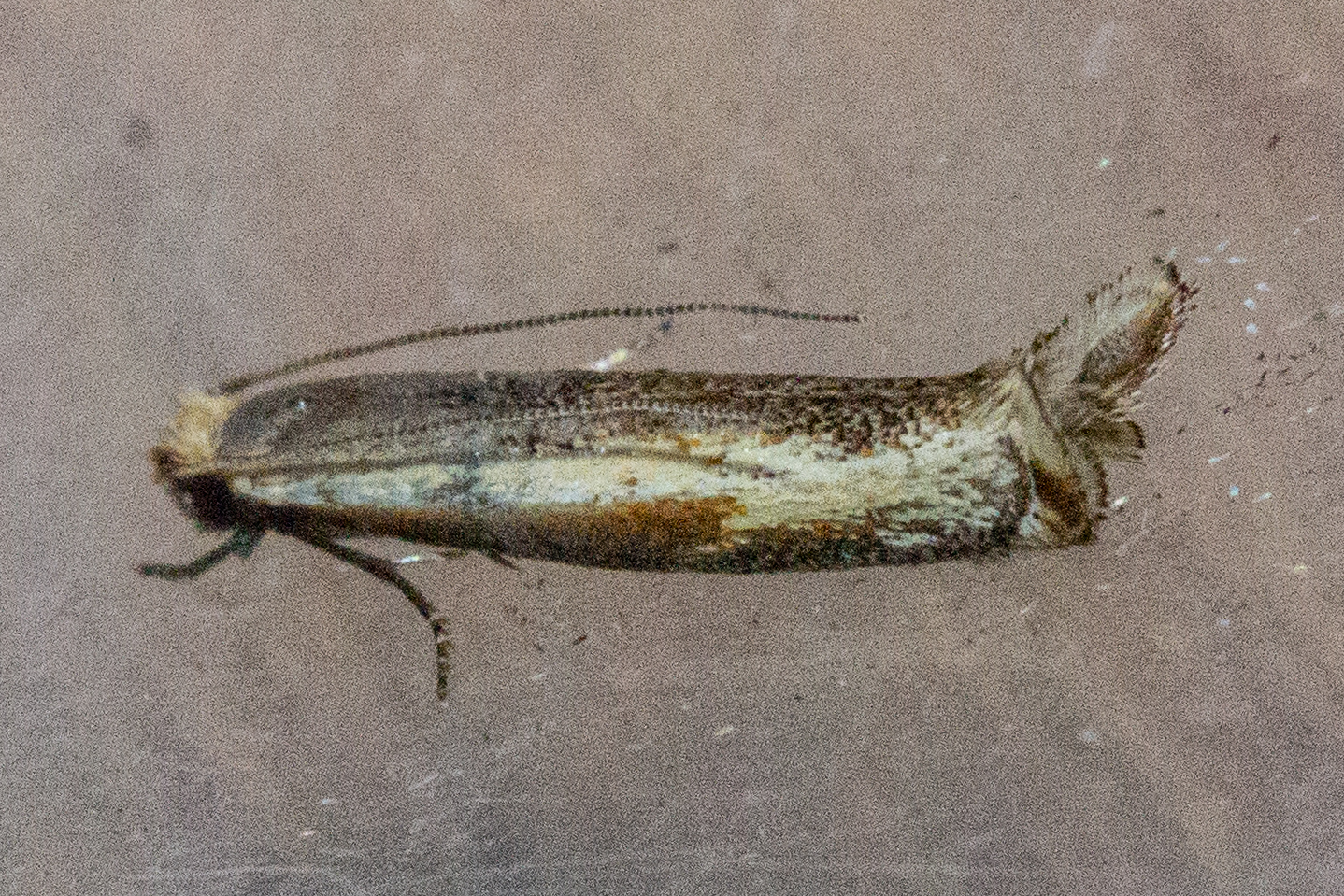

Scientific classification
- Kingdom: Animalia
- Phylum: Arthropoda
- Clade: Pancrustacea
- Class: Insecta
- Order: Lepidoptera
- Family: Tineidae
- Genus: Erechthias
- Species: E. charadrota

Binomial name
- Erechthias charadrota Meyrick, 1880

Synonyms
- Erechthias melanotricha Meyrick, 1888

= Erechthias charadrota =

Species of moth

Erechthias charadrota is a species of moth in the family Tineidae. It was first described by Edward Meyrick in 1880. This species is endemic to New Zealand and is found on both the North and South Islands. It inhabits native forest and the larvae likely feed on either deceased plant detritus or tough leaves of plants such as palms or flax. Adults are on the wing commonly from October to February and it is likely this species has two broods per year. Adults have been trapped via a blacklight.

== Taxonomy ==
This species was first described by Edward Meyrick in 1880 using three specimens caught in dry forest-scrub near Wellington and Port Lyttelton during the month of January. In 1888 Meyrick, thinking he was describing a new species, also named this moth Erechthias melanotricha. In 1927 Alfred Philpott studied and illustrated the male genitalia of this species. George Hudson, following Meyrick, discussed and illustrated E. charadrota and also discussed E. melantricha separately in his 1928 book The butterflies and moths of New Zealand. In 1988 John S. Dugdale synonymised E. melanotricha with E. charadrota. He pointed out that Meyrick was mistaken when he thought this species was not variable in depth of colour. The female lectotype specimen collected in Christchurch by Meyrick is held at the Natural History Museum, London.

== Description ==
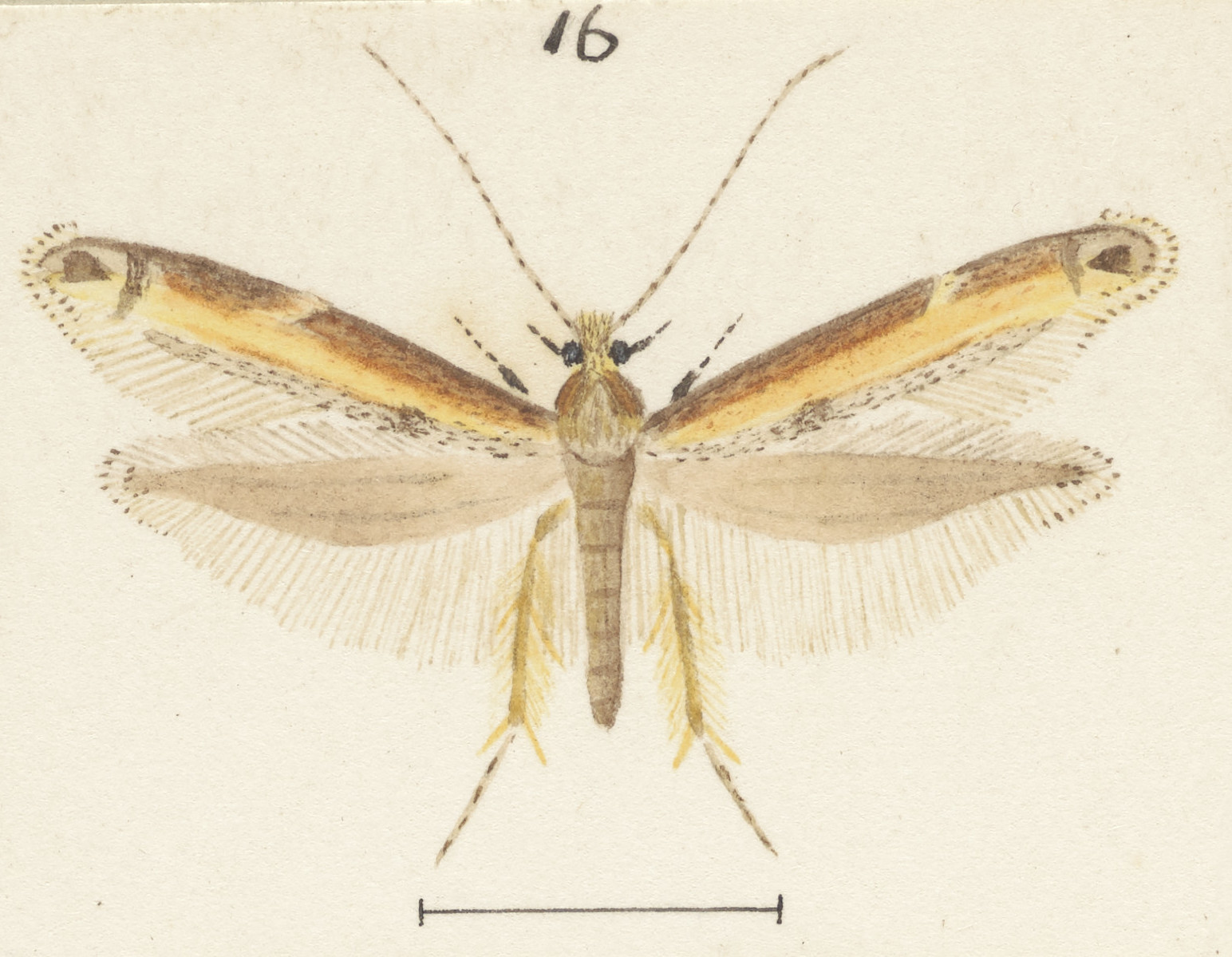
North Island specimen by Hudson.

Meyrick described this species as follows:

♂♀. 5"-6 1/2". Head and palpi pale ochreous, face darker ochreous; labial palpi externally dark fuscous, second joint roughly scaled beneath, with, two or three projecting bristles above at apex. Antennae pale ochreous, with obsolete darker fuscous annulations. Thorax pale ochreous. Abdomen greyish-ochreous. Anterior and middle legs blackish, tarsi with slender pale ochreous rings at apex of joints; posterior legs whitish-ochreous, tarsi suffused at base of joints with dark fuscous. Fore-wings narrow, pale ochreous; a broad sharply marked ochreous-fuscous streak, suffused with blackish, along costa from base toapex, narrowest at base and dilated beyond middle; a similar more evenly broad streak along inner-margin from base to anal angle; in the costal streak are a very slender pale ochreous oblique streak from middle of costa, and an irregular streak-like pale ochreous spot before apex; cilia whitish-ochreous, with two blackish dividing-lines, and a small apical hook-like spot beyond them. Hind-wings pale fuscous-grey, cilia whitish-grey, with two blackish lines round apex.

== Distribution ==
This species is endemic to New Zealand. It is found in both the North and South Islands.

== Habitat and hosts ==
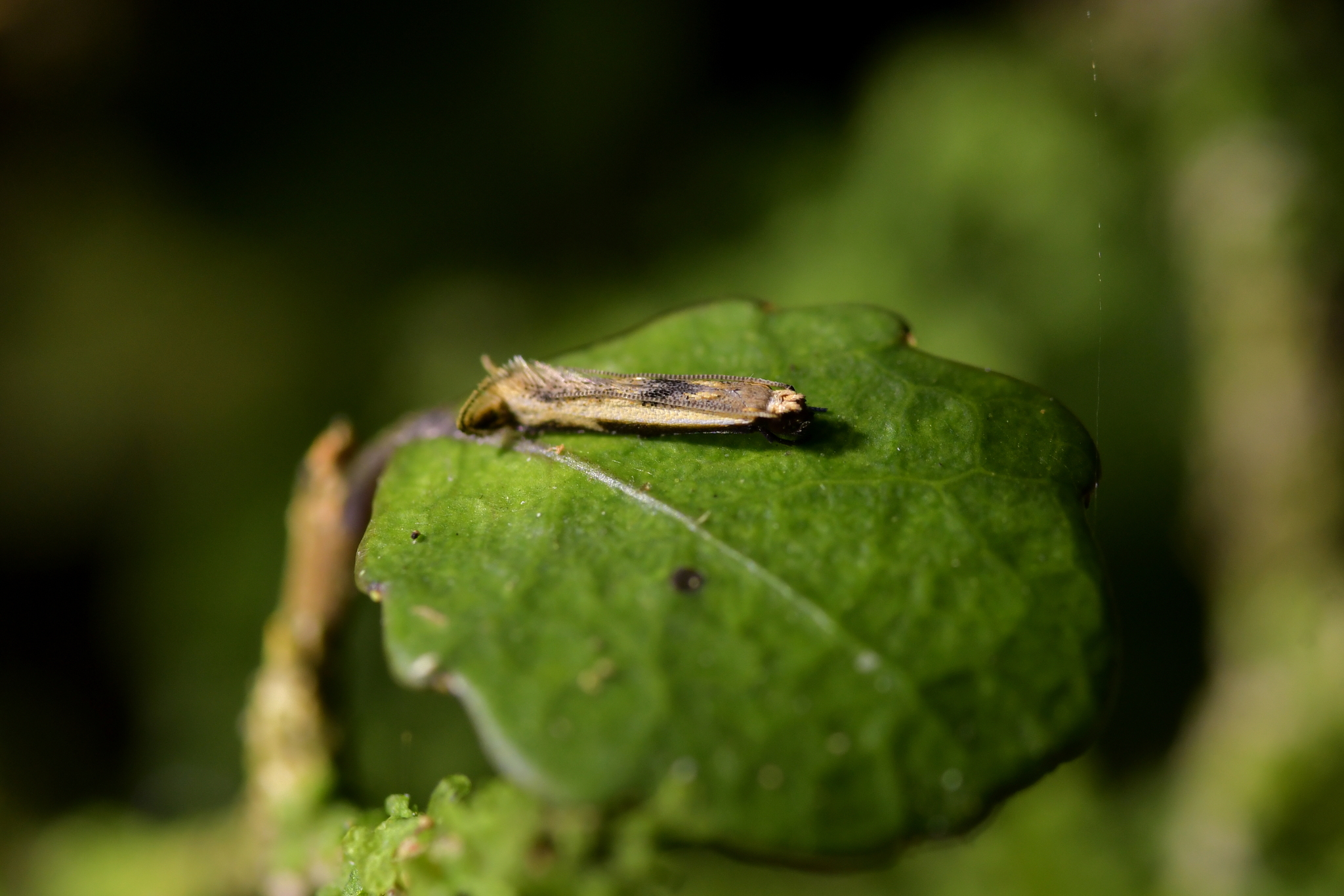
E. charadrota in native forest.

This species inhabits native forest. Larvae of species in the genus Erechthias feed on dead plant debris or the tough leaves of plants such as palms.

== Behaviour ==
Adults of this species are most commonly on the wing in October until February. Hudson was of the opinion that this species has two broods per year. Adults have been trapped at night using a 15 watt blacklight.
