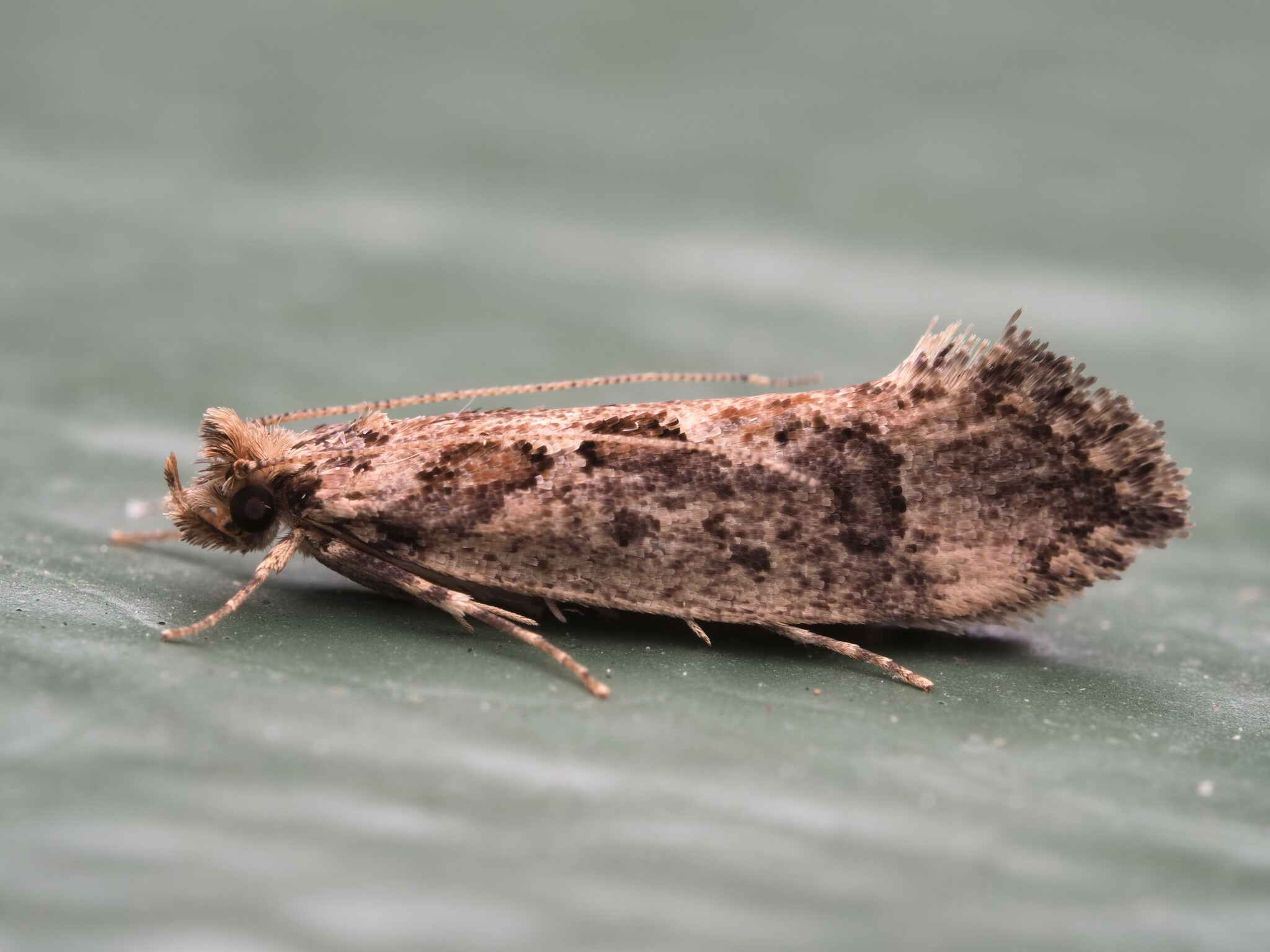

Scientific classification
- Kingdom: Animalia
- Phylum: Arthropoda
- Clade: Pancrustacea
- Class: Insecta
- Order: Lepidoptera
- Family: Tineidae
- Genus: Erechthias
- Species: E. capnitis

Binomial name
- Erechthias capnitis (Turner, 1918)

Synonyms
- Tinea capnitis Turner, 1918; Empaesta capnitis (Turner, 1918)

= Erechthias capnitis =

Species of moth found in Norfolk Island and New Zealand

Erechthias capnitis is a moth of the family Tineidae, first described by Alfred Jefferis Turner in 1918. It is originally endemic to Norfolk Island and is recorded as having arrived in New Zealand by 1977. This species can be found in the north half of the North Island of New Zealand as well as in New Plymouth and Wellington. Larvae feed on dry dead wood as well as on Cordyline australis. Adult moths are on the wing throughout the year and are attracted to light.

== Taxonomy ==
This species was first described by Alfred Jefferis Turner in 1918 and was originally named Tinea capnitis. In 1956 John David Bradley placed this species in the genus Empaesta.

== Distribution ==
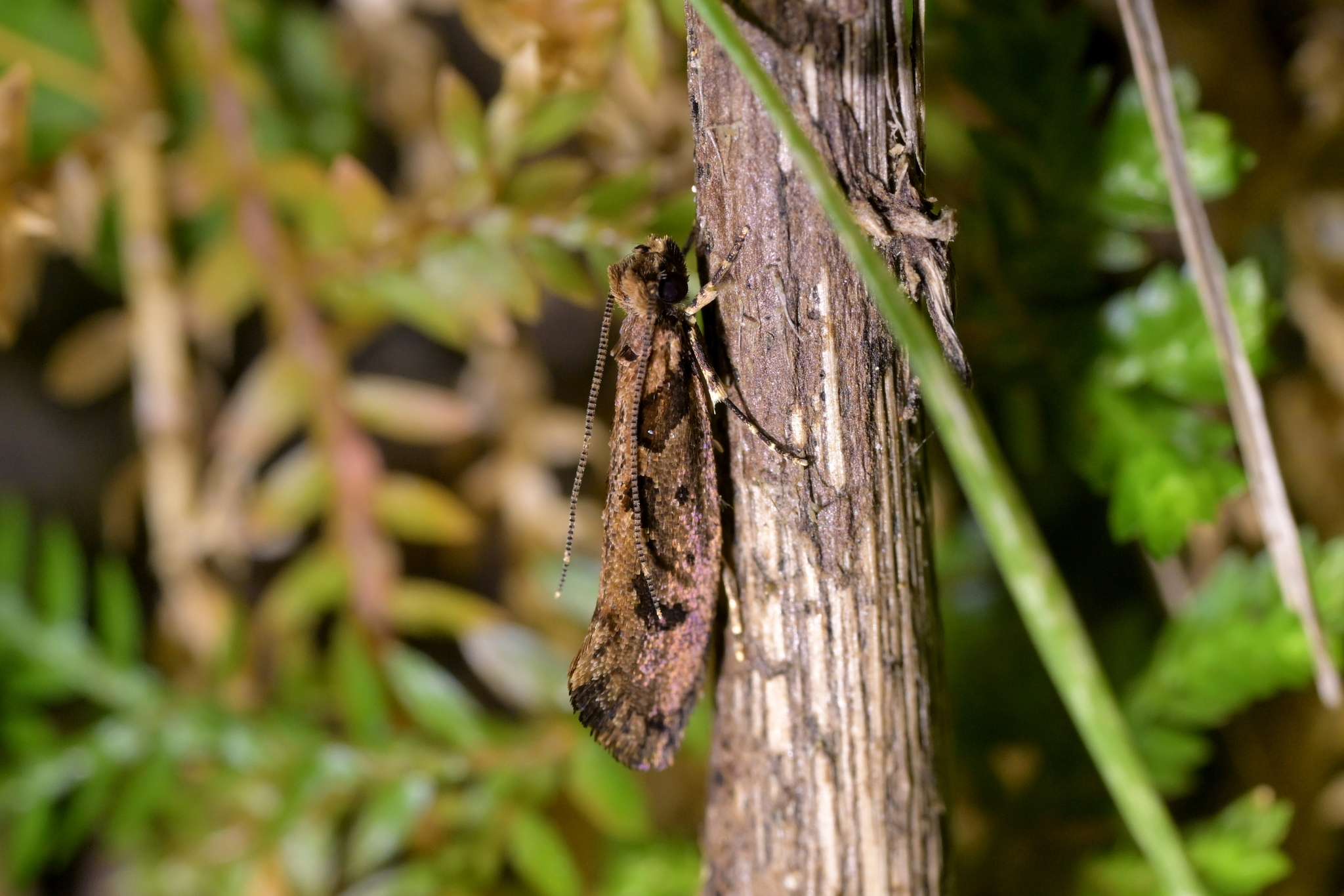
Erechthias capnitis in New Zealand.

This species is found in Norfolk Island and is widespread in the north half of the North Island. It was first recorded in New Zealand in 1977. As at 2024 it has also been recorded in New Plymouth and Wellington.

== Description ==
Turner described this species as follows:

♂, 17-18 mm. Head fuscous-whitish. Palpi 2 1/2; fuscous, inner surface whitish. Antennae pale fuscous; in male with joints enlarged at apices, minutely ciliated. Thorax fuscous. Abdomen ochreous-whitish, suffused with fuscous on dorsum. Legs fuscous; tibiae and tarsi annulated with ochreous-whitish; posterior pair almost wholly ochreous-whitish. Forewings moderate, not dilated, costa strongly arched, apex pointed, termen very obliquely rounded; ochreous-whitish rather densely irrorated with fuscous; absence of irroration leaves an obscure pale dorsal streak containing some fuscous scales near margin; very obscure fuscous discal dots at 1/3 and 2/3; cilia fuscous. Hindwings and cilia grey-whitish.

== Behaviour ==
The adults of this moth are on the wing throughout the year and are attracted to light.

== Host species ==
The larvae of E. capnitis feed on dry dead wood or stems as well as on Cordyline australis.
