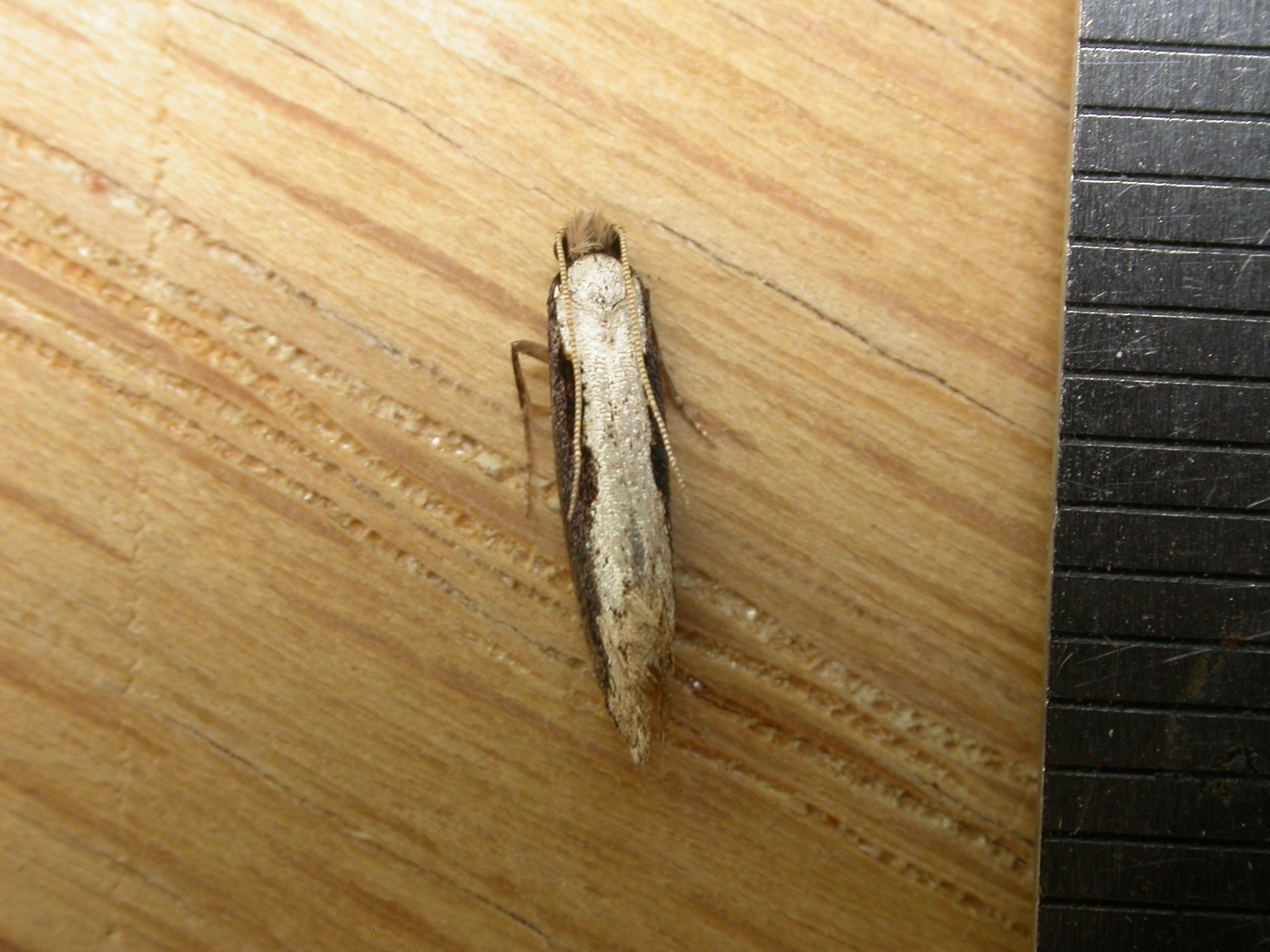
- Erechthias diaphora imago from Blackheath, New South Wales

Scientific classification
- Kingdom: Animalia
- Phylum: Arthropoda
- Clade: Pancrustacea
- Class: Insecta
- Order: Lepidoptera
- Family: Tineidae
- Subfamily: Erechthiinae
- Genus: Erechthias; Meyrick, 1880

Type species
- Erechthias charadrota Meyrick, 1880

Diversity
- Over 150 species [?] (see text)

Synonyms
- Numerous, see text

= Erechthias =

Genus of moths

Erechthias is a genus of the fungus moth family, Tineidae. Therein, it belongs to the subfamily Erechthiinae, of which it is the type genus. The exact circumscription of this genus is still disputed, but it may encompass more than 150 species.

== Systematics and taxonomy ==
Here, the genus is treated in the wide circumscription (sensu lato) adopted by many authors today, and represents the presumed core group of the Erechthiinae. Delimited thus, Erechthias includes several other genera, some of which have occasionally been treated as independent even by fairly recent authors. They are still rather similar and contain moths that are (at least overwhelmingly) very closely related. Still, they differ in details such as the wing venation – with Erechthias sensu stricto having all veins separate (as opposed to e.g. the Decadarchis group, which has hindwing veins 5 and 6 stalked) – or the clasper's harpe being nude in Erechthias s.str. but bearing a cluster of setae on the costa. However, the female genitals look almost alike in all of them.

Many of these supposedly distinct genera were always considered monotypic and are unlikely to be valid. More notable are Decadarchis (including Caryolestis, Nesoxena, Pantheus, and perhaps others) and Ereunetis (including Lepidobregma and Neodecadarchis); these two are more frequently considered separate genera than other subgroups of Erechthias. The members of the former (sub)genus were in fact at first often placed in Tinea of subfamily Tineinae. Other species of Erechthias were historically assigned to Acridotarsa – also of the Tineinae (E. deloneura) – or to Mesopherna of the Myrmecozelinae (E. epomadia). E. glyphidaula has been a particular source of confusion; even veteran researcher Edward Meyrick, in some of his last works, no less than three times established a new monotypic genus for this species.

More unusually, some species of Erechthias were initially mistaken as members of the cosmet moth genus Cosmopteryx (E. cyanosticta) and the ermine moth genus Argyresthia (E. zebrina); these genera are basal Ditrysia not particularly closely related to Erechthias. The enigmatic "genus" Acrocenotes – a single species initially held to belong to the Plutellidae, which are also not close relatives of Erechthias – is also included here in the present treatment.

As another taxonomic curiosity of this genus, E. beeblebroxi is named after Douglas Adams's famous two-headed science fiction character Zaphod Beeblebrox; the moth has a "false head" pattern that presumably helps to confuse would-be predators.

Finally, the actual delimitation of Erechthias against related genera such as Comodica still needs to be determined. For example, whether the Erechthiinae Callicerastis stagmatias and Mecomodica fullawayi are justifiably separated in their monotypic genera or better included in Erechthias (as are all the other species once placed in Callicerastis) is disputed; the latter in particular seems to be somewhat intermediate between Comodica and Erechthias.

== Selected species ==
The numerous species of Erechthias include:

- Erechthias acontistes Meyrick, 1880
- Erechthias acontotypa Turner, 1926
- Erechthias acrodina (Meyrick, 1912)
- Erechthias acroleuca Turner, 1923
- Erechthias aellophora Meyrick, 1880
- Erechthias ancistrosema Turner, 1939
- Erechthias ascensionae
- Erechthias articulosa Meyrick, 1921
- Erechthias aspera (J.F.G.Clarke, 1986)
- Erechthias beeblebroxi Robinson & Nielsen, 1993
- Erechthias capnitis (Turner, 1918) (type of Empaesta)
- Erechthias celestra (J.F.G.Clarke, 1986)
- Erechthias celetica Turner, 1923
- Erechthias centroscia (Turner, 1933) (type of Gongylodes)
- Erechthias charadrota Meyrick, 1880
- Erechthias chasmatias (Meyrick, 1880) (type of Hectacma)
- Erechthias chionodira Meyrick, 1880
- Erechthias cirrhogramma (J.F.G.Clarke, 1971)
- Erechthias citrinopa (Lower, 1905) (sometimes in Comodica)
- Erechthias clistopa (Meyrick, 1929)
- Erechthias contributa (Meyrick, 1932) (sometimes in Comodica)
- Erechthias coleosema (Meyrick, 1934)
- Erechthias crypsimima (Meyrick, 1920)
- Erechthias cyanosticta (Lower, 1916)
- Erechthias darwini
- Erechthias decaspila (Lower, 1905) (sometimes in Comodica)
- Erechthias decoranda (Meyrick, 1925)
- Erechthias deloneura (Turner, 1923)
- Erechthias diacrita (Turner, 1923)
- Erechthias diaphora
- Erechthias dochmogramma (Lower, 1916) (sometimes in Comodica)
- Erechthias dracaenura
- Erechthias elaeorrhoa Meyrick, 1880
- Erechthias epispora (Lower, 1905) (sometimes in Comodica)
- Erechthias epomadia (Turner, 1923)
- Erechthias erebocosma (Meyrick, 1893)
- Erechthias eurynipha (Turner, 1923) (sometimes in Comodica)
- Erechthias exospila (Meyrick, 1901)
- Erechthias externella (Walker, 1864)
- Erechthias flavistriata (Walsingham, 1907) – sugarcane bud moth (type of Neodecadarchis)
- Erechthias fulguritella (Walker, 1863)
- Erechthias glyphidaula (Meyrick, 1933) (type of Amphisyncentris)
- Erechthias grayi
- Erechthias hemiclistra (Meyrick, 1911)
- Erechthias incongrua (J.F.G.Clarke, 1986)
- Erechthias indicans Meyrick, 1923
- Erechthias iseres (Turner, 1917)
- Erechthias iuloptera (Meyrick, 1880) (type of Ereunetis)
- Erechthias kerri
- Erechthias lychnopa Meyrick, 1927
- Erechthias macrozyga Meyrick, 1916
- Erechthias minuscula – erechthias clothes moth (type of Lepidobregma)
- Erechthias molynta
- Erechthias mucronata (Meyrick, 1921) (type of Zanclopseustis)
- Erechthias mystacinella – curve-winged apple moth
- Erechthias niphadopla Meyrick, 1880
- Erechthias niphoplaca (Turner, 1923)
- Erechthias orchestris (Turner, 1932)
- Erechthias oxymacha (Meyrick, 1893)
- Erechthias oxytona (Meyrick, 1893)
- Erechthias penicillata (type of Pantheus)
- Erechthias percnomicta (Meyrick, 1934)
- Erechthias phileris (Meyrick, 1893)
- Erechthias photophanes (Meyrick, 1917)
- Erechthias physocapna (Meyrick, 1929)
- Erechthias polionota Turner, 1923
- Erechthias polyplecta Turner, 1923
- Erechthias praedatrix (Meyrick, 1934) (type of Caryolestis)
- Erechthias psammaula (Meyrick, 1921)
- Erechthias rufimacula (Meyrick, 1934)
- Erechthias saitoi (Moriuti & Kadohara, 1994) (sometimes in Comodica)
- Erechthias scythromorpha (Turner, 1926)
- Erechthias sphenotoma (Meyrick, 1935) (type of Aeolarchis)
- Erechthias simulans (type of Decadarchis)
- Erechthias sinapifera (Turner, 1926)
- Erechthias stilbella (Doubleday, 1843)
- Erechthias strangulata (Meyrick, 1929) (type of Nesoxena)
- Erechthias symmacha (Meyrick, 1893)
- Erechthias terminella (Walker, 1863)
- Erechthias trigonosema (Turner, 1923)
- Erechthias tritogramma (J.F.G.Clarke, 1986)
- Erechthias zebrina (type of Tinexotaxa)

== Synonyms ==
Numerous genera have become junior synonyms of Erechthias. These include:

- Acrocenotes A.N.Diakonoff, 1968
- Aeolarchis Meyrick, 1935
- Amphisyncentris Meyrick, 1933
- Anemerarcha Meyrick, 1937
- Caryolestis Meyrick, 1934
- Decadarchis Meyrick, 1886
- Empaesta Bradley, 1956
- Ereunetis Meyrick, 1880
- Gongylodes A.J.Turner, 1933
- Hectacma Meyrick, 1915
- Lepidobregma Zimmerman, 1978
- Neodecadarchis Zimmerman, 1978
- Nesoxena Meyrick, 1929
- Pantheus Zimmerman, 1978
- Tinexotaxa Gozmany, 1968
- Triadogona Meyrick, 1937
- Zanclopseustis Meyrick, 1921
