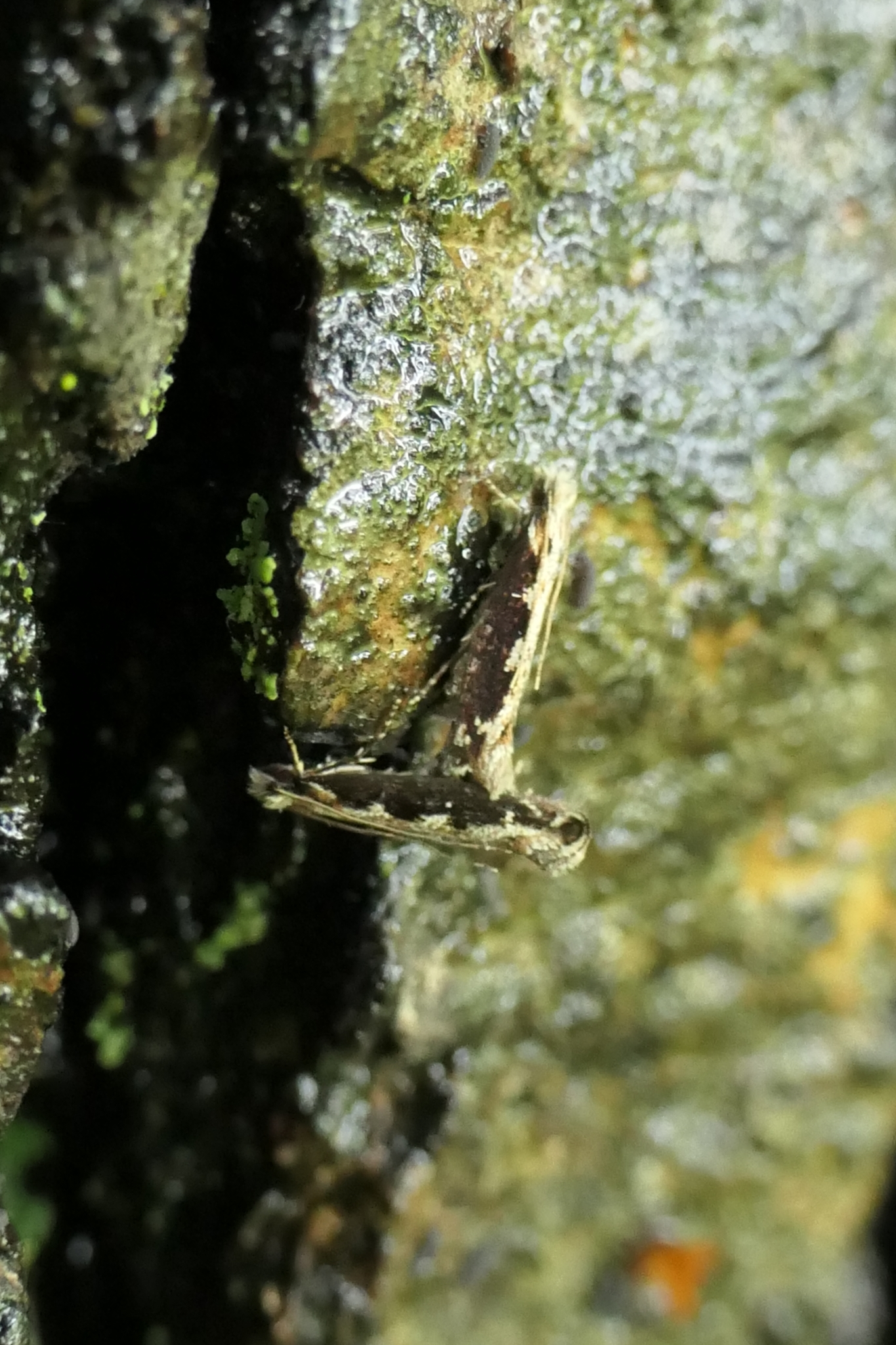

Scientific classification
- Kingdom: Animalia
- Phylum: Arthropoda
- Clade: Pancrustacea
- Class: Insecta
- Order: Lepidoptera
- Family: Tineidae
- Genus: Erechthias
- Species: E. macrozyga

Binomial name
- Erechthias macrozyga Meyrick, 1916

= Erechthias macrozyga =

Species of moth

Erechthias macrozyga is a species of moth of the family Tineidae. It was described by Edward Meyrick in 1916. This species is endemic to New Zealand and has been observed in the North and South Islands. This species inhabits lowland native forest. Adult moths are on the wing from October to February.

== Taxonomy ==
This species was first described by Edward Meyrick in 1916 using a male specimen collected at Tisbury, Invercargill by Alfred Philpott. In 1927 Alfred Philpott studied and illustrated the male genitalia of this species. George Hudson discussed and illustrated this species under this name in his book The butterflies and moths of New Zealand. John S. Dugdale discussed this species in his 1988 catalogue. The holotype specimen is held at the Natural History Museum, London.

== Description ==
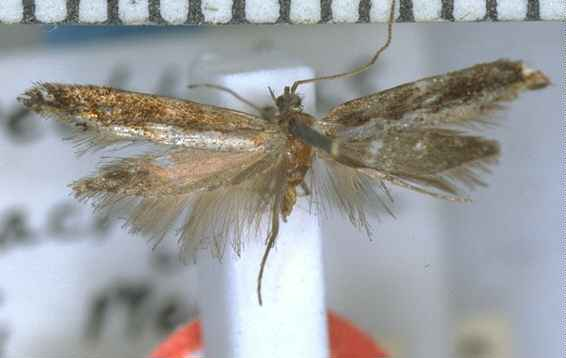
Male holotype

Meyrick described the male adult of this species as follows:

♂. 14 mm. Head white, crown mixed with dark fuscous. Thorax white marked with dark fuscous (injured). Abdomen grey. Forewings narrow - lanceolate; dark bronzy - fuscous sprinkled with blackish; an irregular-edged white streak along dorsum and termen from base nearly to apex; a white mark from costa just before apex : cilia fuscous mixed with white, with a dark-fuscous median line round apex. Hindwings purple-fuscous, darker towards apex : cilia fuscous.

== Distribution ==
This species is endemic to New Zealand. Other than the type locality, this species has also been observed in the Wellington, Hawke's Bay, Canterbury and Otago regions.

== Habitat ==
This species inhabits lowland native forest.

== Behaviour ==
Adult moths are on the wing from October to February.
