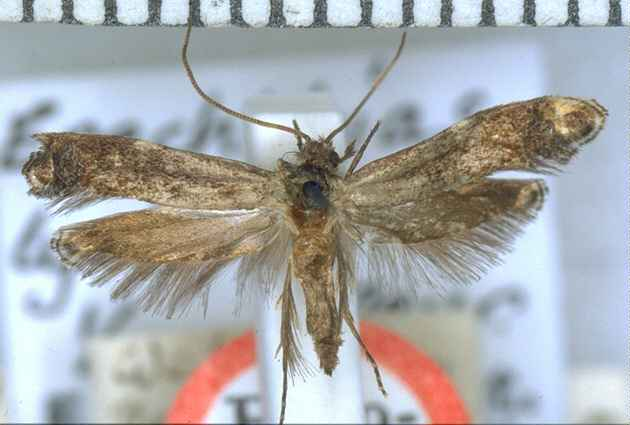
- Holotype

Conservation status
- Data Deficit (NZ TCS)

Scientific classification
- Kingdom: Animalia
- Phylum: Arthropoda
- Clade: Pancrustacea
- Class: Insecta
- Order: Lepidoptera
- Family: Tineidae
- Genus: Erechthias
- Species: E. lychnopa

Binomial name
- Erechthias lychnopa Meyrick, 1927

= Erechthias lychnopa =

Species of moth, endemic to New Zealand

Erechthias lychnopa is a species of moth in the family Tineidae. It was first described by Edward Meyrick in 1927. This species is endemic to New Zealand and has been observed in the North Island. The species inhabits scrub forest. It has been hypothesised that the larvae inhabit dead wood. In 2025 this species was classified as "data deficient" under the New Zealand Threat Classification System.

== Taxonomy ==
It was described by Edward Meyrick in 1927 from a specimen collected by George Hudson in November, in a karaka grove, near Sinclair Head, Wellington. Hudson discussed and illustrated this species in his 1928 publication The Butterflies and Moths of New Zealand. The holotype specimen is held at the Natural History Museum, London.

== Description ==
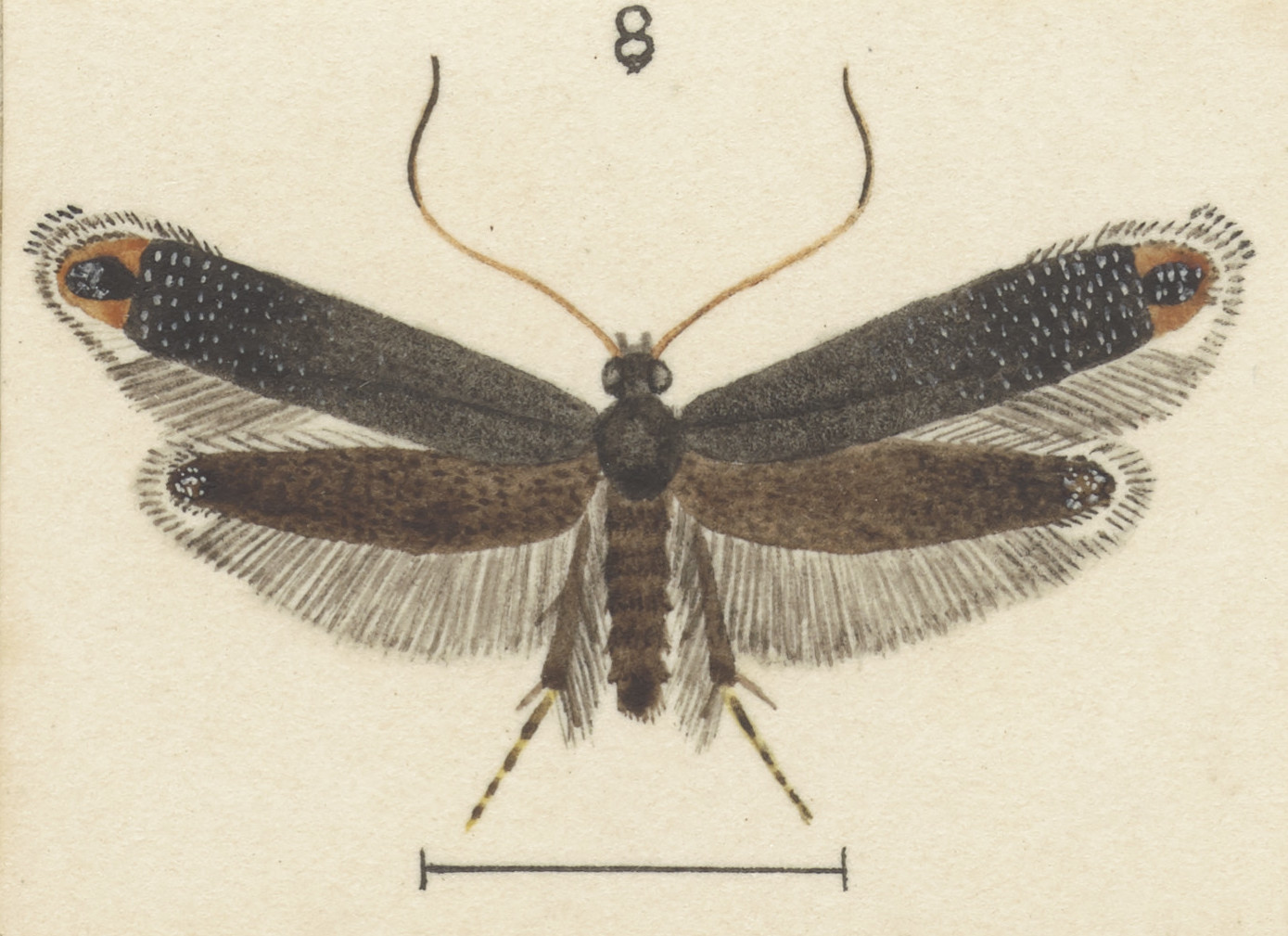
Illustration of E. lychnopa.

Live specimen.

Meyrick described the species as follows:

♂ 15 mm. Head, thorax greyish mixed darker. Palpi grey mixed blackish, beneath whitish. Antennae grey tinged fulvous on basal half. Forewings grey irregularly irrorated blackish scales finely edged whitish; a white mark on middle of costal edge; upturned apical area with median portion dark grey mixed blackish and speckled white, above and below this triangular light orange-ochreous spots, line of flexure with whitish reflections: cilia grey-whitish with blackish subbasal and postmedian shades, above apex a blackish external hook. Hindwings dark grey, an apical spot of whitish speckling; cilia grey, round apex whitish-tinged with three dark grey lines.

In appearance this species is very similar to Erechthias externalla however it can be distinguished from that species as E. lychnopa is much larger, as well as having an orange subapical spot on its forewings and orange-tinged antennae.

== Distribution ==
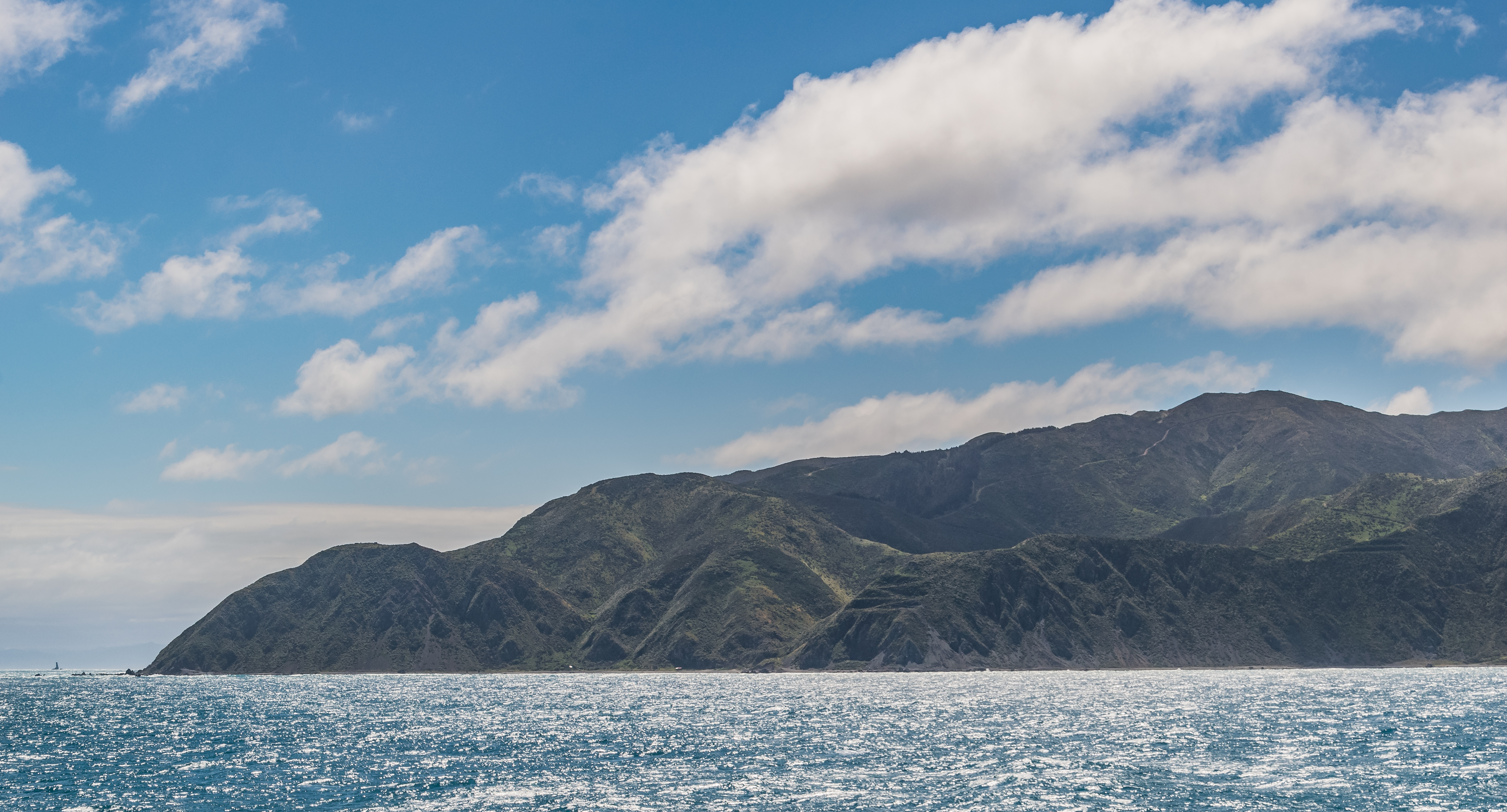
Sinclair Head, type locality of E. lychnopa.

This species is endemic to New Zealand. It has been observed in the North Island.

== Habitat and behaviour ==
This species inhabits scrub forest. The larvae of this species are likely to inhabit dead wood. The adult moths are on the wing in November.

== Conservation status ==
In 2025 this species was classified by the New Zealand Department of Conservation as "data deficient" under the New Zealand Threat Classification System.
