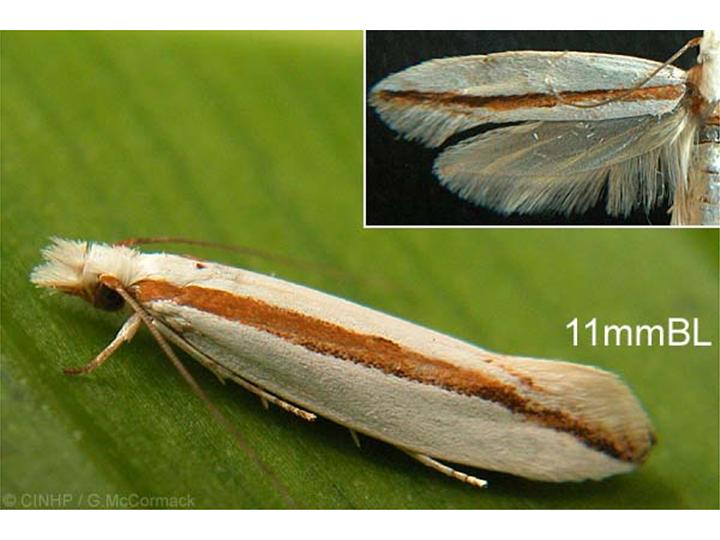

Scientific classification
- Kingdom: Animalia
- Phylum: Arthropoda
- Clade: Pancrustacea
- Class: Insecta
- Order: Lepidoptera
- Family: Tineidae
- Genus: Erechthias
- Species: E. psammaula

Binomial name
- Erechthias psammaula (Meyrick, 1921)

Synonyms
- Decadarchis psammaula Meyrick, 1921

= Erechthias psammaula =

Brown-stripe moth

Species of moth

Erechthias psammaula, the brown-stripe moth, is a moth of the family Tineidae. It is found on Fiji, French Polynesia, Tonga and the Cook Islands.

The larvae feed on the leaves of Cocos nucifera.
