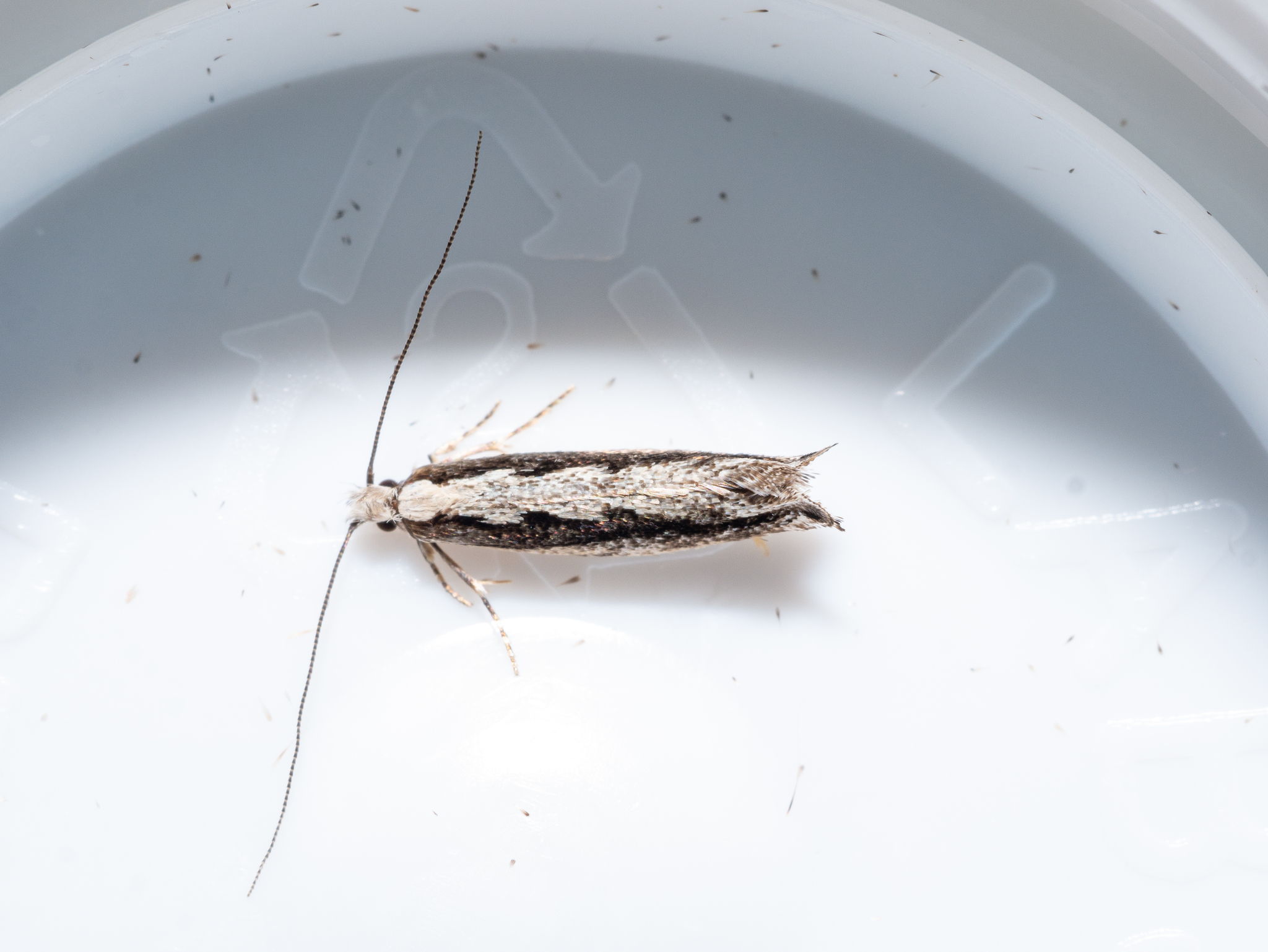

Scientific classification
- Kingdom: Animalia
- Phylum: Arthropoda
- Clade: Pancrustacea
- Class: Insecta
- Order: Lepidoptera
- Family: Tineidae
- Genus: Erechthias
- Species: E. fulguritella

Binomial name
- Erechthias fulguritella (Walker, 1863)

Synonyms
- Cerostoma fulguritella Walker, 1863

= Erechthias fulguritella =

Species of moth

Erechthias fulguritella is a species of moth in the family Tineidae. It was first described by Francis Walker in 1863. This species is endemic to New Zealand and can be found in both the North and South Islands. It inhabits native forest and scrub. Larvae of this species likely feed on dead plant debris and they have been observed feeding amongst the dead cones of Pinus radiata. Adults are on the wing from October to February and are variable in appearance both in colour and in wing markings.

== Taxonomy ==
This species was first described by Francis Walker in 1863 using specimens collected in Nelson by Thomas R. Oxley and originally named Cerostoma fulguritella. In 1915 Meyrick placed this species in the genus Erechthias. George Hudson discussed and illustrated this species in his 1928 book The butterflies and moths of New Zealand under that name. Hudson also discussed this species in his 1950 book Fragments of New Zealand entomology. The female holotype is held at the Natural History Museum, London.

== Description ==
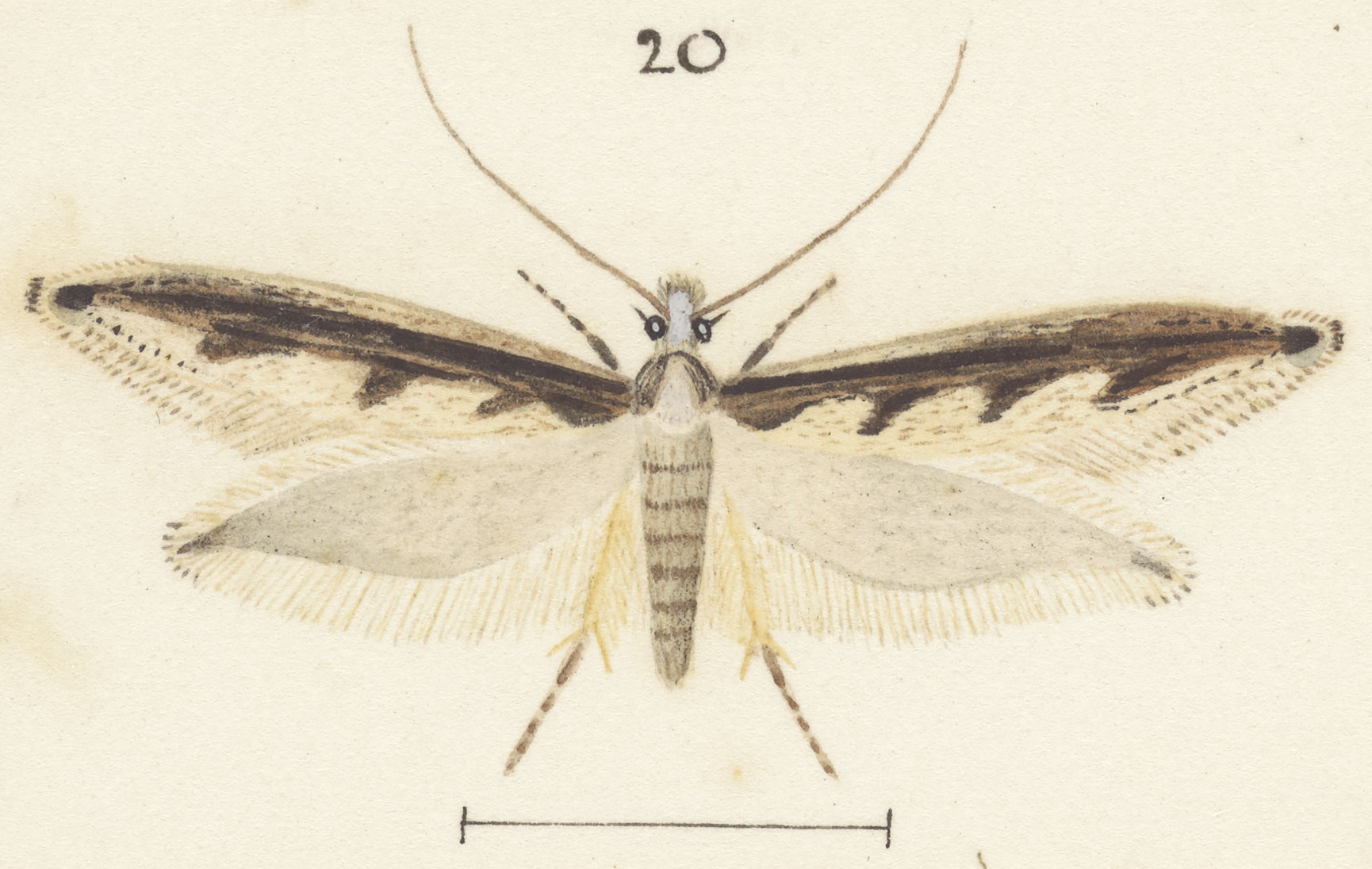
Illustration by Hudson.

Hudson described this species as follows:

The expansion of the wings varies from about 1/2 to 5/8 inch. The fore-wings are pale brownish-ochreous with the costal area more or less clouded with darker brown; there are several cloudy blackish streaks in the disc, extending from the base to the apex, the lowest of these emitting three blunt projections towards the dorsum; the dorsal area is very pale brownish-ochreous, often almost white; there is a black spot at the apex.The hind-wings are very pale greyish-brown, darker towards the apex.

This species can be variable in appearance both in colour and in wing markings.

== Distribution ==
This species is endemic to New Zealand. It can be found in both the North and South Islands.

== Habitat and host species ==
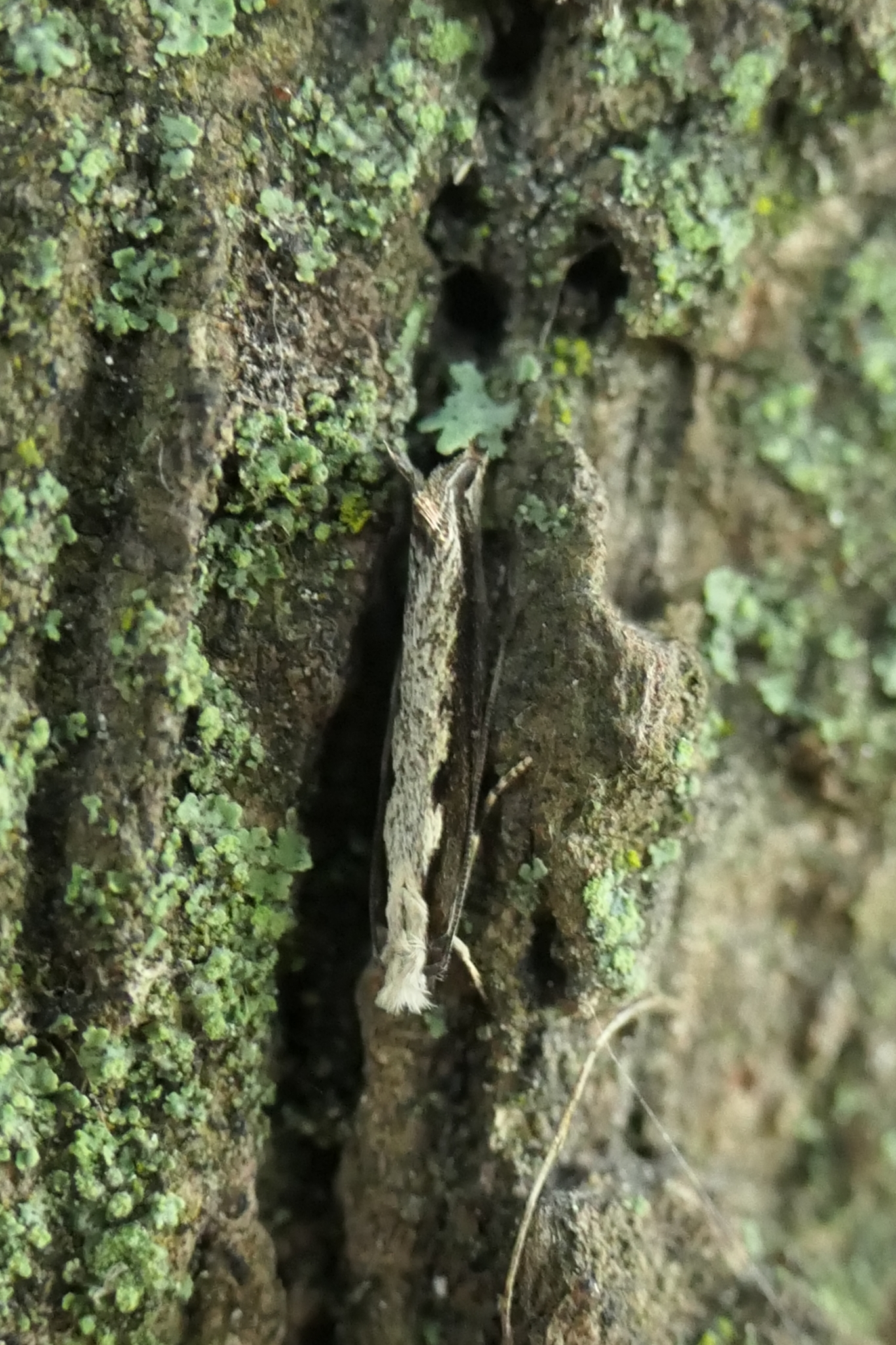
Living specimen of E. fulguritella.

This species inhabits native forest and scrub. Larvae of species in the genus Erechthias feed on dead plant debris or the tough leaves of plants such as palms. The larvae of this species have been observed feeding amongst the dead cones of Pinus radiata. Larvae have also been reared from the gall of lacebark.

== Behaviour ==
Adults are on the wing from October to February. They are attracted to light.
