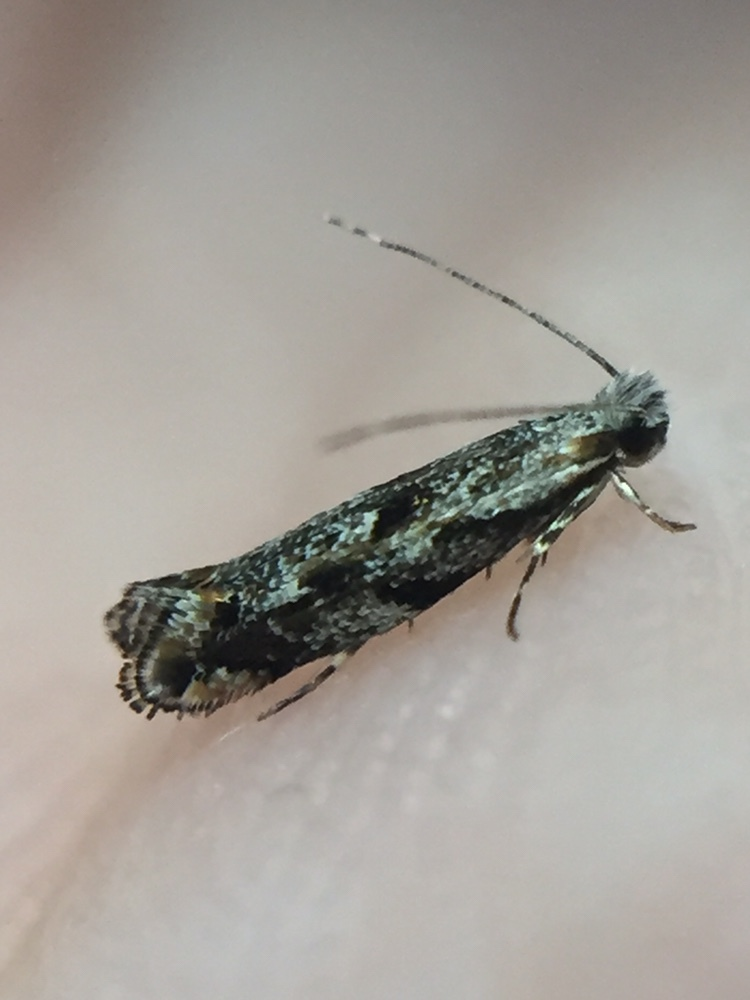

Scientific classification
- Kingdom: Animalia
- Phylum: Arthropoda
- Clade: Pancrustacea
- Class: Insecta
- Order: Lepidoptera
- Family: Tineidae
- Genus: Erechthias
- Species: E. crypsimima

Binomial name
- Erechthias crypsimima (Meyrick, 1920)

Synonyms
- Hectacma crypsimima Meyrick, 1920

= Erechthias crypsimima =

Species of moth endemic to New Zealand

Erechthias crypsimima is a species of moth in the family Tineidae. It was described by Edward Meyrick in 1920. This species is endemic to New Zealand and has been observed in the North Island. This species inhabits native forest and has been observed in Nothofagus fusca forest. The larvae likely feed on either deceased plant detritus or tough leaves of plants such as palms or flax. Adults are on the wing commonly from January to March. During the day, adults are known to rest on tree trunks where the moth's colouration helps provide protection by camouflaging the moth.

== Taxonomy ==
This species was first described by Edward Meyrick in 1920 using a specimen collected by George Hudson in Wellington in February and originally named Hectacma crypsimima. Hudson noted that he collected the type specimen of this species from the black trunk of a beech tree. Hudson discussed and illustrated this species in his 1928 book The butterflies and moths of New Zealand. In 1988 John S. Dugdale synonymised Hectacma with the genus Erechthias and thus since that date this species has been known as Erechthias crypsimima. The male holotype specimen is held at the Natural History Museum, London.

== Description ==
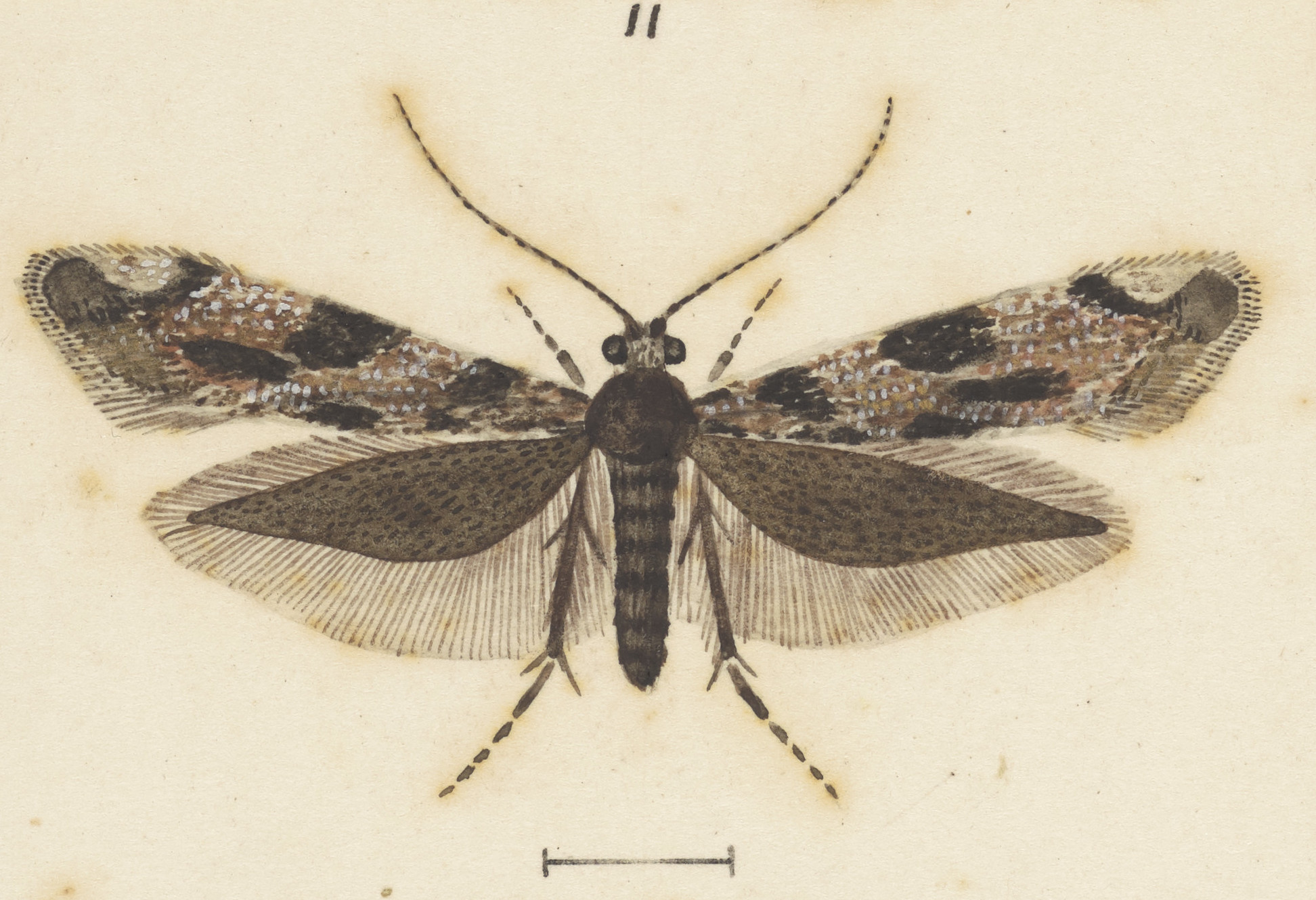
Illustration by Hudson.

Meyrick described this species as follows:

♂. 10 mm. Head grey mixed with whitish and blackish. Palpi dark fuscous. Thorax dark fuscous slightly speckled with whitish. Abdomen dark fuscous. Forewings elongate, rather narrow, costa gently arched, apex tolerably pointed, termen hardly rounded, extremely oblique; bronzy-brown, irregularly speckled with whitish except in posterior part of disc, with some scattered blackish scales; a very oblique blackish wedge-shaped streak from basal part of costa reaching half across wing; oblique blackish wedge-shaped spots from costa before middle and towards apex, and one from middle of dorsum; a small round blackish apical spot : cilia grey, whitish-tinged round apex, with two blackish lines. Hindwings and cilia dark fuscous.

Hudson pointed out that the colouration of this species provides protection by helping this species camouflage itself on the trunks of trees.

== Distribution ==
This species is endemic to New Zealand. This species has been observed in the North Island.

== Habitat and hosts ==
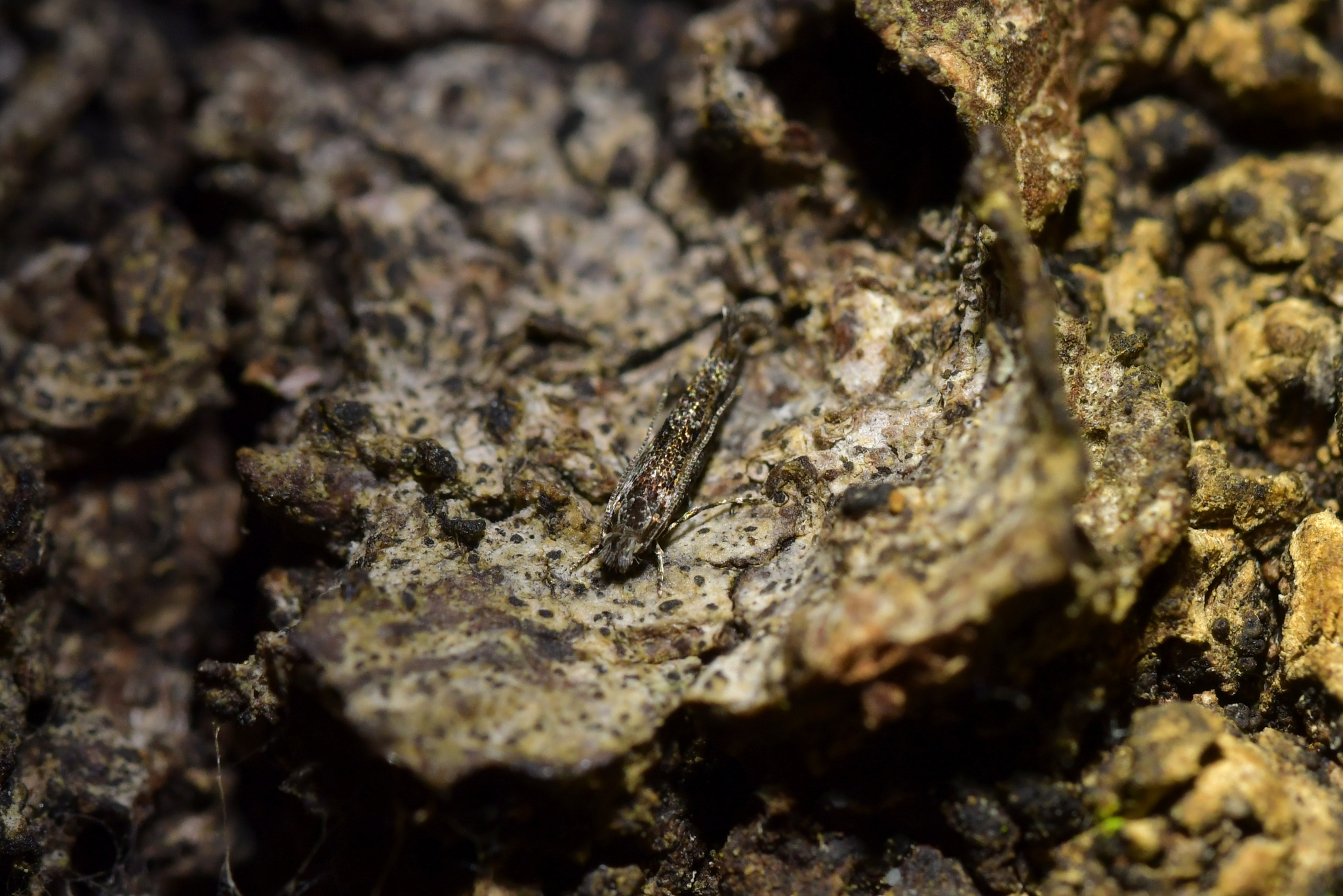
Protective colouration of E. crypsimima.

This species is known to inhabit native forest and has been observed in Nothofagus fusca forest. Larvae of species in the genus Erechthias feed on dead plant debris or the tough leaves of plants such as palms.

== Behaviour ==
Adults are on the wing from January to March. During the day adults are known to rest on the trunks of trees.
