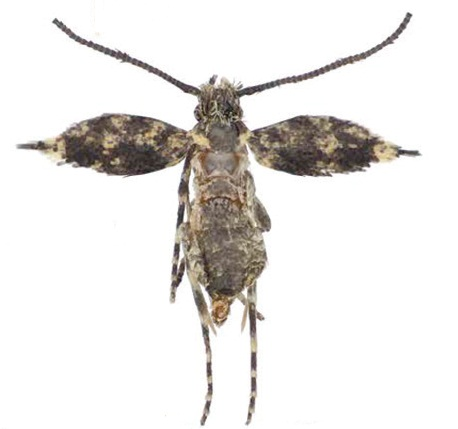

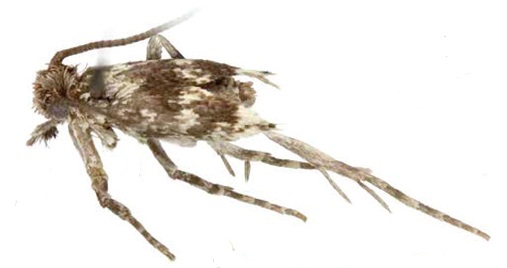

Scientific classification
- Kingdom: Animalia
- Phylum: Arthropoda
- Clade: Pancrustacea
- Class: Insecta
- Order: Lepidoptera
- Family: Tineidae
- Genus: Erechthias
- Species: E. grayi

Binomial name
- Erechthias grayi Davis & Mendel, 2013

= Erechthias grayi =

Species of moth

Erechthias grayi is a moth of the family Tineidae. It is endemic to Ascension Island.

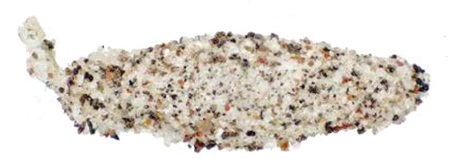
Larval case, dorsal view

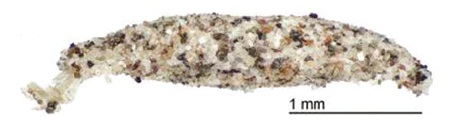
Larval case, lateral view

The length of the forewings is 1.4–1.8 mm. This wing reduction occurs in both sexes. It is one of the few species of Lepidoptera known where this extreme of brachyptery involving both sexes has evolved. The forewings are dark fuscous with an irregular scattering of dull white scales at the base of the wing and mostly crossing the wing beyond the middle. There is a slightly larger concentration of dull white scales at the apex and extending a short distance along the costa. The hindwings are minute, slightly variable in size and without scales.

The behavior of the moths in the field is unusual. They cling firmly to the bare rock, lichens and small plants in exposed situations and were only seen to move when disturbed, and then reluctantly. They only hop a few inches in a very bug-like manner.

The larvae are most likely lichenivorous. Several small (3.5–4.2 mm long) mature larval cases, some with pupal exuviae attached were collected under lichen covered rocks. It is likely that these are the larval cases of E. grayi. These cases are mostly white, speckled with small grains of sand and minute, dark fragments from the rocky substrate.

== Etymology ==
The species name is a patronym for Alan Gray, a botanist who assisted Howard Mendel with the collection of this species on Ascension Island.
