= Erechthias molynta =

Scientific classification
- Kingdom: Animalia
- Phylum: Arthropoda
- Clade: Pancrustacea
- Class: Insecta
- Order: Lepidoptera
- Family: Tineidae
- Genus: Erechthias
- Species: E. molynta

Binomial name
- Erechthias molynta (Meyrick, 1911)

Synonyms
- Decadarchis molynta Meyrick, 1911

Species of moth

Erechthias molynta is a moth of the family Tineidae. It was first described from the Seychelles, but is also found on the Chagos Archipelago.
