= Erechthias penicillata =

Scientific classification
- Kingdom: Animalia
- Phylum: Arthropoda
- Clade: Pancrustacea
- Class: Insecta
- Order: Lepidoptera
- Family: Tineidae
- Genus: Erechthias
- Species: E. penicillata

Binomial name
- Erechthias penicillata (Swezey, 1909)

Synonyms
- Decadarchis penicillata Swezey, 1909; Pantheus penicillata

Species of moth

Erechthias penicillata is a moth of the family Tineidae. It was first described by Otto Herman Swezey in 1909. It is found in the Pacific region, including French Polynesia and Hawaii.

The wingspan is about 10 mm.

The larvae feed in the dead leaves of Pandanus species.
