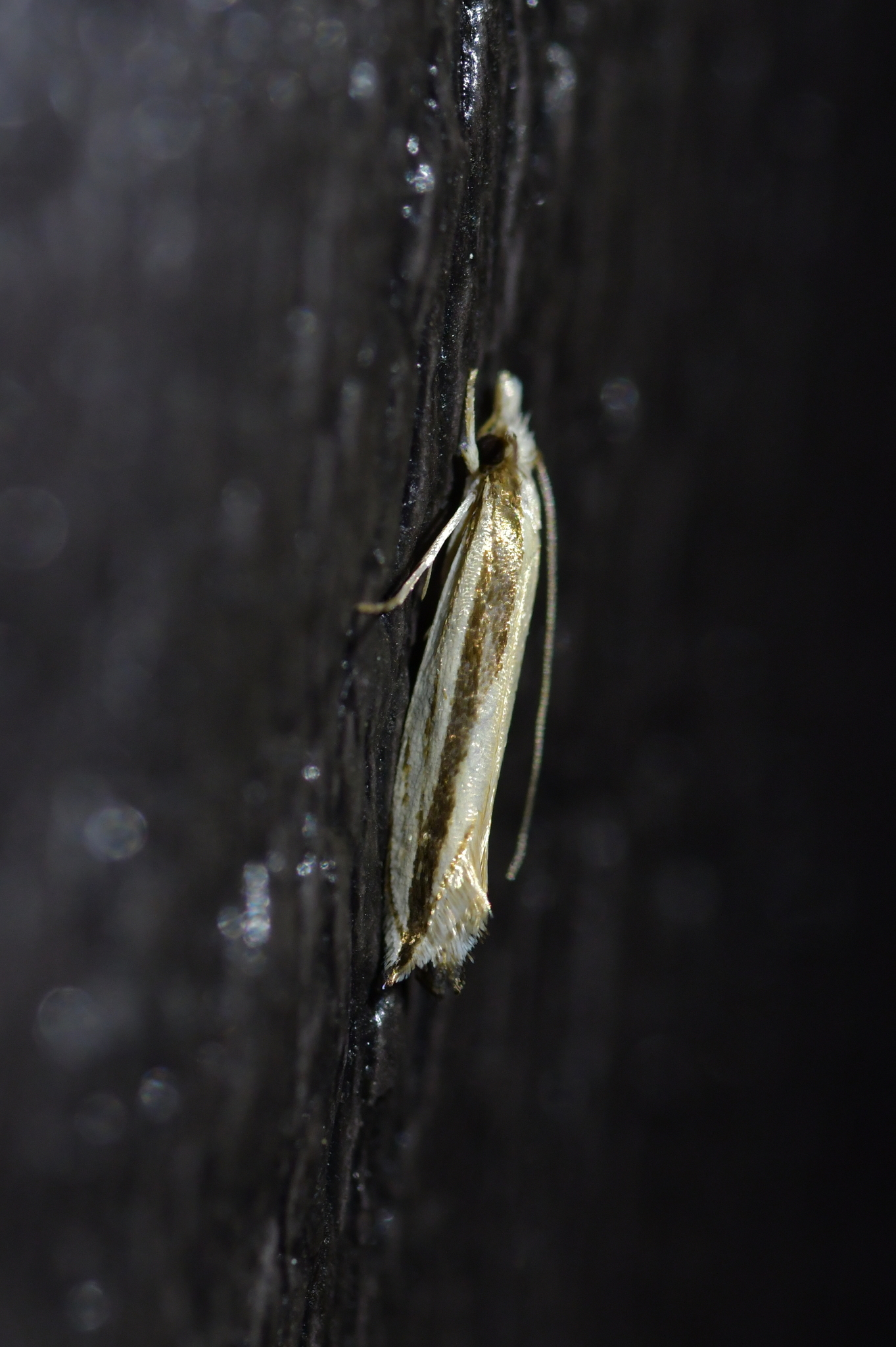

Scientific classification
- Kingdom: Animalia
- Phylum: Arthropoda
- Clade: Pancrustacea
- Class: Insecta
- Order: Lepidoptera
- Family: Tineidae
- Genus: Erechthias
- Species: E. stilbella

Binomial name
- Erechthias stilbella (Doubleday, 1843)

Synonyms
- Argyrotesia stilbella Doubleday, 1843; Hectacma stilbella (Doubleday, 1843)

= Erechthias stilbella =

Species of moth

Erechthias stilbella is a species of moth in the family Tineidae. It was first described by Edward Doubleday in 1843. This species is endemic to New Zealand and is found in the North and South Islands. This species inhabits native forest and bush and can also be found in domestic gardens. Larvae feed on dead plant debris or tough leaves of plants such as palms. Adults are on the wing from October until March. Adults rest on tree trunks or fences during the day.

== Taxonomy ==
This species was first described by Edward Doubleday in 1843 using a specimen collected by A. Sinclair at Auckland and named Argyrotesia stilbella. In 1880 Meyrick placed this species in Erechthias. In 1915 Meryick then went on to place this species in the genus Hectacma. George Hudson discussed and illustrated this species in his 1928 book The butterflies and moths of New Zealand under that name. In 1988 John S. Dugdale synonymised Hectacma with the genus Erechthias and thus this species returned to the name Erechthias stilbella. The type specimen is not at the Natural History Museum, London but Dugdale states a specimen collected by Edward Meyrick and dated 3/14 is topotypic.

== Description ==
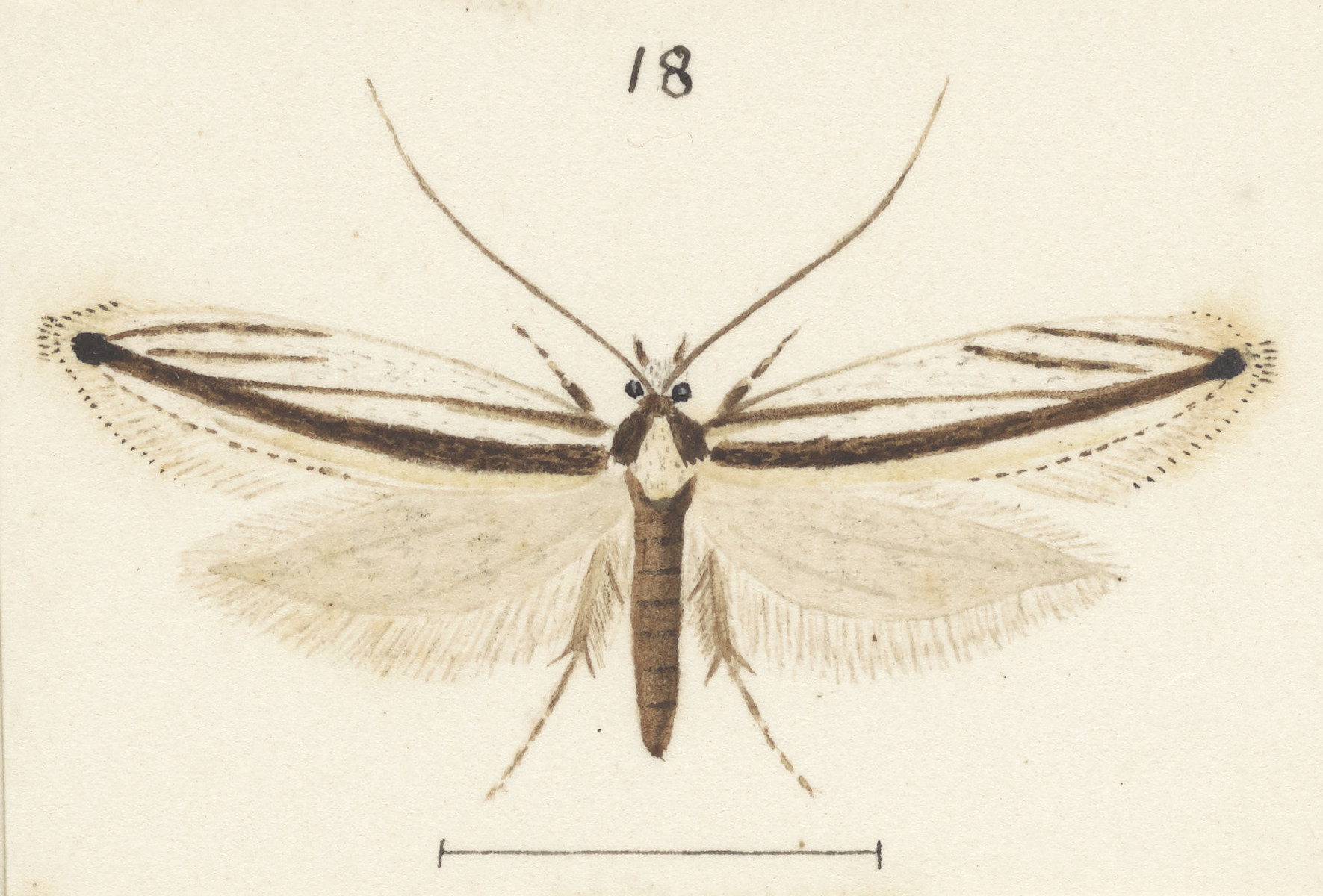
Illustration by Hudson.

Hudson described this species as follows:

The expansion of the wings is slightly under 3/4 inch. The fore-wings are cream-coloured, faintly tinged with ochreous on the dorsum; there is a broad deep bronzy-black stripe from the base to the apex, running parallel with the dorsum; a very fine curved line from the costa et the base, joining the central stripe at about #; another very fine line from the costa at about 3/4 almost reaching the central stripe; a fine line along the costal edge from 3/4 to the apex and a black spot at the apex. The hind-wings are pale grey.

Although this species is similar in appearance to E. chasmatias it differs as its markings are very differently arranged.

== Distribution ==
This species is endemic to New Zealand. It is found in the North and South Islands.

== Habitat and hosts ==
This species inhabits native forests and bush. It can also be found in domestic gardens. Larvae of species in the genus Erechthias feed on dead plant debris or the tough leaves of plants such as palms. Adults were reared from larvae in the gall of a wattle tree.

== Behaviour ==
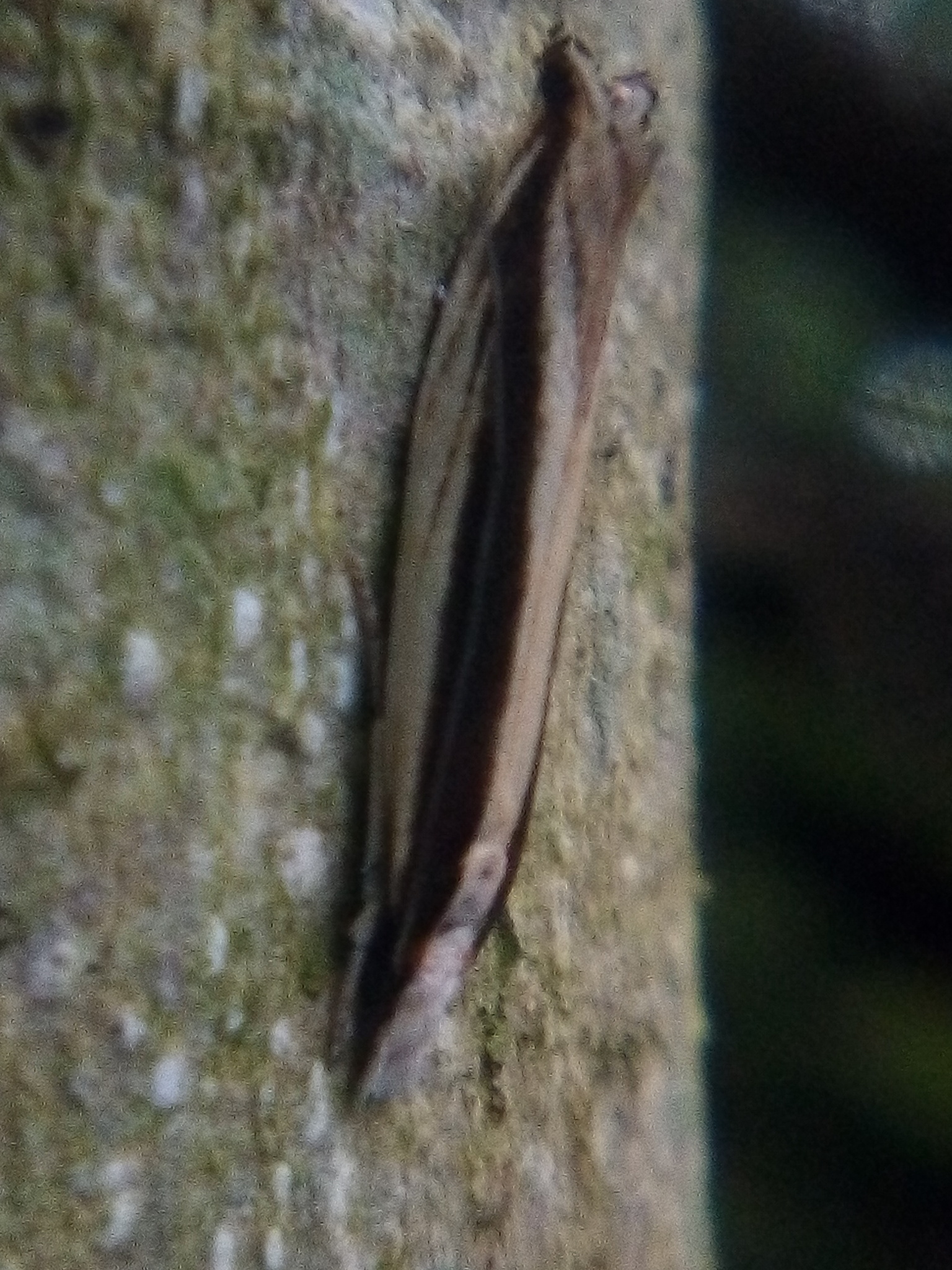
E. stilbella at rest on tree trunk.

Adults are on the wing from October until March. Adults rest on tree trunks or fences during the day.
