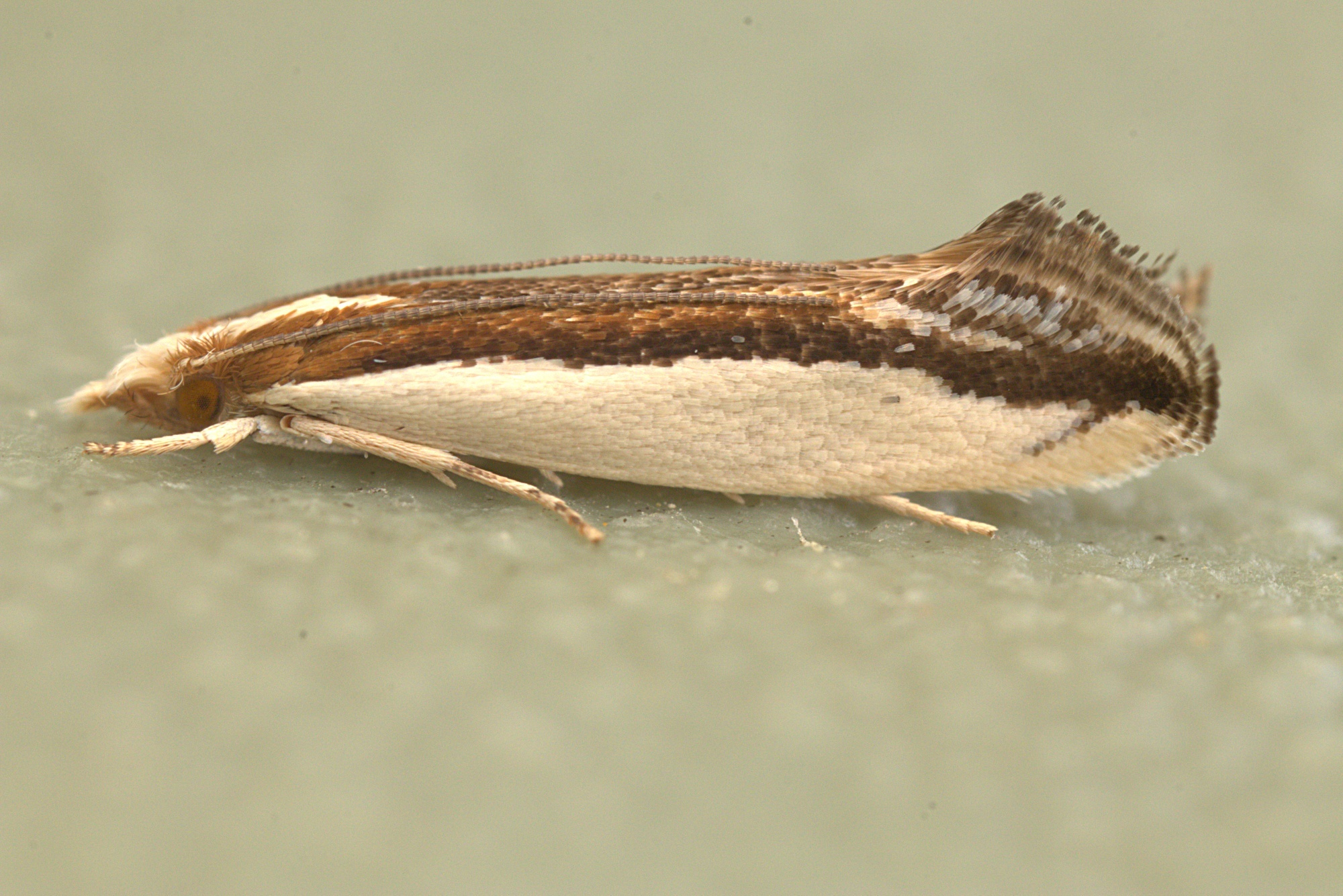

Scientific classification
- Kingdom: Animalia
- Phylum: Arthropoda
- Clade: Pancrustacea
- Class: Insecta
- Order: Lepidoptera
- Family: Tineidae
- Genus: Erechthias
- Species: E. chionodira

Binomial name
- Erechthias chionodira Meyrick, 1880

Synonyms
- Hectacma chionodira (Meyrick, 1880)

= Erechthias chionodira =

Species of moth endemic to New Zealand

Erechthias chionodira is a species of moth of the family Tineidae. It was first described by Edward Meyrick in 1880. This species is endemic to New Zealand and has been observed on both the North and South Islands. E. chionodira inhabits native forest. Larvae likely feed on dead plant debris or on the tough leaves of plants such as flax. Adults are on the wing from September until February. During the day they can be seen at rest on tree trunks or fences. Adults are attracted to light.

== Taxonomy ==
This was first described by Edward Meyrick in 1880 using two specimens obtained at the Auckland Domain in Auckland on a shady bank amongst forest in January. In 1915 Meyrick placed this species in the genus Hectacma. In 1927 Philpott studied and illustrated the male genitalia of this species. George Hudson discussed and illustrated this species in his 1928 book The butterflies and moths of New Zealand under that name. In 1988 John S. Dugdale synonymised Hectacma with the genus Erechthias and thus this species returned to the name Erechthias chasmatias. The male lectotype is held at the Natural History Museum, London.

== Description ==
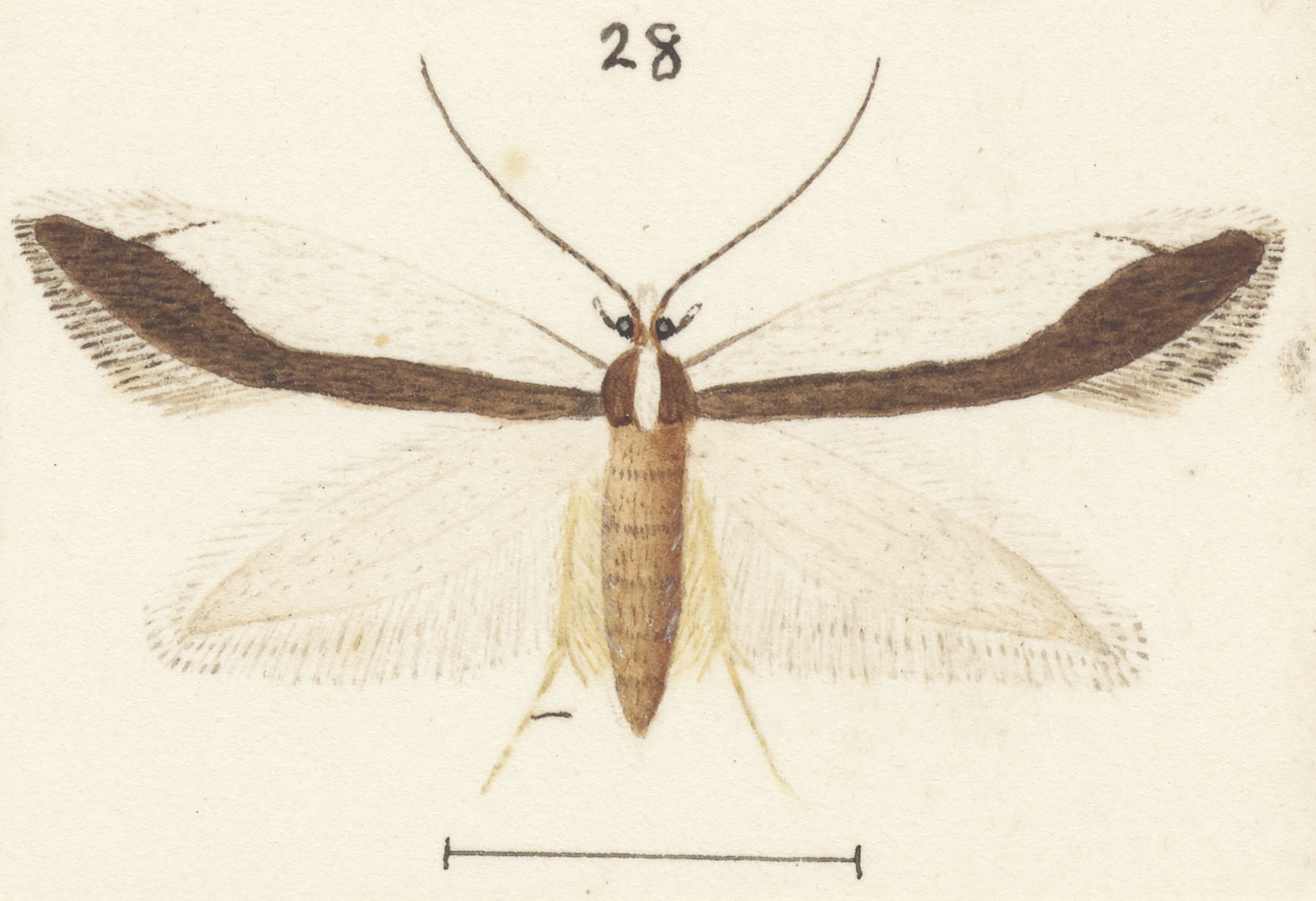
Illustration of female.

The adult of this species was described by Meyrick as follows:

♂♀. 4 1/2"-5 1/2". Head white, sides of crown narrowly brownish-ochreous. Palpi white, second joint of labial palpi dark fuscous externally except at apex, both joints loosely haired. Antennae whitish, with obsolete dark fuscous annulations. Thorax ochreous brown, with a narrow white longitudinal central stripe. Abdomen whitish-ochreous. Legs white, anterior tibiae and tarsi obscurely suffused with dark fuscous above, middle tarsi with dark fuscous rings at base of joints. Fore-wings glossy snow-white; a broad ochreous-brown streak along inner-margin from base to anal angle, posteriorly attenuated, containing some blackish, scales on inner margin; this streak is margined above by a blackish streak, commencing at base as a slender line and dilating gradually to anal angle, where it is as broad as the inner-marginal streak in middle, thence continued along hind-margin to apex, its upper edge obtusely dilated about middle of hind-margin, produced into apical cilia as a short straight projecting bar; base of costa slenderly blackish; a small cloudy subcostal blackish spot before middle; two slender blackish oblique streaks from costa, first beyond middle, very short, nearly obsolete, second midway between first and apex, longer, its apex confluent with the hind-marginal streak; cilia whitish, with three broad cloudy blackish-fuscous lines. Hind-wings and cilia white, extreme apex and two obscure lines round it fuscous.

This species varies considerably in size.

== Distribution ==
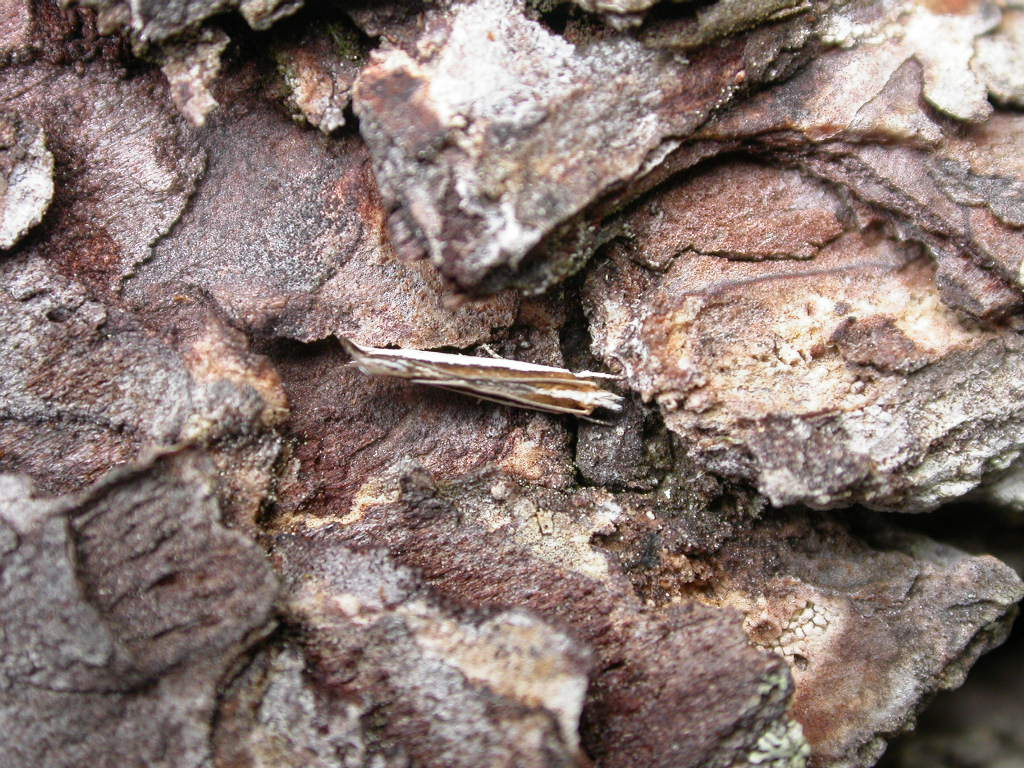
E. chionodira resting on trunk of tree

This species is endemic to New Zealand. It has been observed in the North IsIand and west coast of the South Island.

== Habitat and hosts ==
This species inhabits native forest. Larvae of species in the genus Erechthias feed on dead plant debris or the tough leaves of plants such as palms or flax.

== Behaviour ==
Adults are on the wing from September until February. During the day they can be observed resting on tree trunks or fences where their colouration provides surprisingly good camouflage. At night this moth is attracted to light.
