= Erechthias beeblebroxi =

Scientific classification
- Kingdom: Animalia
- Phylum: Arthropoda
- Clade: Pancrustacea
- Class: Insecta
- Order: Lepidoptera
- Family: Tineidae
- Genus: Erechthias
- Species: E. beeblebroxi

Binomial name
- Erechthias beeblebroxi Robinson & Nielsen, 1993

Species of moth

Erechthias beeblebroxi is a moth of the family Tineidae. It is endemic to Australia, where it has been recorded from Queensland.

The species was described in 1993 from individuals collected near Cooktown and Yeppoon in Queensland, Australia. The wingspan is 13–14 mm for males and 11.5–12.5 mm for females. Adults have been recorded on wing in October.

The name of the species is a reference to the fictional two-headed character Zaphod Beeblebrox in The Hitchhiker's Guide to the Galaxy: Erechthias beeblebroxi has markings that resemble a second head.
