= E. darwinii =

E. darwinii may refer to:

- Eugenia darwinii
- Eustephia darwinii

== See also ==
- E. darwini (disambiguation)
- Darwinii (disambiguation)
