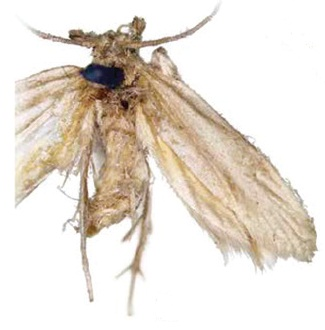

Scientific classification
- Kingdom: Animalia
- Phylum: Arthropoda
- Clade: Pancrustacea
- Class: Insecta
- Order: Lepidoptera
- Family: Tineidae
- Genus: Erechthias
- Species: E. darwini

Binomial name
- Erechthias darwini G.S. Robinson, 1983

= Erechthias darwini =

Species of moth

Erechthias darwini is a moth of the family Tineidae. It is endemic to St. Paul’s Rocks, a group of 15 small islets and rocks in the central equatorial Atlantic Ocean. It was first recorded by Charles Darwin.

The length of the forewings is about 6 mm. Adults are small and brown.

The larvae have been collected from seabird nests where they probably feed on seaweed.
