= Ōtari-Wilton's Bush =

Botanic garden in Wellington, New Zealand

Ōtari Native Botanic Garden and Wilton's Bush Forest Reserve
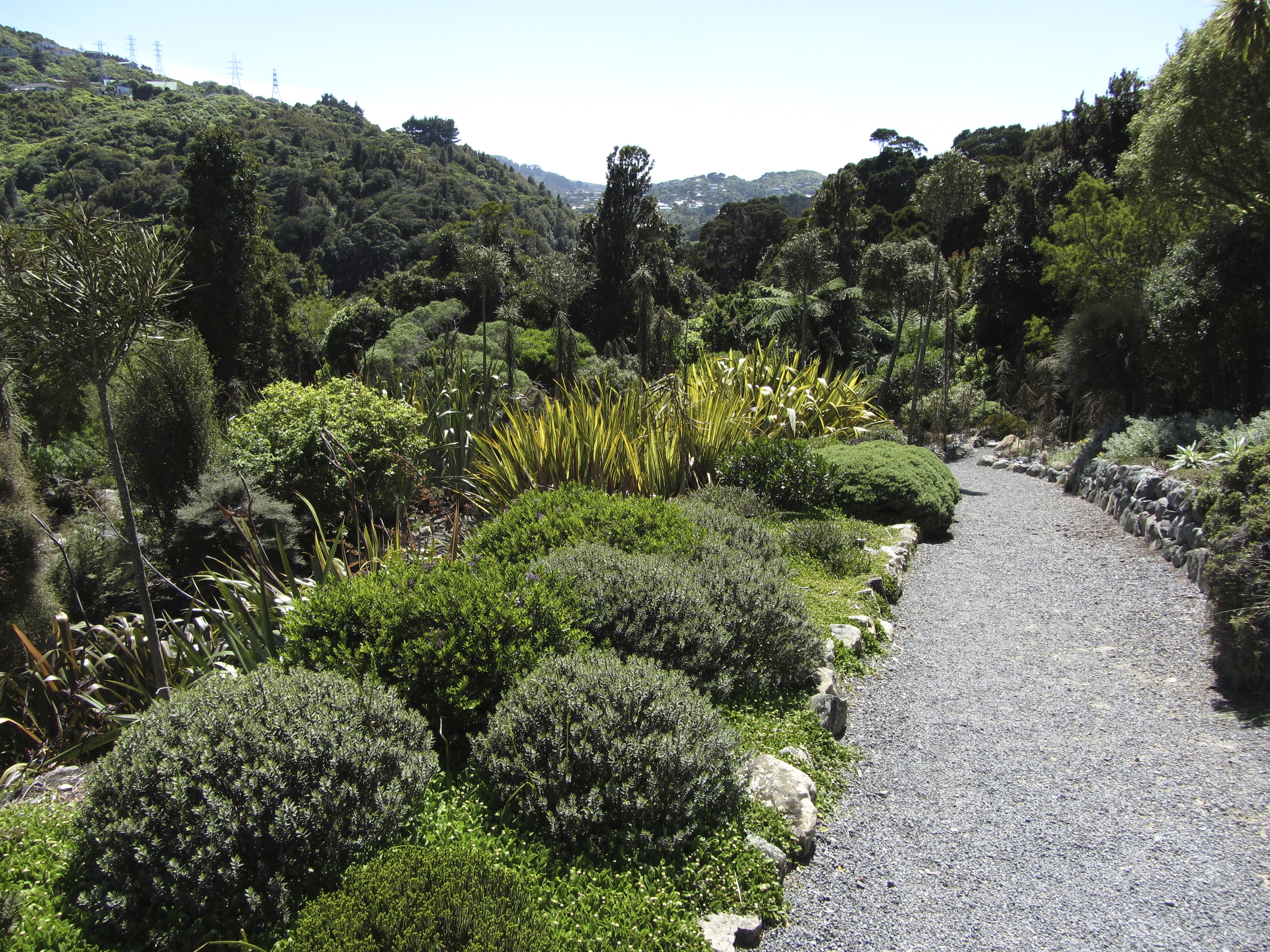
- Pathway through the botanic garden
- Interactive map of Ōtari Native Botanic Garden and Wilton's Bush Forest Reserve
- Type: Native plant botanical garden
- Location: Wellington, New Zealand
- Coordinates: 41.26733°S 174.75863°E
- Area: 105 hectares (260 acres)
- Operator: Wellington City Council
- Species: ~1,200
- Website: wellingtongardens.nz/our-gardens/otari-wiltons-bush/

Ōtari-Wilton's Bush is a native botanic garden and forest reserve located in the suburb of Wilton in Wellington, New Zealand. It is New Zealand's only public botanic garden dedicated solely to the native plants of New Zealand. The reserve includes 100 ha (250 acres) of native forest, and 5 ha (12 acres) of plant collections. The first section of what would become Ōtari-Wilton's Bush was purchased in 1906 by the government and designated as a scenic reserve. The first director of the reserve was botanist Leonard Cockayne, who alongside John Gretton Mackenzie established the Ōtari Open-Air Native Plant Museum in 1926. The forest in the reserve contains some of the oldest trees in Wellington, including an 800-year-old rimu. The reserve holds a broad range of plants, with one bioblitz recording nearly 500 species of vascular plants, liverworts, mosses and lichens. In addition to its extensive flora, the reserve also hosts a wide range of fauna, including notable species such as ornate skink (Oligosoma ornatum), longfin eel (Anguilla dieffenbachii) and glowworm (Arachnocampa luminosa). The reserve undergoes regular pest control to minimise the effects of invasive species such as possums and rats. Due to its diverse plant collection and reserve biodiversity, scientific research is regularly conducted at Ōtari-Wilton. Ōtari-Wilton's Bush is owned and managed by Wellington City Council and is supported by the Ōtari-Wilton's Bush Trust.

== History ==
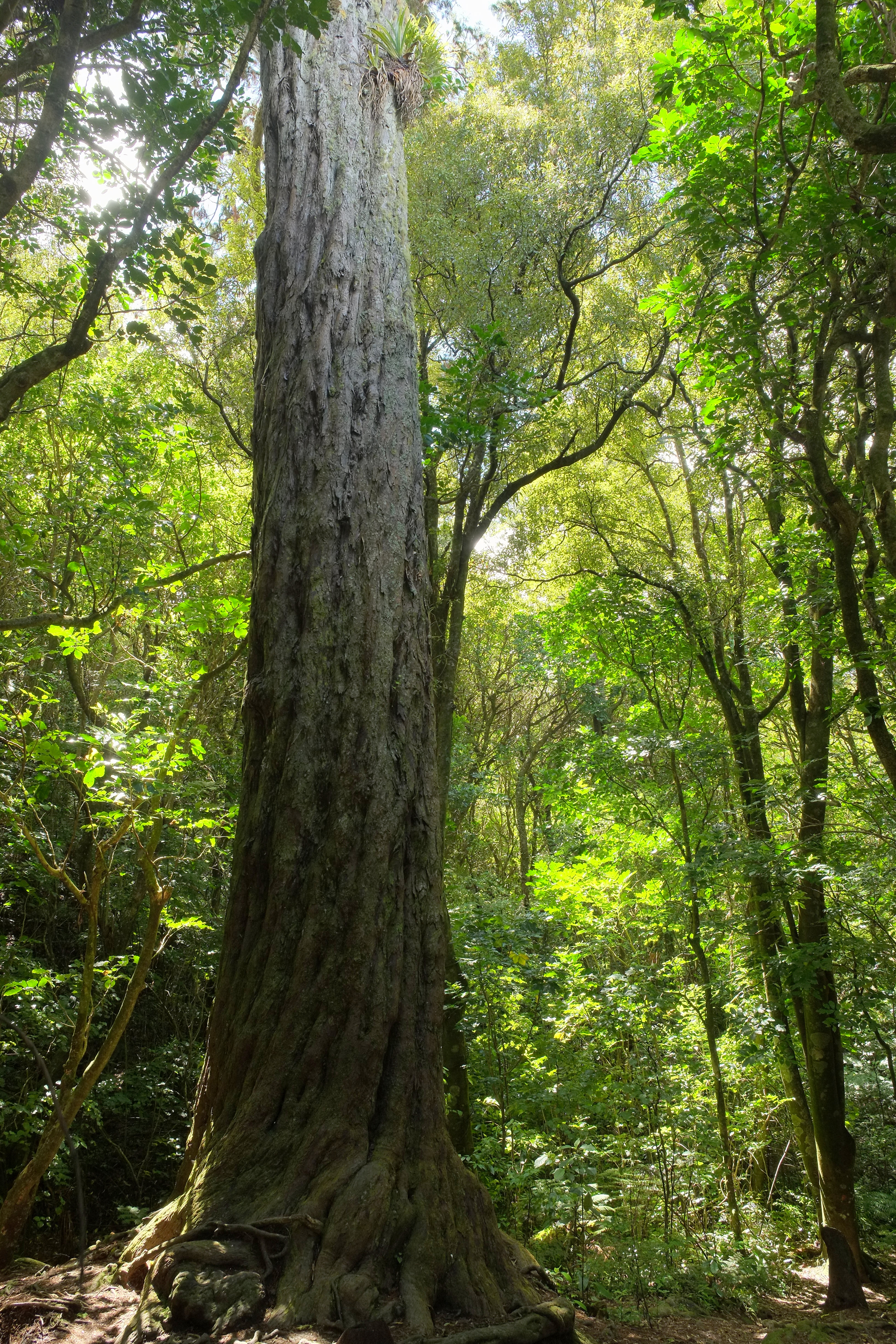
Trunk of an 800-year-old rimu

The original forest in the area surrounding Ōtari-Wilton's Bush was a podocarp broadleaf forest. The area was known and used by successive iwi as a good place to gather food and catch prey, and this gives rise to the Māori name Ōtarikākā ('place of snares to trap kākā') shortened to Ōtari. (Note: The majority of recent independent sources use the spelling Ōtari with the diacritic. Older sources do not use the diacritic. For consistency in this article, all occurrences in the body of the article use the diacritic, but where the name appears in the title of a reference, it is presented in the form used in the cited source.) Large trees in the wider area were felled for timber when European settlers arrived in the region, and farms were established.

In 1847 the Ōtari Native Reserve was a 200 ha (500 acres) block of unsurveyed land between Kaiwharawhara and the Makara valley that was set aside to enable the Crown to offer land swaps to local Māori in exchange for pā sites at Kaiwharawhara, Ōwhāriu and Pipitea. From the 1850s there was a rapid decline in the Māori population in Wellington.

Settler Job Wilton arrived in Wellington in 1841 as a seven-year-old boy. He married Ellen Curtis in Wellington in 1860, and they purchased 44 ha (108 acres) in the Kaiwharawhara valley. Wilton had been concerned about the large-scale land clearance around Wellington in the 1840s and 50s and the loss of native forest. He set aside 6.9 ha (17 acres) of untouched forest near his homestead, and fenced it to protect it from stock. This became known as Wilton's Bush, and was a popular area for picnickers and day trippers.

In 1902, the Māori owners of a block of native forest in the Ōtari Native Reserve wished to lease their land, and this raised concerns that the forest would be cleared. A deputation including Job Wilton, two mayors, and three members of Parliament met with the Minister of Lands to ask for steps to preserve the land for the benefit of the public. The New Zealand Times supported the proposal, describing Wilton's Bush as:

... one of the very few natural beauty spots in the vicinity of Wellington which has escaped the axe and the fire-stick. As it stands, it is an admirable place of resort for picnic parties and lovers of the picturesque ...

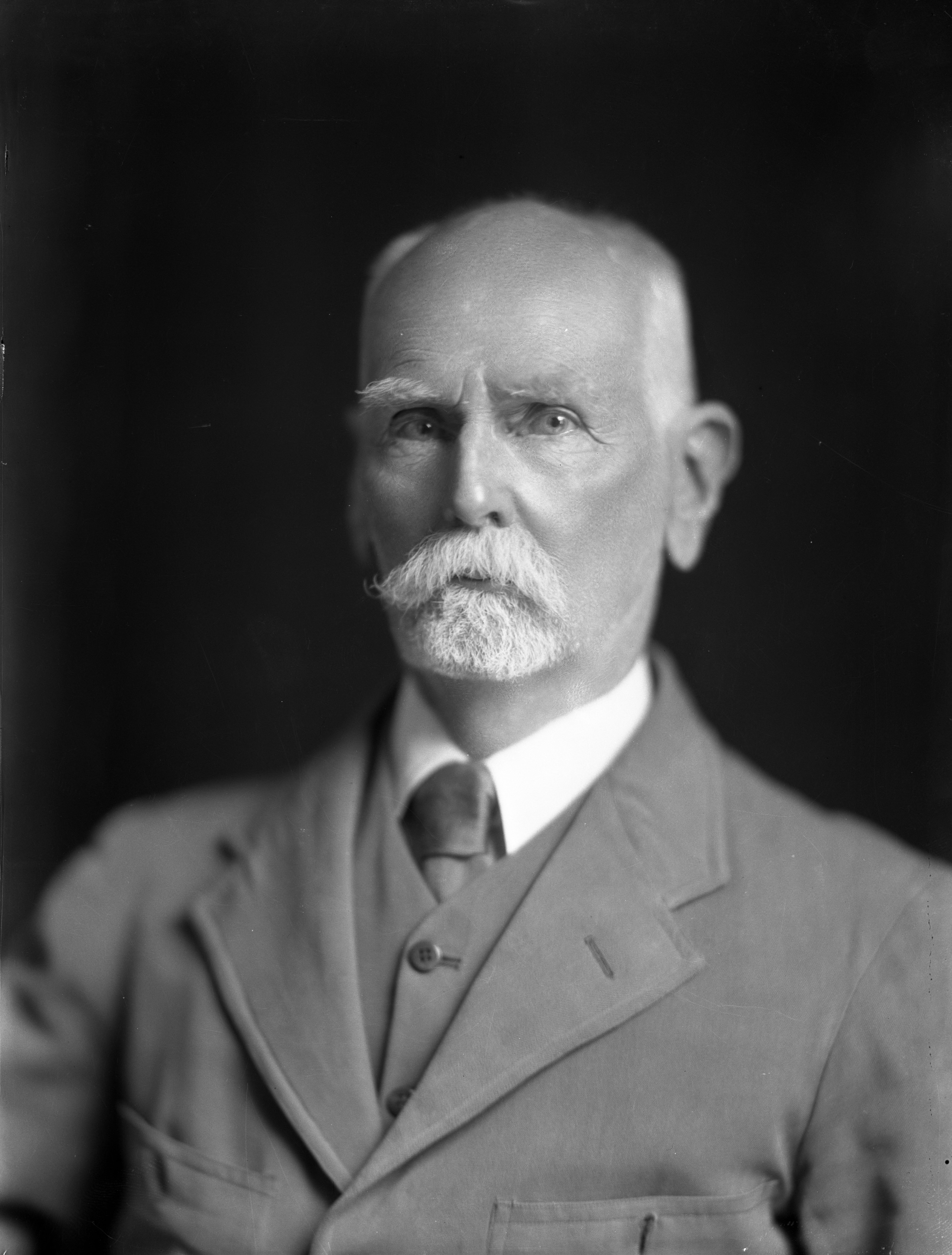
Leonard Cockayne, the first director of the reserve

In 1906 the government bought 54.5 hectares (135 acres) of land in the Ōtari Native Reserve from its Māori owners and designated it as a scenic reserve, naming it Ōtari-Wilton's Bush Scenic Reserve. The land was later transferred to Wellington City Council in 1918 for "recreation purposes and for the preservation of native flora". In 1918, John Gretton Mackenzie was appointed as the new Director of Parks and Reserves for Wellington. When Mackenzie commenced in October that year, he immediately put a stop to cattle grazing in the reserve, noting that grazing removes undergrowth and allows wind to pass through the forest. By 1920, new paths had been created through the reserve.

=== Ōtari Open-Air Native Plant Museum ===
By 1926, the site was known as the Ōtari Open-Air Native Plant Museum. The first director of the reserve was Leonard Cockayne. In 1926 he worked with John Gretton Mackenzie on plans for the open-air plant museum. Mackenzie was a keen supporter of a proposal put forward at a meeting of the New Zealand Institute of Horticulture in March 1926 to create a native plant museum. In June 1926, Mackenzie and Cockayne, who was honorary botanist to the institute, prepared a report to the Wellington City Council for the development of an open-air native plant museum at Ōtari. Cockayne's report stated:

The object of this scheme is to present a vivid picture of the plant-life of New Zealand—so different from that of any other country—and the species of which it is composed, together with the use of such for the adornment of gardens. If carried out [...] there would be in the city of Wellington an open-air museum the like of which has never been attempted before, not only in this country but in any part of the world. [...] Each species would be accurately labelled with its name, its habitat, and its distribution in New Zealand. There would also be grown the various hybrids and varieties of the species. Thus the whole flora of New Zealand could be seen at a glance, as it were, and the plants could be admired and studied in detail.

Cockayne formed a rough plan for how the reserve should be structured, focusing on four key aspects that encapsulate plant life in New Zealand:

- Create a collection with every native plant species in New Zealand, with the species ordered by family and genus.
- Recreate representative ecosystems of notable flora groups, such as subalpine scrub, coastal thickets and kauri groves.
- Use plantings to demonstrate how native plants can be utilised in gardens.
- Restoring the forest remnant to its natural state.

In 1928, the eminent botanist Arthur William Hill, director of the Royal Botanic Gardens, Kew, visited Ōtari while on a trip to New Zealand and even went on botanical trips with Cockayne. The Troup Picnic area adjacent to the Kaiwharawhara Stream was named in honour of George Troup, a distinguished architect and 23rd Mayor of Wellington.

=== 1991 to present ===
The name of the reserve was changed to Ōtari Native Botanic Garden in 1991, then Ōtari-Wilton's Bush Native Botanic Garden and Forest Reserve in 1999, before finally being renamed Ōtari-Wilton's Bush in 2000, recognising the influences of both Māori and Europeans.

From 1997 to 1999, improvements were made to visitor facilities and access around the gardens, with the objective of Ōtari becoming a visitor attraction. A tree-top canopy walkway was constructed over a stream gully, linking the car park and information centre with the Cockayne Lawn and gardens to the west. The bridge improved the connection between the information centre and collections, and avoided visitors having to walk along Wilton Road to visit these areas. The redevelopment also included a new alpine rock garden with a small tarn, and new visitor facilities at the information centre. A waharoa (gateway) carved by Bryce Manukonga was installed at the entrance. The redevelopment project was funded by a $1.2 million grant from the Plimmer Bequest, with an additional $300,000 from Wellington City Council. The redeveloped facilities and information centre were officially opened at dawn on 9 October 1999. By 2005, there were around 95,000 visitors to Ōtari-Wilton's Bush each year.

A track alongside the Kaiwharawhara Stream had been cleared for the upgrading of a sewer line in 1991, but by 2000 the section upstream from the Troup Picnic area had become almost impassable because of the growth of blackberry and weeds. In the early 2000s, the Otari-Wilton's Bush Care Group began clearing the track and planted over 20,000 native plants alongside the stream to revegetate the area and restore the environment. In 2004, Wellington City Council purchased a block of Ministry of Education land below Ōtari School to add to Ōtari-Wilton's Bush. The pine trees on the land were removed and replaced with natives.

== Forest reserve ==
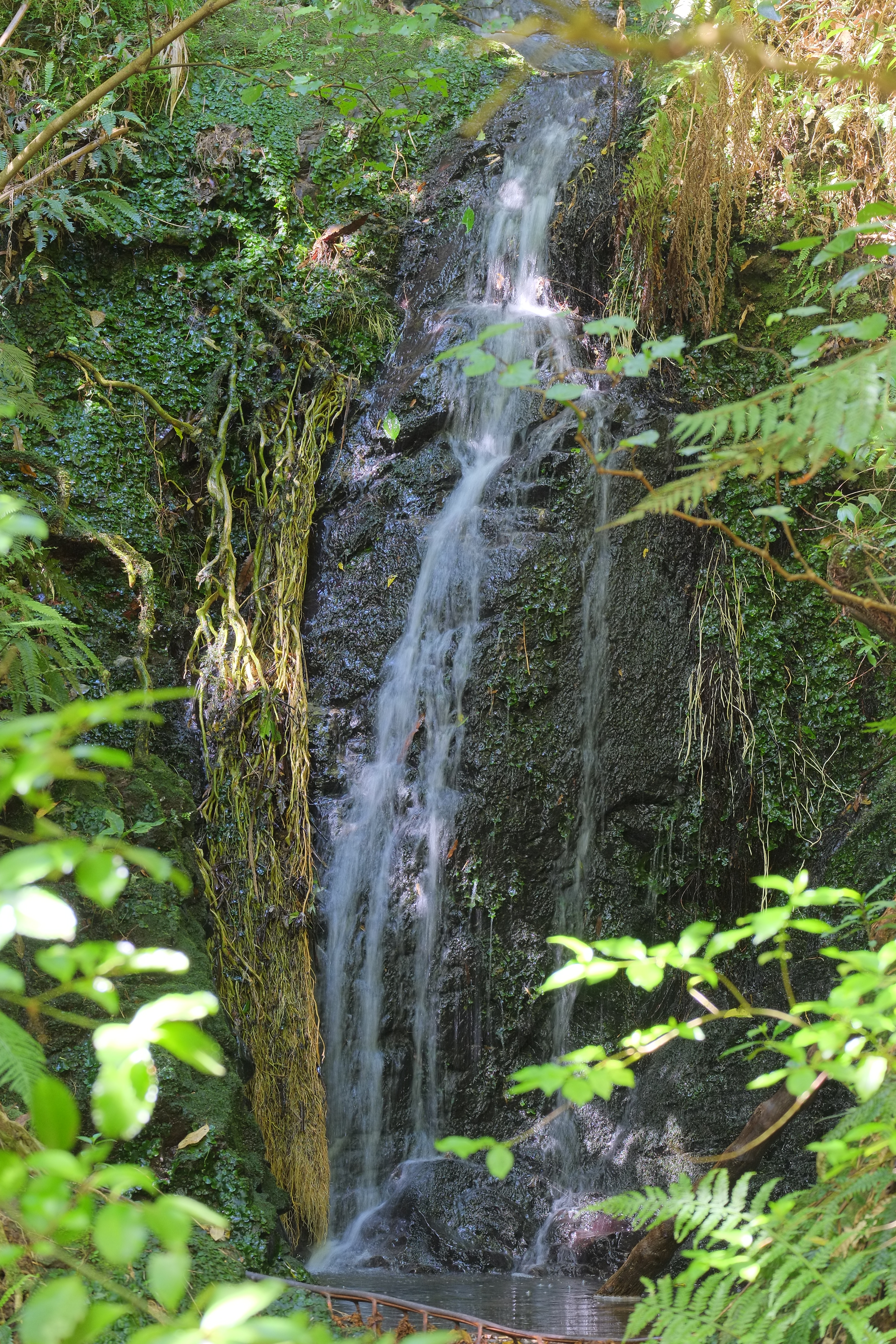
Waterfall in Ōtari-Wilton's Bush

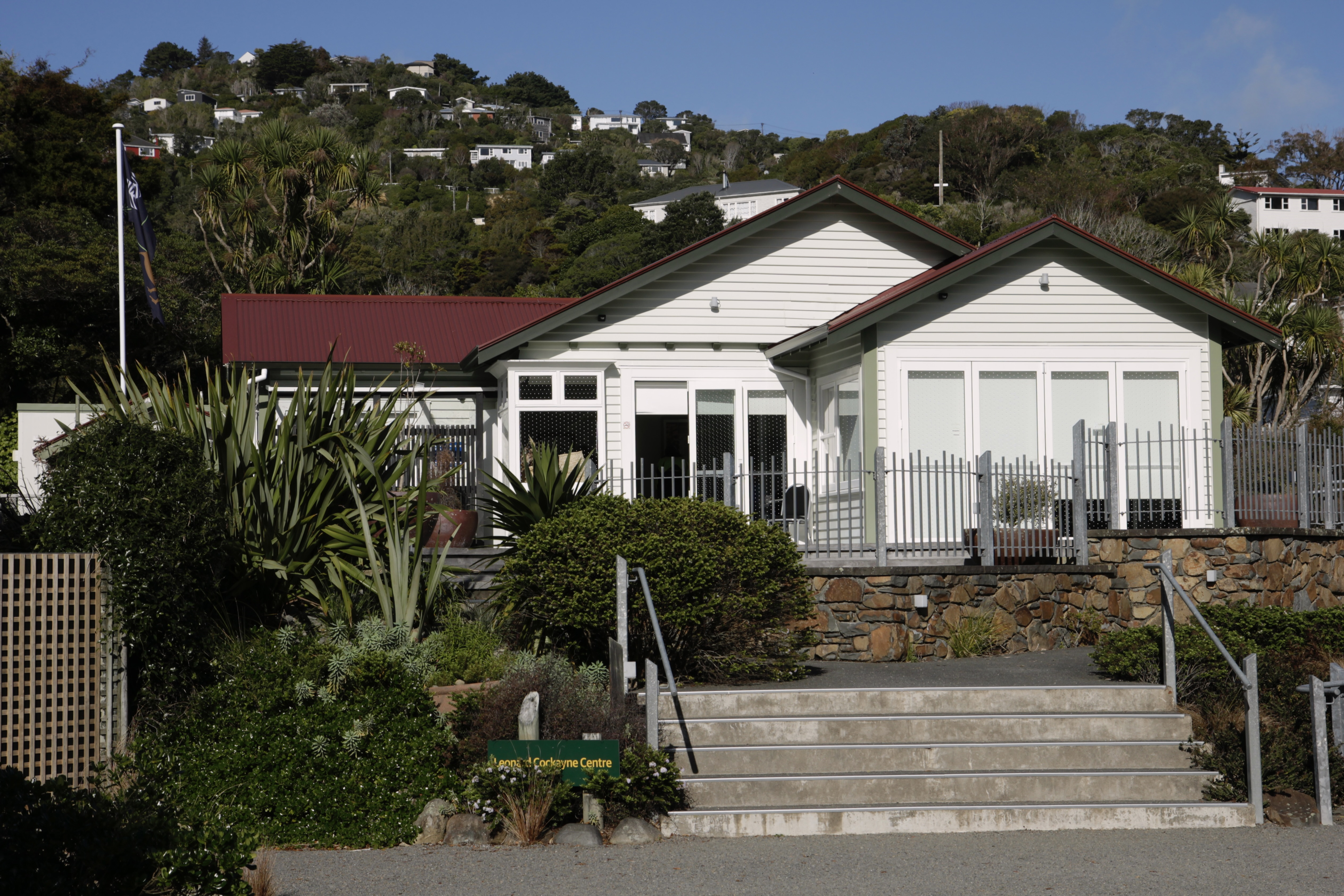
Leonard Cockayne Centre, Ōtari-Wilton's Bush

The forest at Ōtari-Wilton's Bush covers around 100 hectares (250 acres) of the catchment area of the northeast flowing Kaiwharawhara Stream. The area includes several gullies and side streams, some with small waterfalls, and is surrounded by hills up to 280 m (920 ft) above sea level. The underlying rock is greywacke, and the vegetation includes original podocarp broadleaf forest, semi-coastal kohekohe (Didymocheton spectabilis) forest and regenerating forest and scrub. Larger trees in the forest include podocarps such as mataī (Prumnopitys taxifolia), miro (Pectinopitys ferruginea), tōtara (Podocarpus totara) and rimu (Dacrydium cupressinum). The forest contains some of the oldest trees in Wellington, examples of which can be seen from the canopy walkway. One notable example of these trees is an 800-year-old rimu named "Moko". The tree is around 27.3 m (90 ft) high, 5.58 m (18.3 ft) wide and has a crown spread of 15 m (49 ft). At the base of the tree is a platform that was constructed in 2019 to protect the tree and enable viewing by visitors. The larger trees will often have perching plants (epiphytes) in higher branches. Climbing plants are also common throughout, including supplejack (Ripogonum scandens), New Zealand passionfruit (Passiflora tetrandra), and several species of rātā (Metrosideros). On the upper slopes, the predominant trees are māhoe (Melicytus ramiflorus), rewarewa (Knightia excelsa), tawa (Beilschmiedia tawa) and kohekohe, with some forest remnants of mataī and rimu. In damp areas, there are pukatea (Laurelia novae-zelandiae) that typically have large plank buttress roots to support their growth.

The high south-facing slopes in the reserve are covered in regenerating scrub that is dominated by introduced plants such as gorse (Ulex europaeus) and Darwin's barberry (Berberis darwinii), although native plants such as rangiora (Brachyglottis repanda) and māhoe can also be found.

In 2007, a BioBlitz was held to "increase public awareness and to generate scientific knowledge" of the biodiversity within Ōtari-Wilton's Bush in celebration of its one hundred year anniversary. Nearly 500 species of vascular plants, liverworts, mosses and lichens were recorded during the 24 hours of the BioBlitz including a number of new records, such as the flowering plant Veronica javanica and the liverwort Marchantia polymorpha subsp. ruderalis.

=== Pest control ===
Possums were introduced to the Wellington region in the 1880s and have since devastated the environment by feeding on native plants and animals. In 1928, Leonard Cockayne began a possum control program at Ōtari-Wilton to limit their impact. This program continued for decades, but in the 1990s it was determined that there were still twelve possums per hectare in the reserve. In response to this, the Greater Wellington Regional Council began intensively poisoning possums with cyanide traps in 1993, killing over 800 of them. After this, hockey-stick bait stations filled with poison were installed throughout the reserve and possums are now rarely seen. Other mammalian pests such as rats and mustelids are also targeted with traps. To combat these pests, the Ōtari-Wilton's Bush Trust was gifted DOC200 predator traps, which were laid out through areas of the reserve and are maintained by volunteers.

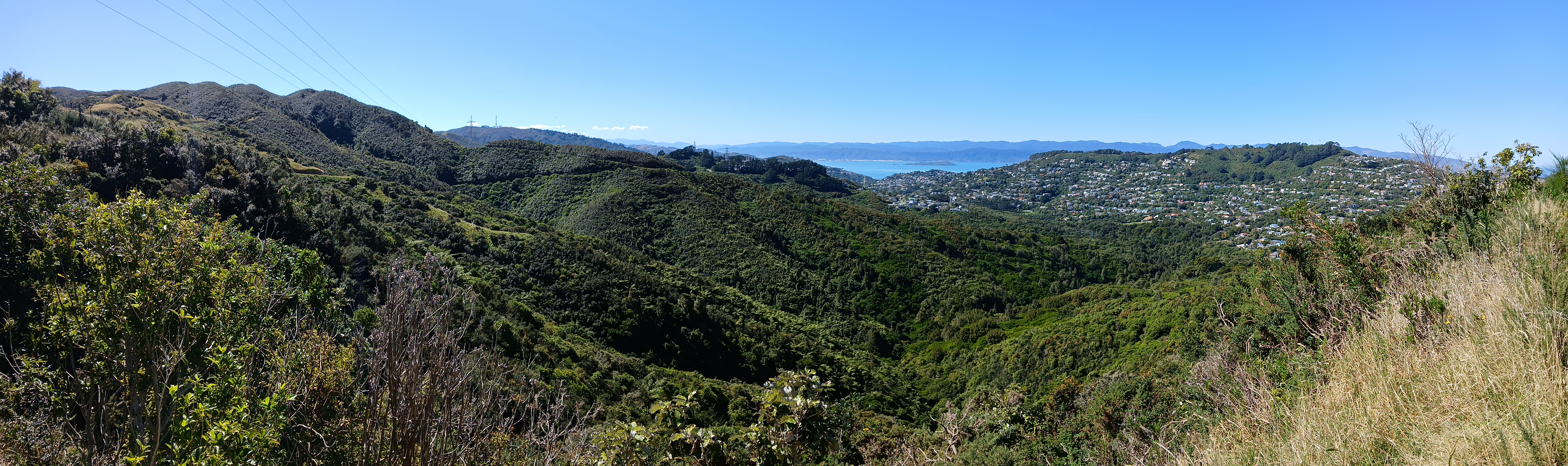
Ōtari-Wilton Bush as viewed from the skyline track

== Native botanic gardens ==
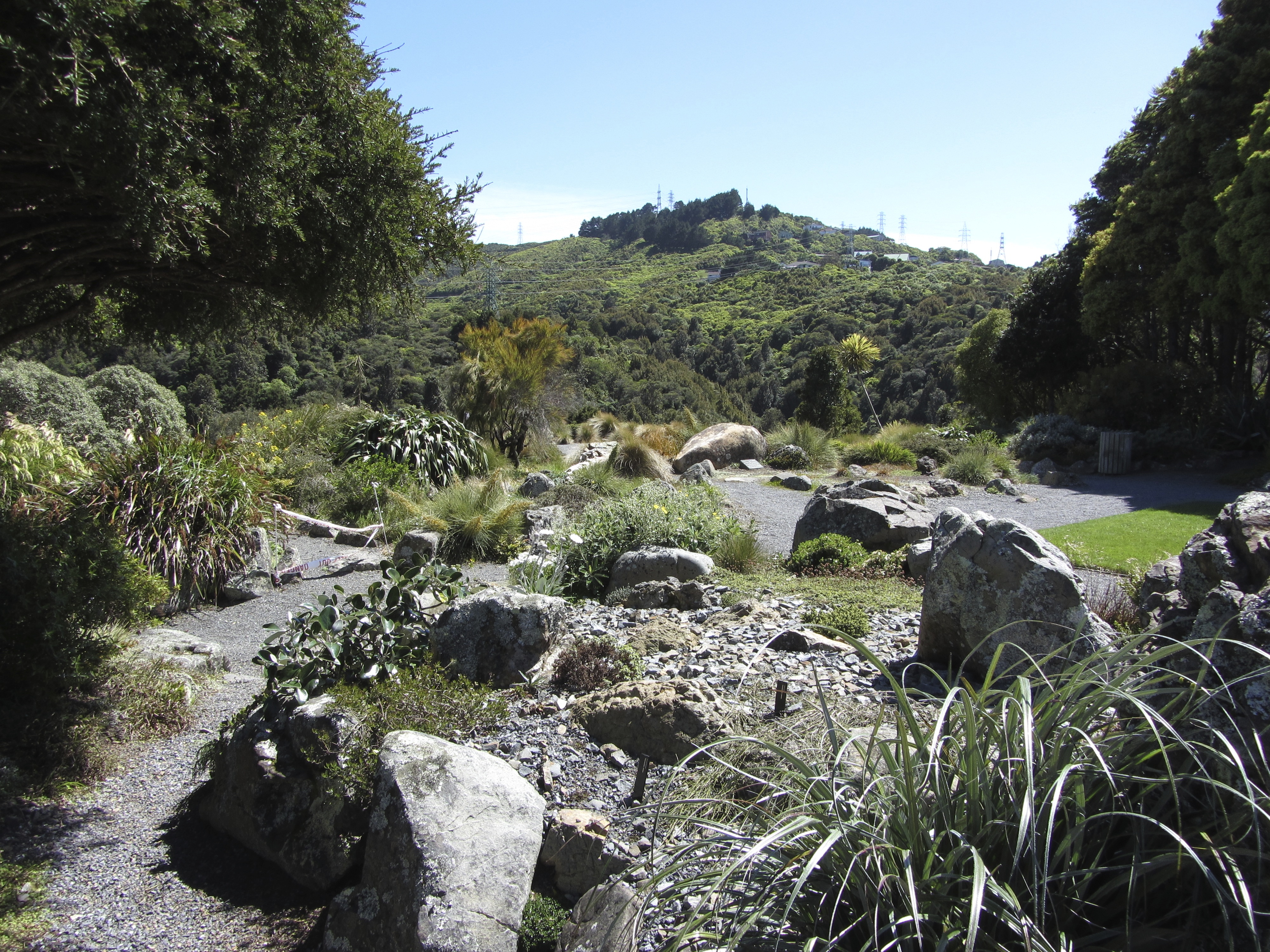
View towards Leonard Cockayne memorial - at Ōtari-Wilton's Bush

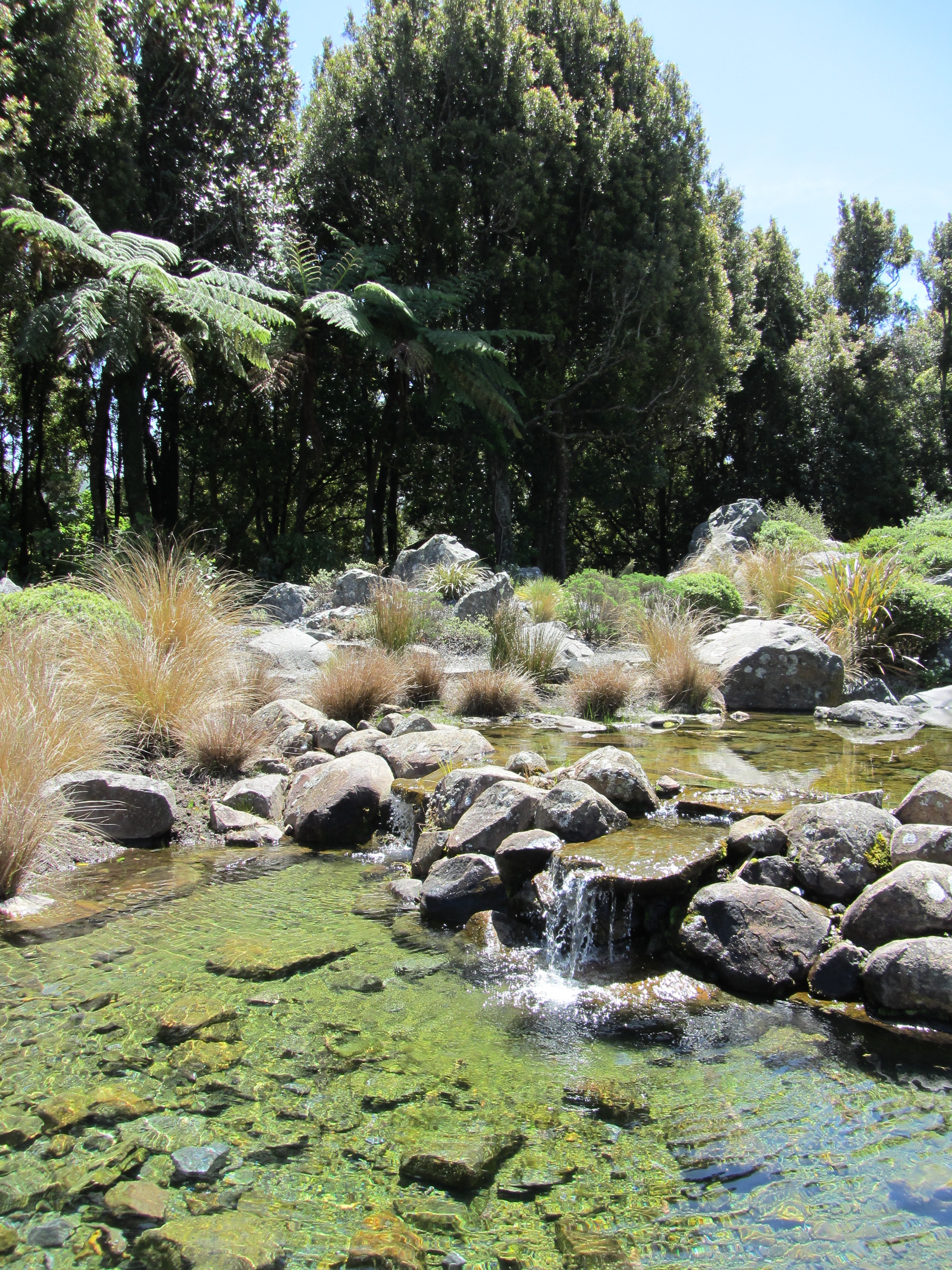
Alpine rock garden and tarn at Ōtari-Wilton's Bush

Ōtari-Wilton's Bush is the only public botanic garden in New Zealand that is entirely dedicated to native plants. The collections contain about 1,200 species, including hybrids and cultivars representing plants from mainland New Zealand and off-shore islands. The plants on display have generally been raised from seeds or cuttings collected from their original environments. The four main objectives of the collection are:

- Conservation: raise seedlings of threatened species, either to be kept in the gardens for conservation purposes, or for use in plant recovery programmes in the wild.
- Research: enable scientific study of the plant collections for plant ecology, classification and economic potential.
- Education: help visitors learn about plant names and characteristics, including providing labelling.
- Recreation: enable visitors to observe New Zealand's unique flora and enjoy the Ōtari-Wilton's Bush environment and facilities.

=== Collections ===
The plants are arranged in distinct collections, including an alpine garden, a fernery, a conifer grove, a rock garden, a ponga grove, grass and sedge garden, a kowhai garden, an offshore islands garden and a Wellington coastal garden. An interactive online map of the gardens published by the Wellington City Council provides the location of each collection, and links to a list of the plants that can be found in that section of the gardens.

=== Kauri ===
The original scheme for the gardens presented by Cockayne and Mackenzie proposed to establish plant communities, including a kauri (Agathis australis) forest, as an example of plant association from the North Auckland region. The first propagation of kauri at Ōtari was during the official opening in October 1926, when two saplings were planted at the entrance. An area of land on a hill was cleared of gorse and bracken (Pteridium esculentum) to make way for further kauri plantings, but potatoes had to be planted first to clean the soil of gorse seeds. In this cleared section, plantings occurred in the 1930s forming the "Kauri Grove". This was done for two reasons: firstly it was to prove that native trees could easily be grown for timber and secondly to create a representative ecotype of North Island kauri groves. Despite farm animals and hares damaging many of the saplings and gorse encroaching on the grove, more kauri were planted in the 1950s. As of 2010, 160 kauri trees were still present but kauri seedlings in the grove were not surviving.

=== Plant conservation ===
In April 2019, a report by Statistics New Zealand on the conservation status of indigenous land species identified species classified as threatened with or at risk of extinction. For vascular plants, a total of 1,253 species were identified (representing 46 percent of known species). Habitat loss, the impact of introduced pest species and climate change have led to a major decline in New Zealand's biodiversity. Around 289 of New Zealand's plant species are classified as 'threatened' and 749 are classified as 'at risk'. There is a significant likelihood that plant species in these categories could be extinct by the end of the century.

The Native Botanic Gardens at Ōtari-Wilton's Bush include many New Zealand plants that are threatened in the wild. Some of these plants are raised and either kept at Ōtari-Wilton's Bush as a conservation measure, or returned to original habitats as part of plant conservation recovery programmes. As of 2016 Bartlett's rata (Māori: rātā moehau) was New Zealand's most threatened tree. One specimen of this tree is growing at Ōtari, and has been flowering since 2017. The flowers are bagged to prevent hybridisation and seeds are collected as part of research and conservation efforts. Another example of work at Ōtari on threatened plants is conservation of Olearia adenocarpa (the 'dry plains shrub daisy'). Conservation work at Ōtari-Wilton's Bush has also included the planting of seeds of New Zealand's only fully parasitic flowering plant, Dactylanthus taylori (Te Pua o te Rēinga) that were translocated from Pureora forest in 2020.

== Fauna ==
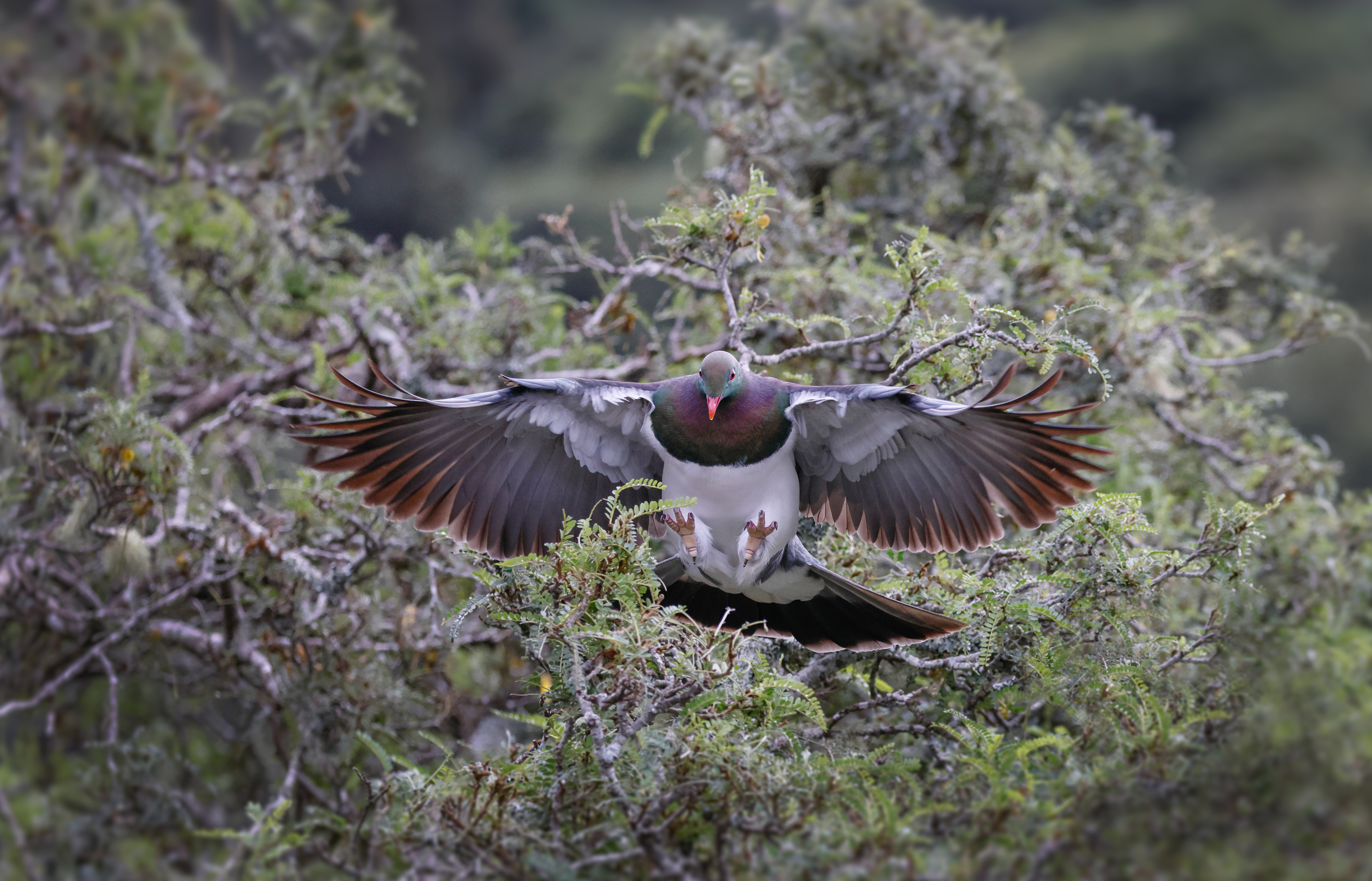
Kererū landing in kōwhai tree at Ōtari-Wilton's Bush

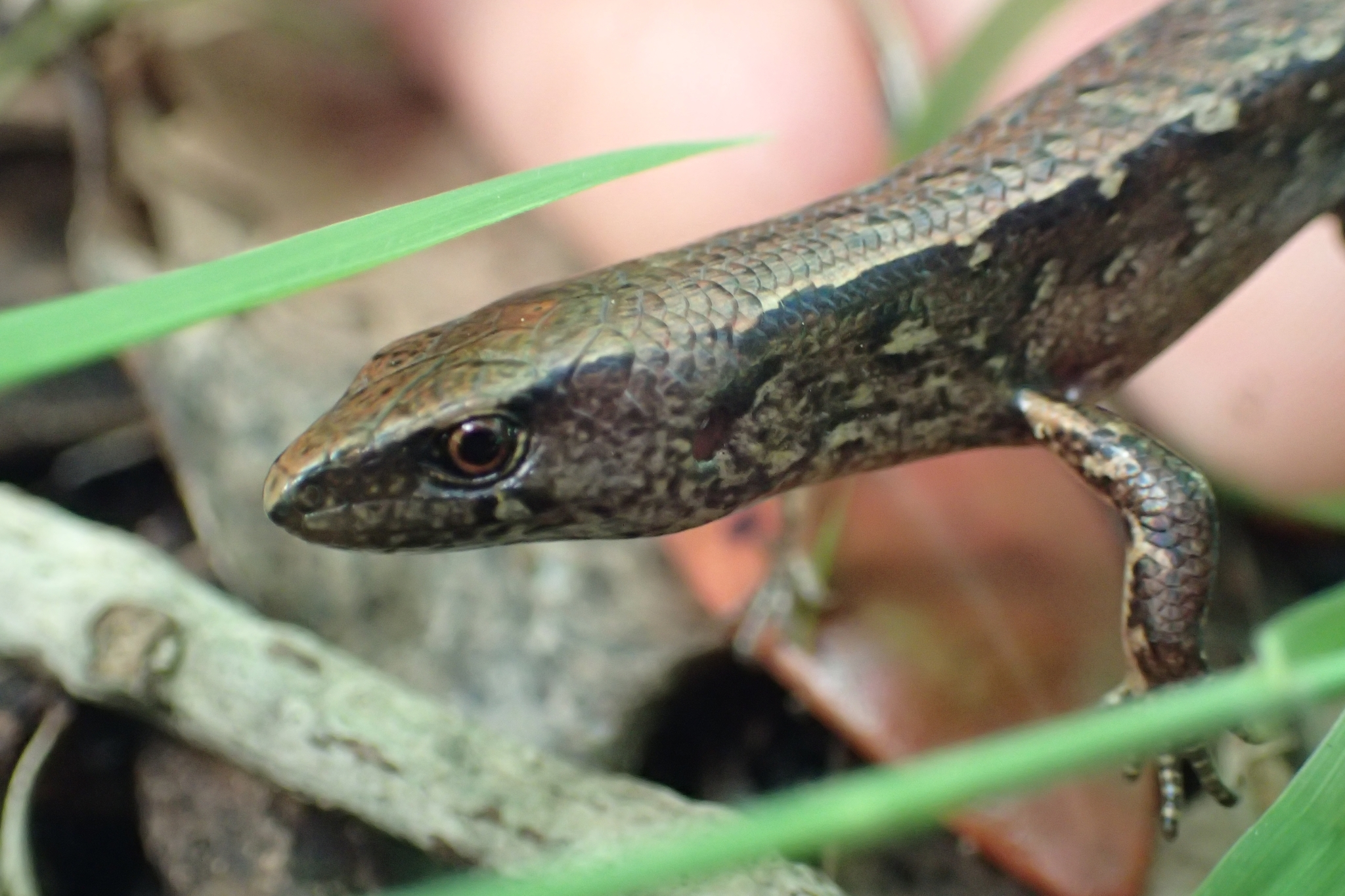
Ornate skink (Oligosoma ornatum)

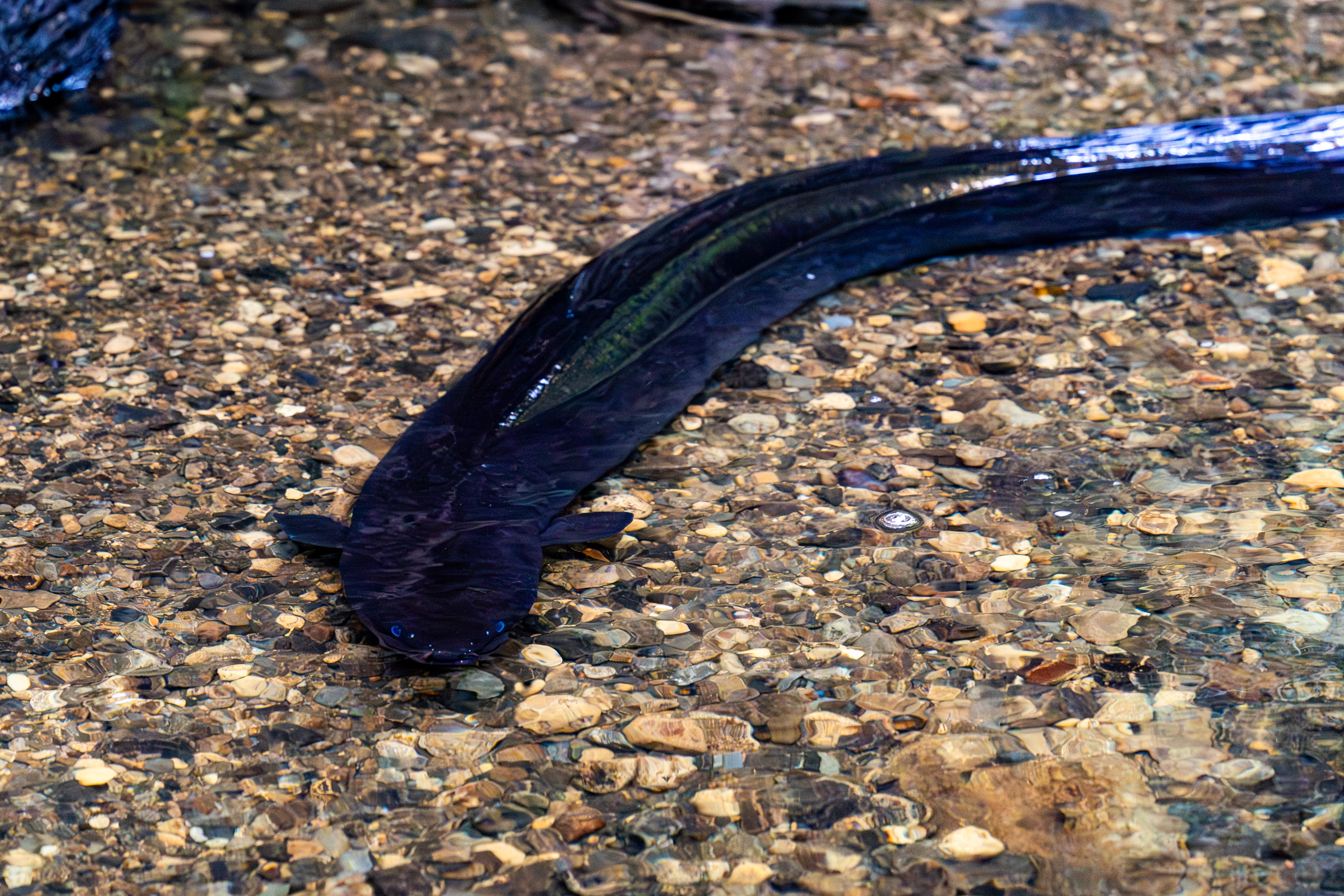
Long fin eel (Anguilla dieffenbachii) in the Kaiwharawhara Stream

A total of 24 species of birds were recorded during the bioblitz at Ōtari-Wilton's Bush in 2007. Some of these species include kererū, tūī, sacred kingfisher (Māori: kōtare), fantail (pīwakawaka), grey warbler (riroriro), silvereye (tauhou) and morepork (ruru). The numbers of birds seen has increased since predator control work began in the reserve. Over 600 species of invertebrates have been recorded from Ōtari-Wilton. Some notable invertebrates include the giraffe weevil (Lasiorhynchus barbicornis), Wellington tree wētā (Hemideina crassidens) and admiral butterflies (Vanessa). The reserve also has a population of glowworm (Arachnocampa luminosa) that can be found living in moist, vertical banks in some parts of the reserve. The tree trapdoor spider Migas otari, classified in the New Zealand Threat Classification System as data deficient, has only been recorded from Ōtari-Wilton's Bush.

The ngahere gecko Mokopirirakau 'Southern North Island' is found in the reserve. It is one of several species in the Mokopirirakau genus that is not yet formally described. The ornate skink (Oligosoma ornatum) are known to occur in the reserve. This species is considered to be at risk and is the rarest skink in Wellington City reserves. Kaiwharawhara Stream, which runs through Ōtari-Wilton, supports a range of native fish such as longfin eel (Anguilla dieffenbachii), banded kōkopu (Galaxias fasciatus), bluegill bully (Gobiomorphus hubbsi) and kōaro (Galaxias brevipinnis). A fish ladder was constructed in 2006 downstream of Ōtari-Wilton to allow fish to more easily move to and from Ōtari-Wilton, as well as other areas. The freshwater crayfish koura (Paranephrops) is also known to occur in the stream. Introduced mammal pests such as rats and mustelids are known to occur in Ōtari-Wilton, but extensive predator trapping takes place, and monitoring efforts suggest that these pest animals are only present in low numbers.

== Facilities and trails ==
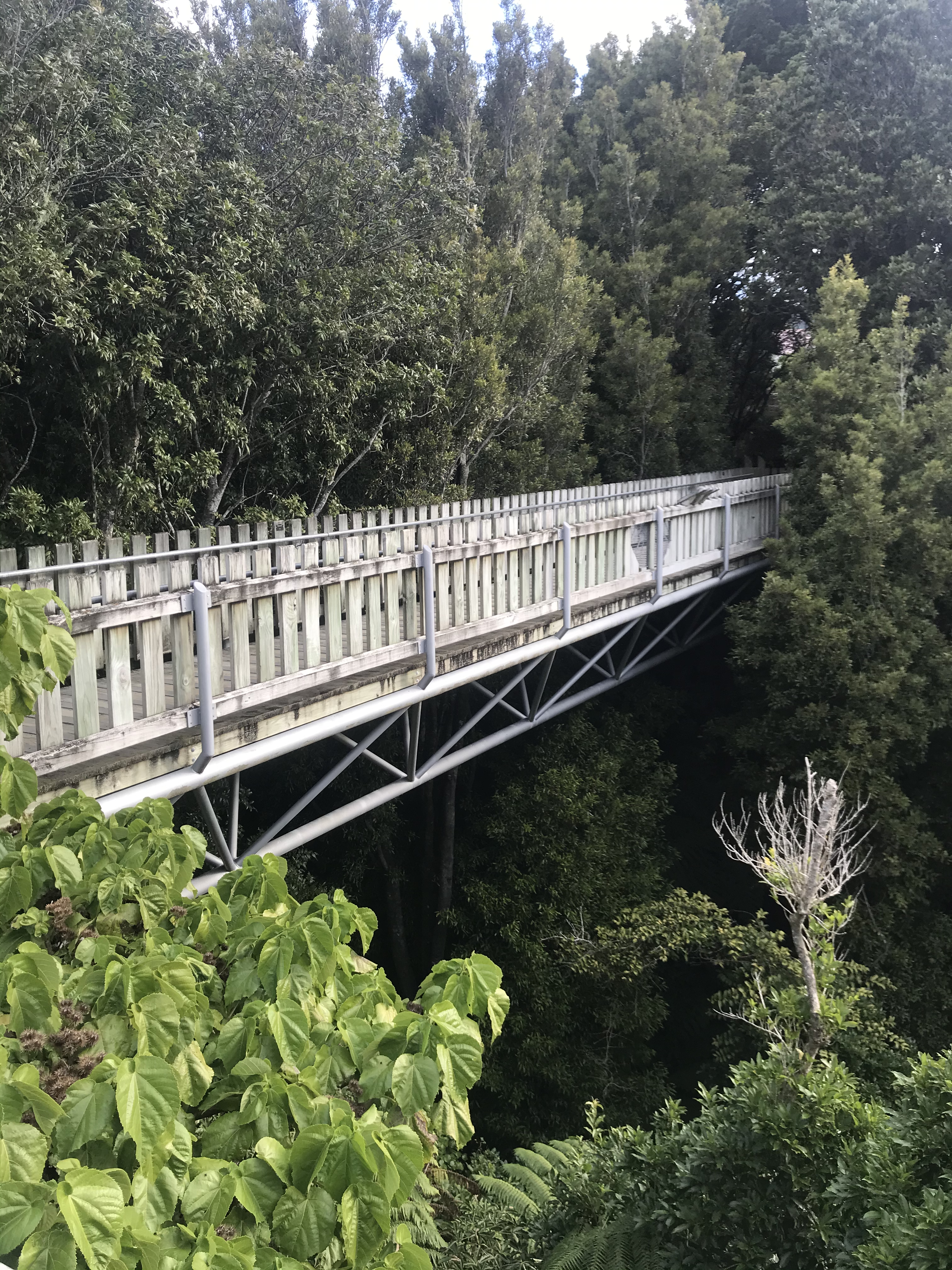
Canopy walkway

The Visitor Centre provides information about New Zealand's flora, fauna, and Ōtari-Wilton's Bush. It is open 8am–4pm daily. In December 2021, the Visitor Centre was reopened after a two month closure for renovations, and was renamed: 'Tāne Whakapiripiri', with the name meaning 'Tāne who draws people together'. There are displays and information for visiting groups, and a small lecture room that is available for educational purposes. At the entrance of Ōtari is a wooden carved gateway (waharoa), with carvings of Tāne Mahuta (to represent respect for nature), kararehe (representing insects and other animals) and ngā manu (representing birds). A 75-metre-long canopy walkway, beginning at the Visitor Centre, links the two main garden areas via a bridge. It is 18 metres above the ground and stream below.

=== Forest trails and walking tracks ===
There are walks and trails within the forest and gardens to suit a range of ages and abilities. In September 2025, Taranaki Whānui ki Te Upoko o Te Ika, who are mana whenua for Ōtari, gifted new names in te reo Māori for the walking tracks within Ōtari. Collectively, this new wayfinding experience is called Ngā ara o Ōtari, and individually the tracks are named as follows:

- Te Ara Porowhita – an easy loop through gardens, forest and Troup Picnic Lawn. Some steps and slopes, 30 to 60 minutes.
- Te Ara o Tama – a moderate walk through ancient forest, including visiting Moko the 800-year-old rimu, 90 to 120 minutes.
- Te Ara Tūpoupou – a hard, steep climb in old-growth forest, many steps, 60 to 90 minutes.
- Te Ara o Kaiwharawhara Awa – an easy, gentle, buggy-friendly walk by the stream of the same name, 60 to 90 minutes
- Te Ara Koukouoro Nature Trail – a short, moderate walk with some steps through gardens and forest, which can be self-guided using a pamphlet, 15 to 45 minutes.

=== Leonard Cockayne memorial ===
Leonard Cockayne died on 8 July 1934 in Wellington, and is buried along with his wife Maude at the north end of the Cockayne Lawn. A lookout adjacent to the memorial provides views across Ōtari-Wilton's Bush. The Leonard Cockayne Centre, formerly the curator's house, is a seminar and function room located to the south of the memorial lawn.

== Location and access ==
The gardens are located at 160 Wilton Road, approximately 5 km from the city centre. Public transport to the gardens is available via the No 14 Wilton bus route from the city centre. There are also car parks at the Wilton Road and Churchill Drive entrances. There is a path suitable for wheelchairs from Wilton Road to the Visitor Centre, and from there to the Cockayne Lookout via the Canopy Walkway. There is also an accessible path along the Kaiwharawhara Stream from the carpark off Churchill Drive to the Troup Picnic Lawn. The gardens are open 24 hours and entry is free. The visitor centre is open daily.

== Research ==
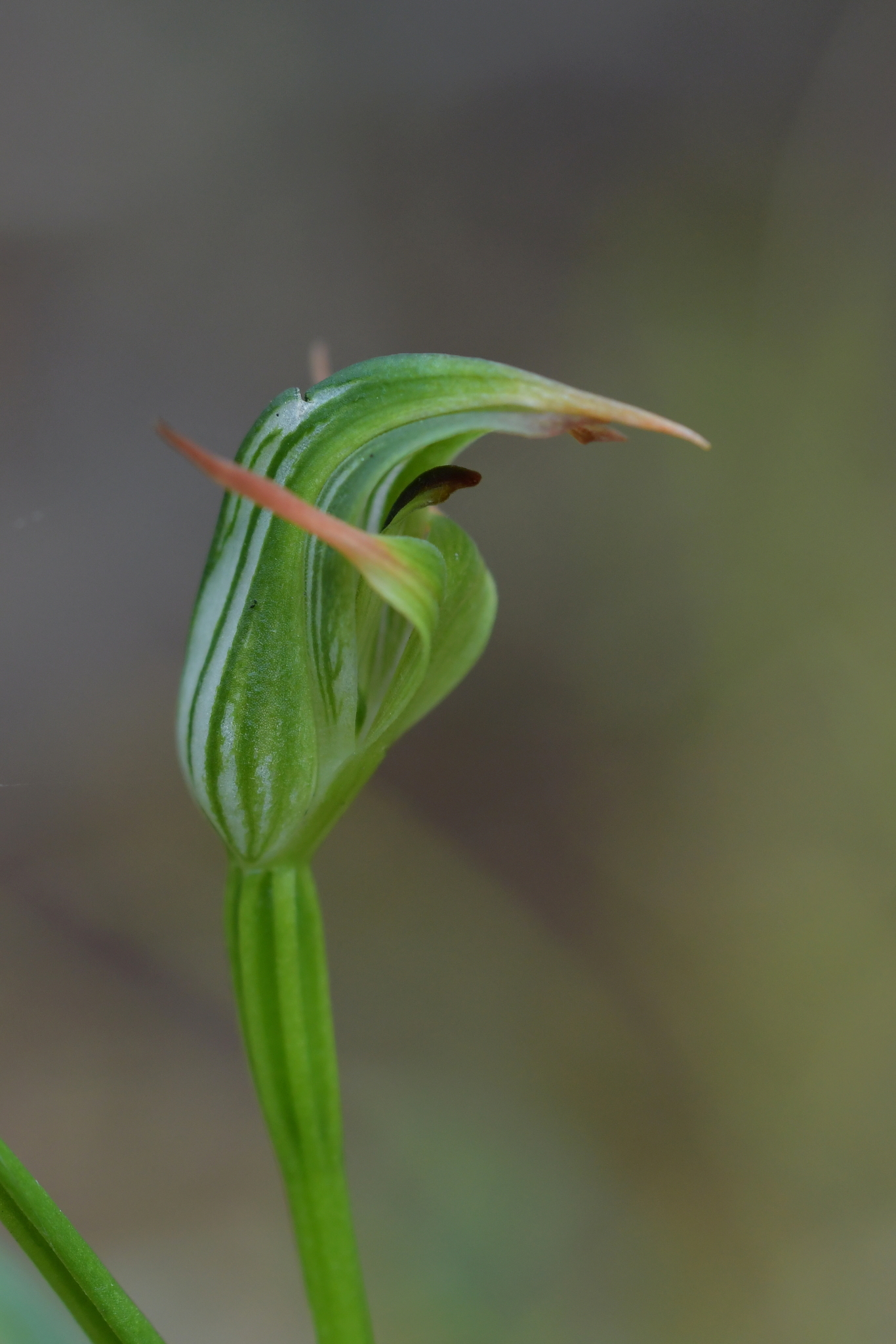
Flower of Pterostylis montana, one of the orchids propagated at Ōtari-Wilton's Bush

A number of scientific research studies have been conducted within Ōtari-Wilton's Bush regarding biodiversity. These include multi-year ecological studies on epiphyte diversity and distribution, masting in the kohekohe tree, and changes in tree abundance over time. In 2018, after receiving $72,000 of funding from the Lions Club of Karori, the Lions Ōtari Plant Conservation Laboratory was opened, with a research focus on seed germination, long-term storage of seeds, and cryopreservation of seeds of native New Zealand plants, especially in the myrtle family and orchids. The Ōtari laboratory has participated in several research projects studying the relationship between multiple threatened New Zealand orchids and their mycorrhizal fungal partners.

Research in the laboratory has included work to understand the nutrients and mycorrhizal fungal partners needed to germinate seeds of the onion orchids Microtis oligantha and M. unifolia. In that study and others, a closely-related non-threatened species (such as M. unifolia) is studied as a proxy to learn or perfect techniques that can be used on the threatened species (such as M. oligantha). In another study, researchers propagated individuals of the greenhood species Pterostylis montana and P. paludosa in the lab using in vitro plant tissue culture (also called asymbiotic germination) as a pathway to restore threatened populations with the resulting seedlings. Work in the lab has also included identifying the mycorrhizal fungal hyphae of spider orchids in the genus Corybas (including the threatened swamp helmet orchid Corybas carsei) by culturing their fungi in the lab and later sequencing their DNA.

In 2022, Ōtari-Wilton's Bush received a grant for developing propagation methods for restoration and ex situ conservation of New Zealand orchids. In 2025, seedlings of Cooper's black potato orchid (Gastrodia cooperae) that were reared in the Ōtari lab were planted in the wild population at the type locality for that species.

== Recognition and awards ==
Ōtari-Wilton's Bush is classified by the New Zealand Gardens Trust as a 6–Star rated Garden of International Significance. It is also one of the Founding Gardens of the Trust. Ōtari-Wilton's Bush has also received an international Green Flag Award that recognises and rewards well-managed parks and green spaces around the world.

== Ōtari-Wilton's Bush Trust ==
The Ōtari-Wilton's Bush Trust was formed as a registered charitable trust in 2001. The trust deed registered with the application describes the principal purpose of the trust as: "To educate the local and wider community in New Zealand flora, thereby fostering public awareness and appreciation of native plants and of the environmental importance of their protection, conservation and rehabilitation and promoting the unique botanic diversity of Ōtari-Wilton's Bush". The trust is a member of the New Zealand Plant Conservation Network. One of the founding trustees was the renowned New Zealand botanist John Dawson.

Although Ōtari-Wilton's Bush is owned and managed by the Wellington City Council, the Ōtari-Wilton's Bush Trust has a significant role in supporting the objectives of the gardens, via education programmes, marketing initiatives and arranging volunteers. Work undertaken by the volunteers includes predator control, garden maintenance, weeding, replanting, and acting as hosts for visitors, including hosting organised tours of the gardens.

== See also ==
- Leonard Cockayne
- New Zealand Plant Conservation Network
- Botanic Gardens Conservation International
