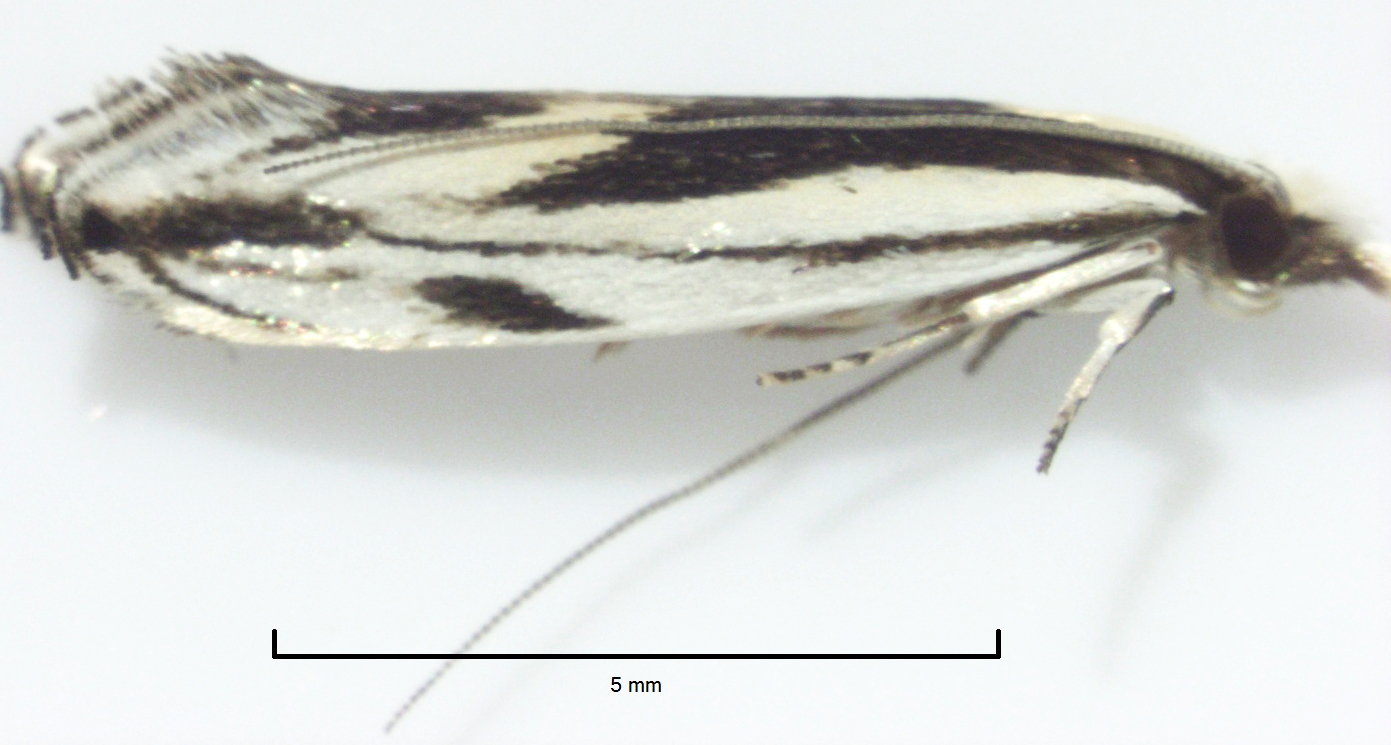

Scientific classification
- Kingdom: Animalia
- Phylum: Arthropoda
- Clade: Pancrustacea
- Class: Insecta
- Order: Lepidoptera
- Family: Tineidae
- Genus: Erechthias
- Species: E. chasmatias

Binomial name
- Erechthias chasmatias Meyrick, 1880

Synonyms
- Hectacma chasmatias (Meyrick, 1880)

= Erechthias chasmatias =

Species of moth endemic to New Zealand

Erechthias chasmatias is a species of moth in the family Tineidae. It was first described by Edward Meyrick in 1880. This species is endemic to New Zealand and is found in the North Island. This species inhabits native bush. Adults are on the wing from October to April and have been collected by beating small trees and foliage.

== Taxonomy ==
It was first described by Edward Meyrick in 1880 using two male specimens taken in forest at the Wellington Botanic Garden in January and named Erechthias chasmatias. In 1915 Meyrick placed this species in the genus Hectacma. In 1927 Philpott studied and illustrated the male genitalia of this species. George Hudson discussed and illustrated this species in his 1928 book The butterflies and moths of New Zealand under that name. In 1988 John S. Dugdale synonymised Hectacma with the genus Erechthias and thus this species returned to the name Erechthias chasmatias. The male lectotype is held at the Natural History Museum, London.

== Description ==
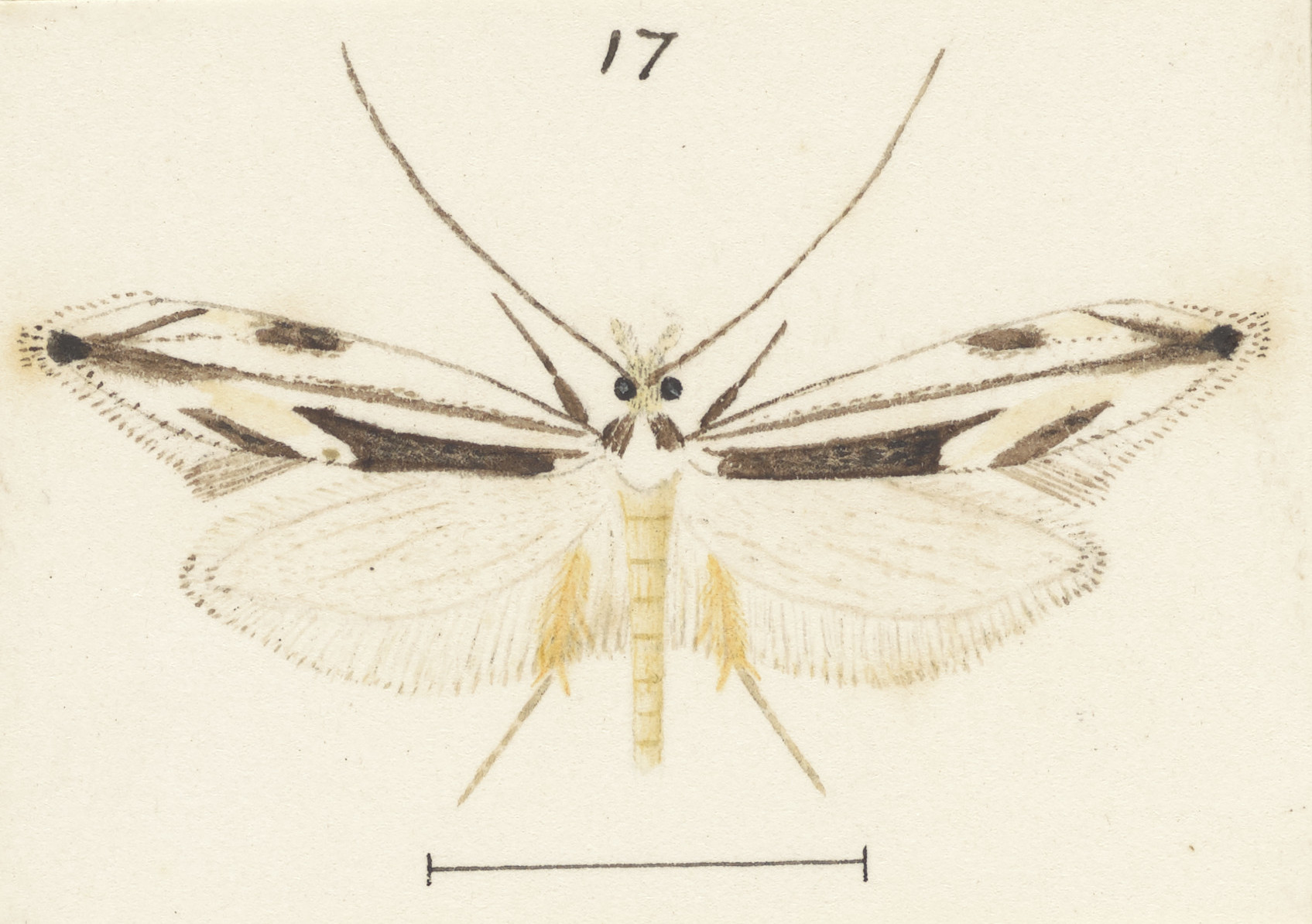
Illustration by Hudson.

Meyrick described this species as follows:

♂. 6 1/2" Head white. Palpi white, second joint of labial palpi dark fuscous above, beneath with loose scales, terminal joint loosely haired. Antennae whitish, obsoletely annulated with darker. Thorax white, lateral and anterior margins dark fuscous. Abdomen ochreous-whitish. Legs whitish, anterior tibiae and tarsi blackish above, middle tarsi with dark fuscous rings at base of joints. Fore-wings white, with dark fuscous markings; a broad streak along inner margin from base to beyond middle, where it is attenuated and bent upwards, ending on disc beyond middle; a slender straight line from base of costa through disc to apex, interrupted at 3/4, beyond which it becomes much broader, containing a black longitudinal streak and ending in a round black apical spot; a short very oblique blotch on costa beyond middle; a black streak along costa from about 3/4 to apex; an elongate streak on Kind-margin about anal angle, attenuated at both ends; cilia white, with two blackish dividing lines throughout, and indications of a projecting hook at apex. Hind-wings whitish-grey, cilia whitish, with two dark fuscous cloudy lines round apex.

== Distribution ==
This species is endemic to New Zealand. This species has been observed in the North Island. It is relatively common in Wellington having been observed in both the Wellington Botanic Garden and a Ōtari-Wilton's Bush.

== Habitat and hosts ==
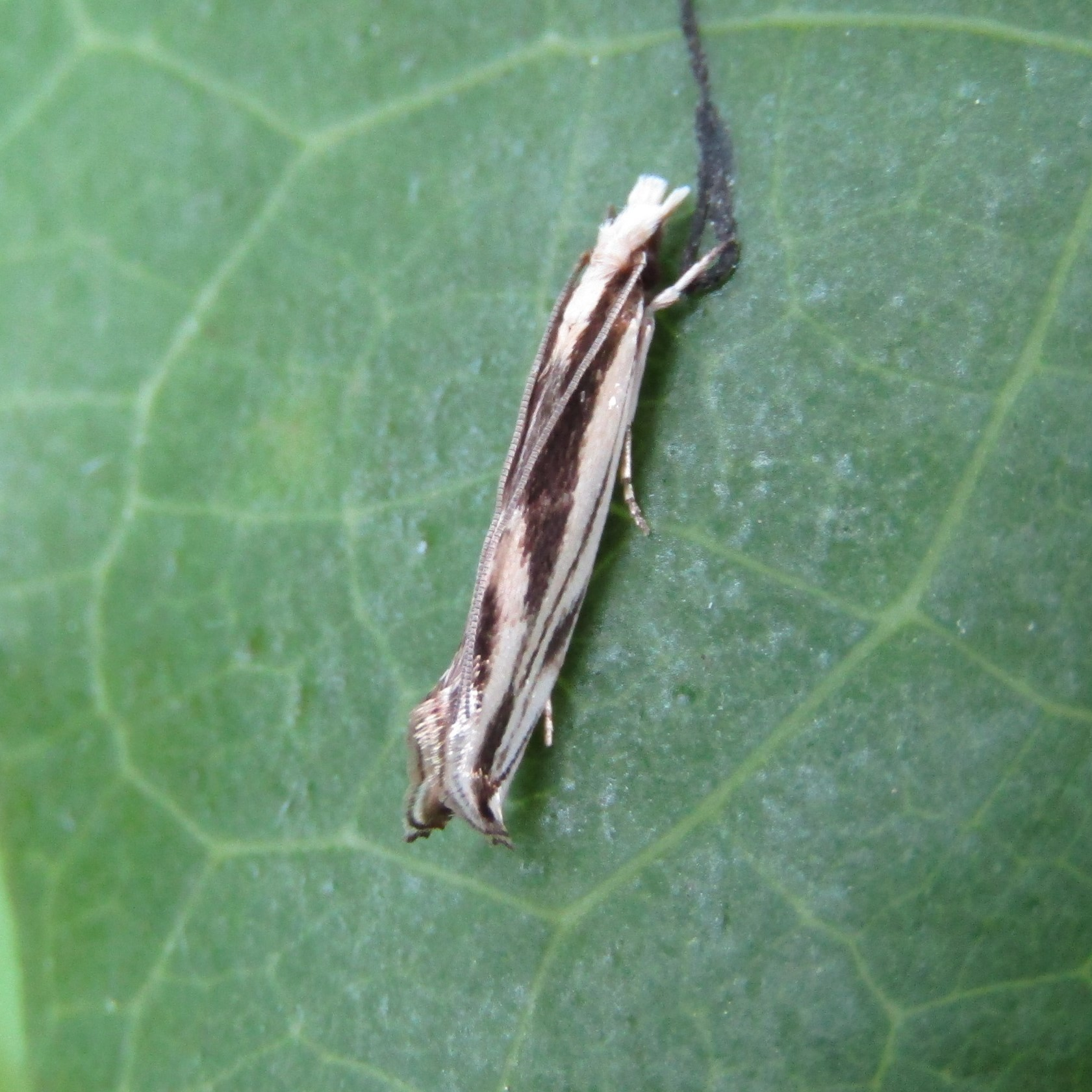
E. chasmatias at rest in native forest.

This species inhabits native forest. Larvae of species in the genus Erechthias feed on dead plant debris or the tough leaves of plants such as palms.

== Behaviour ==
The adults of this species are on the wing from October to April but are most commonly observed in November to January. They have been collected by beating the trunks of small trees.
