= Whangamarino Wetland =

Wetland of international importance under the Ramsar Convention

- Whangamarino Wetland looking at vegetation from the Reao Stream
- Interactive map of Whangamarino Wetland
- Location: Waikato District, New Zealand
- Coordinates: 37.359788°S 175.162239°E
- Area: 5,923 hectares (14,640 acres)

Ramsar Wetland
- Official name: Whangamarino
- Designated: 4 December 1989
- Reference no.: 443

The Whangamarino Wetland in the Waikato District is the second largest wetland complex of the North Island of New Zealand. Encompassing a total area of more than 7200 hectares, the Department of Conservation manages 5,923 hectares of peat bog, swamp, mesotrophic lags, open water and river systems listed as a wetland of international importance under the Ramsar Convention. Fish and Game New Zealand are the second largest landowner, managing 748 hectares of the wetland primarily as gamebird hunting habitat.

The site is also one of three of New Zealand’s foremost wetlands included in the Arawai Kākāriki wetland restoration programme, which aims to “enhance the ecological restoration of three of New Zealand’s foremost wetland/freshwater sites, making use of strong community involvement and promoting research into wetland restoration techniques”.

== Ecosystems and biodiversity ==
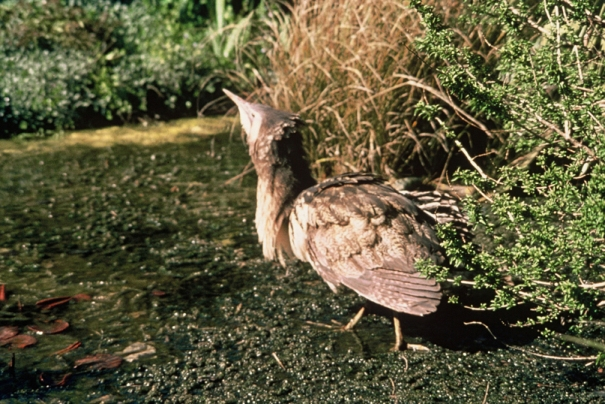
Australasian bittern/matuku (Botaurus poiciloptilus)

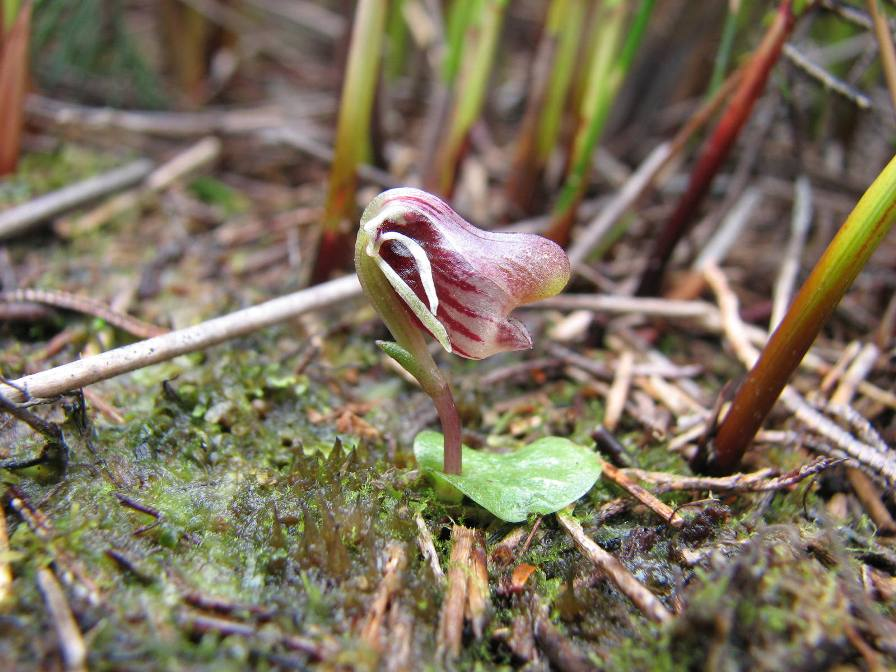
The tiny, critically endangered swamp helmet orchid (Corybas carsei)

Whangamarino Wetland consists of a rich and representative variety of wetland ecosystems (peat bog, swamp, mesotrophic lags, open water and river systems); one of the features that lent support to its designation under the Ramsar Convention. 239 species of wetland plants are found in the Whangamarino, 60 percent of which are indigenous. A number of these are uncommon or extremely rare, including the water milfoil Myriophyllum robustum, the clubmoss Lycopodium serpentinum, and the critically endangered swamp helmet orchid Corybas carsei, now found nowhere else in the world. Baumea spp., mānuka (Leptospermum scoparium) and wire rush (Empodisma minus) are the dominant vegetation of the peat bogs, while greater species diversity is found in the mineralised swamp zones, including introduced species such as grey willow (Salix cinerea) and crack willow (Salix × fragilis). Mosses and lichens are also well represented in the wetland.

These diverse ecosystems provide habitat to a wide range of native wetland birds, including the Australasian bittern/matuku (Botaurus poiciloptilus). Approximately 20 percent of New Zealand's breeding bittern population can be found in the Whangamarino. The wetland is also an important site for a number of other rare or threatened wetland birds, including spotless crake/pūweto (Porzana tabuensis), marsh crake/koitareke (Porzana pusilla), North Island fernbird/mātātā (Bowdleria punctata vealeae), and New Zealand dabchick/weweia (Poliocephalus rufopectus). Occasionally the Whangamarino is visited by other unusual birds such as royal spoonbill/kōtuku-ngutupapa (Platalea regia) and Japanese snipe (Gallinago hardwickii), which helps keeps amateur ornithologists interested in the site.

The wetland provides habitat for a diverse range of native freshwater fish, including a significant population of the threatened black mudfish/waikaka (Neochanna diversus). It is also home to longfin and shortfin eel/tuna and other galaxiid species. Introduced invasive fish species are also present in Whangamarino Wetland; koi carp (Cyprinus carpio) and brown bullhead catfish (Ameiurus nebulosus) are a particular problem as their aggressive feeding behaviour stirs up bottom sediments, affecting bank stabilisation and aquatic plant life. A study of koi carp otoliths undertaken by University of Waikato MSc student Jennifer Blair found that Lake Waikare and the Pungarehu Stream appear to be a source of recruits, with koi carp moving from these areas into the Waikato River and Lake Waahi.

== Hydrology ==
Hydrology is a driving component of wetlands, with many plants and animals uniquely adapted to the seasonal wet/dry cycle. Whangamarino Wetland is fed by a catchment area of approximately 48,900 hectares. During the 1960s the hydrology of the Whangamarino was significantly impacted by the implementation of the Lower Waikato-Waipa Flood Control Scheme managed by Waikato Regional Council, and has also been impacted by the extraction of sand and hydro-power generation on the Waikato River.

The flood control scheme is intended to replicate the natural water storage function of Lake Waikare and Whangamarino Wetland in a highly manipulated and more controlled way. To do this, the direction of the Te Onetea Stream was reversed to transport water from the Waikato River into Lake Waikare during high river flows, while the level of Lake Waikare was lowered by one metre. The lake is kept to a strict fluctuation regime of approximately 0.3 metres and flood gates control the movement of water into the Whangamarino Wetland via the artificial Pungarehu Canal. Water is then stored in the Whangamarino until it is released back into the Waikato River via flood gates on the Whangamarino River.

In 1994 the construction of a rock rubble weir on the Whangamarino River was commissioned by the Department of Conservation and the Auckland/Waikato Fish and Game Council. The weir maintains minimum summer water levels in approximately 1,400 hectares of the mineralised wetland and helps recreate a seasonal hydrological cycle.

The single-track North Island Main Trunk railway line crosses the wetland, and it has been proposed that two million tonnes of spoil from the Auckland City Rail Link could be used to double-track the busy section of line which is a bottleneck on the section between Auckland (Papakura) and Hamilton.

== Ecosystem services ==
Whangamarino Wetland looking west from Falls Road in 1991

Sometimes known as 'nature's benefits’, ecosystem services are the benefits (usually to humans) provided by natural ecosystems. They include provisions such as clean drinking water, supporting processes like the decomposition of wastes, and cultural benefits such as spiritual or recreational opportunities.

Wetlands provide an astonishing array of ecosystem services for the local community. These include mitigating the effects of flood and drought, replenishing groundwater, helping filter sediment and nutrients and purify water, providing reservoirs of biodiversity and wetland resources, providing for cultural values, recreation and tourism, and climate change mitigation and adaptation. The Lower Waikato-Waipa Flood Protection Scheme has been estimated to save the Waikato Region $5.2 million (in 2007 dollars) by limiting damage to surrounding farmland during times of peak flood events.
Farmers are a particular benefactor of wetland ecosystem services. On good quality wetland margins, damp soils and dense pockets of native rushes and sedges are effective in:

- Converting nitrogen from surface runoff and leaching to nitrogen gas which is returned to the atmosphere (denitrification);
- Trapping sediments that flow over land, helping to prevent infilling and sedimentation;
- Filtering and trapping effluent particles;
- Trapping bacteria and other harmful micro-organisms, which then are killed by exposure to sunlight or are retained by the soil;
- Retaining water by maintaining the ground water table and soil moisture levels;
- Protecting land from flood damage by absorbing and slowly releasing water during high rainfall, overland or river flows.

== Recreation ==
Whangamarino is a popular duck hunting location and recreational fishers targeting koi carp, rudd, catfish, goldfish, eel and mullet are regularly seen in the wetland. Bow hunting for koi carp is increasing in popularity, while bird watching and kayaking are also commonly undertaken activities. 748 hectares of the wetland is owned by the Auckland/Waikato Fish and Game Council and thousands of gamebirds frequent the wetland annually, attracting hunters from Auckland and the greater Waikato area. The Fish and Game Council and gamebird hunters are working together with the Department of Conservation to improve wetland habitat and control predators around popular hunting sites.

== Threats ==
A report by the New Zealand Department of Conservation (DOC), released in February 2026, says the wetland has got worse since it became a Ramsar site in 1989. The report names four main causes:

- Poor water quality. In 2022–23, floods washed contaminants and a lot of organic matter into the wetland. This caused very low oxygen levels and an outbreak of botulism, and many fish and birds died.
- Changes to water levels. The natural flow of water in the wetland has been changed by people.
- Fire. A fire started by people in October 2024 caused more damage.
- Invasive species. Koi carp are one of the main invasive species named in the report. DOC is also working to stop the spread of the pest plants willow, golden dodder and royal fern.

The report found that native wetland habitat, the number of Australasian bitterns (matuku), and the cultural values of mana whenua have all declined. The wetland is a taonga (treasure) for Waikato Tainui.

== Conservation ==
Waikato Regional Council is leading an action plan for the wetland and nearby Lake Waikare. DOC, Waikato Tainui, the Waikato River Authority, Fish and Game and landowners are helping. The plan will look at water flow, land use, water quality, wildlife and cultural values together.

== Cultural importance ==
Whangamarino is located within the rohe (area) of the Waikato-Tainui iwi (tribe) and is considered a taonga (treasure) by local hapū. Early Māori utilised the wetland as a source of eel/tuna and birds for food, and flax/harakeke (Phormium tenax) for traditional cultural purposes. The rivers of the wetland were used for travel and recreation and the peat margins were used to preserve taonga such as waka, tools and weapons. Dense vegetation inhibited further use of the wetland, although it was used as a sanctuary during times of war.

The Waikato War of 1863–1864 saw several major battles take place in the Whangamarino area, including the fierce land battle at Rangiriri. A small remnant of Rangiriri pā remains today; further north visitors can walk up a short track to Te Teoteo's pā and the Whangamarino Redoubt at the confluence of the Whangamarino and Waikato Rivers. Here, visitors can stand at the site where two forty-pound Armstrong guns fired on Māori entrenchments at Meremere pā and also obtain a good scenic view looking south over the northern part of the wetland.

== Conservation management ==
Whangamarino Wetland has been subject to intensive biodiversity management, research, and community awareness campaigns by the Department of Conservation as part of the Arawai Kākāriki wetland restoration programme. Conservation measures taken to maintain or improve biodiversity include controlling weeds, particularly grey willow, aquatic grasses, yellow flag iris, alligator weed and gorse, and mammalian pests, including mustelids, rodents, cats and possum. The Whangamarino weir was repaired in 2010 and is now operating as it should to help maintain minimum summer water levels in the wetland. Fencing to exclude stock from wetland areas and restoration plantings have also taken place. Monitoring of Australasian bittern/matuku and other cryptic wetland birds including spotless crake/pūweto, marsh crake/koitareke, and fernbird/mātātā is regularly carried out, as is monitoring of black mudfish/waikaka and threatened plants such as Anzybas carseii and Lycopodium serpentinum. The Auckland/Waikato Fish and Game Council have also implemented a number of projects to enhance wetland habitat in the Whangamarino for gamebirds. Research carried out to date includes studies on sediment sources and accumulation rates, ecohydrology and peat oscillation, water quality, vegetation monitoring and monitoring of mammalian predators.

== See also ==
- Wetlands of New Zealand
