= John Gretton Mackenzie =

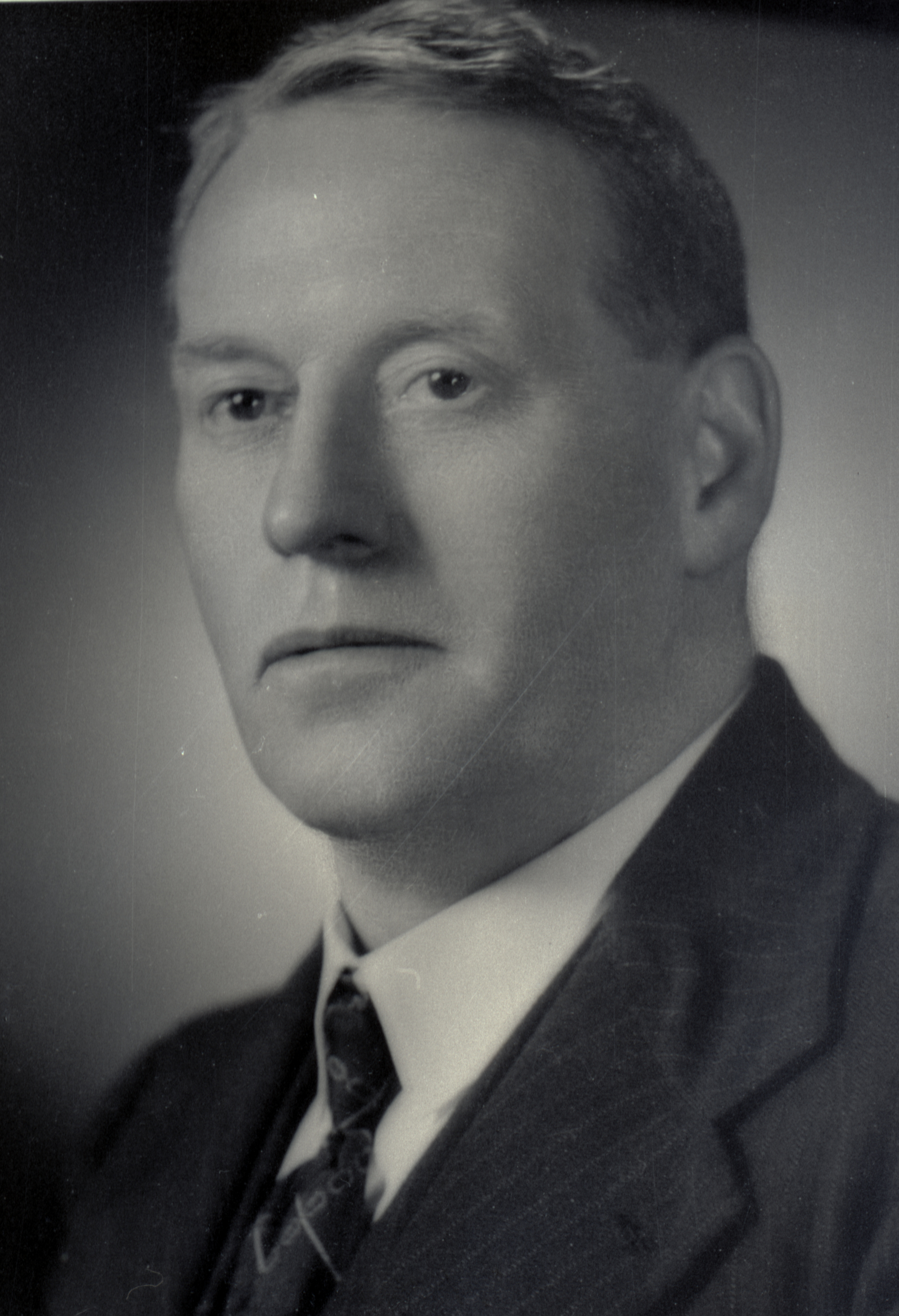
- Mackenzie in about 1940
- Born: 1881; Otago, New Zealand
- Died: 10 March 1953 (aged 71–72)
- Occupations: Gardener; conservationist
- Years active: 1906-1947
- Known for: Development of municipal gardens
- Notable work: Otari-Wilton's Bush; Wellington Botanic Garden

John Gretton Mackenzie (or MacKenzie) (Note: Sources use both spellings. His birth was registered as Mackenzie. Mackenzie himself appears to have used both variants at different times.) (1881–1953) was a director of the Wellington City Council Parks and Reserves Department, serving from 1918 to 1947. He was instrumental in the creation of Ōtari Native Botanic Garden.

== Early life ==
Mackenzie was born in Otago in 1881 to Scottish immigrants John Mackenzie and Fanny (née Gretton). He studied botany and Latin in Dunedin. As a young man he took part in rowing, yachting and football, and was a member of the Dunedin Highland Rifles.

Mackenzie worked for nurserymen Howden and Moncrief in Dunedin for four years, then worked for two years at the Lower Hutt nursery of H C Gibbons and Company, which at the time was said to be the largest nursery in New Zealand. He was then asked to work at Gibbons' nursery in Gisborne, and from Gisborne moved to Oamaru in 1906.

== Oamaru ==
In December 1905 Mackenzie was appointed as curator of the public gardens at Oamaru, a position he held for almost 13 years. He specialised in native plants and while at Oamaru established one of New Zealand's best collections of native ferns. He also laid out gardens at Waitaki Boys' School and King George's Park, planted Bushy Beach Reserve, and oversaw tree planting by the Oamaru Beautifying Society. At his official farewell from Oamaru in 1918, Mackenzie stated that "he had always endeavoured to avoid hampering citizens with any display of red tape in the discharge of his duties".

== Wellington ==
Mackenzie was appointed as the first Director of Parks and Reserves in Wellington in September 1918, a position that came with a salary of £400 and a free house at the Botanic Garden. He was also in charge of all baths and beaches. A Reserves Committee already existed, but the Council wanted better organisation. The chairman of the Reserves Committee noted:

The Reserves Committee is the only administrative committee outside the council proper, and it is granted a turn of £10,000 per annum for its operations. Mr. Mackenzie's duty will be to advise the committee, bring down a comprehensive policy for the future, at the same time keeping a sharp eye on economy, as the cost of maintaining all the reserves, etc., is a big drain on the revenue. There has in the past been a certain measure of divided control, and this has proved to be not beneficial. So Mr. Mackenzie is to have solo control and to act to the Reserves Committee in the same capacity as does the City Engineer (Mr. W. H. Morton) to the council. [...] The committee recognises that Mr. Mackenzie's position is such that it is second only to that of the City Engineer, especially insofar as the future development of Wellington city is concerned from a beautifying point of view. [...] The policy Mr. Mackenzie will pursue will be to make a thorough inspection of all the reserves, gardens, etc., under the control of the committee, and bring down a report. He will then advise the committee on the policy to be adopted in regard to planting, re-layouts, etc., and make provision for sufficient material in the nurseries. Any reorganisation which Mr. Mackenzie deems to be advisable will be given effect to.

On commencing work, Mackenzie found that there were no records kept about work done in Wellington's reserves. A careful organiser, he set up stock and plant books and issued timesheets to his workers.

Mackenzie had a strong interest in New Zealand trees and plants and used them throughout the city, on occasion having to argue for their inclusion in planting schemes. Regarding cabbage trees for Kent Terrace, he said they were an archetypal New Zealand tree, hardy and ornamental. Asked if there was another city in New Zealand that grew cabbage trees, he replied "There is no other town in the same position". He especially liked pōhutukawa and planted them all over the city at Pigeon Park (now Te Aro Park), the Carillon and Dominion Museum, in front of the Railway Station and along the centre islands between Kent and Cambridge Terraces. These efforts gained him the nickname "Pohutukawa Jack" or "Pohutukawa Mac".

Mackenzie replanted the Town Belt which had been denuded by farming. For example, 50,000 trees including 5000 pōhutukawa were planted on Mount Victoria during 1923. Mount Victoria was fully planted by 1932 and the Tinakori Hills by 1940. Some of this work was carried out by workers on the Government's employment relief scheme. Trees were also planted in Wellington by children and adults with the Wellington Beautifying Society, for which Mackenzie served as president for a time. In 1941 Mackenzie reported that during his time over one million trees had been planted on the Town Belt. He had begun with Pinus radiata and macrocarpa as earlier staff had done, because they kept down gorse which would not grow under the shade of pine trees, then progressed to native plants and ornamental exotic trees. He thinned out existing pines and stopped planting them at all in the mid-1930s as his native plantings became established.

=== Wellington Botanic Garden ===
Mackenzie oversaw significant change at the Botanic Garden. He remodelled the main garden by creating seasonal bedding displays and planting magnolia trees, installed the Founders Gates and put up new fencing along Glenmore Street. Mackenzie was criticised for cutting down pine trees in the gardens, but this made way for a variety of attractive native plants. During Mackenzie's tenure major earthworks were undertaken, including the extension of Anderson Park in 1931–34. A ridge was demolished and the Waipiro Stream was piped so that a gully could be filled in. Later, Magpie Lawn was created by filling in Glenmore Gully. Mackenzie introduced 'Tulip Sunday' at the gardens. Tulip Sunday was held near the end of September each year from 1944 until 2023.

=== Ōtari-Wilton's Bush ===
One of Mackenzie's major achievements was the establishment of the Ōtari Native Botanic Garden. Ōtari, part of Ōtari-Wilton's Bush reserve, is New Zealand's only public botanic garden dedicated solely to native plants. In 1906 the government bought 54.5 hectares (135 acres) of land in the Ōtari Native Reserve from its Māori owners and designated it as a scenic reserve, known as Wilton's Bush. In January 1918, the land was transferred to Wellington City Council for “recreation purposes and for the preservation of native flora”.

On his commencement as Director of Parks and Reserves in October that year, Mackenzie immediately put a stop to sheep and cattle grazing in the reserve, noting that grazing removes undergrowth and allows wind to pass through the forest. He recommended that three acres at the top of the hill be cleared, fenced and developed as a picnic ground, and a resident caretaker be appointed to prevent fires and vandalism and maintain paths. Outside the picnic area, the land was to be cleared of gorse and planted in native trees. Mackenzie also arranged construction of bridges and fences in the reserve.

Mackenzie was a keen supporter of a proposal put forward at a meeting of the New Zealand Institute of Horticulture in March 1926 to create a native plant museum. He and Leonard Cockayne, honorary botanist to the institute, prepared a scheme for the development of an open-air native plant museum at Ōtari, which was accepted by the Reserves Committee. Cockayne's report stated:

The object of this scheme is to present a vivid picture of the plant-life of New Zealand—so different from that of any other country—and the species of which it is composed, together with the use of such for the adornment of gardens. If carried out [...] there would be in the city of Wellington an open-air museum the like of which has never been attempted before, not only in this country but in any part of the world. [...] Each species would be accurately labelled with its name, its habitat, and its distribution in New Zealand. There would also be grown the various hybrids and varieties of the species. Thus the whole flora of New Zealand could be seen at a glance, as it were, and the plants could be admired and studied in detail.

== Personal life ==
As well as working in public gardens, Mackenzie wrote articles and gave lectures on horticultural subjects and was a judge at various horticultural shows.

Mackenzie married Jane (Jeannie) Carr in 1906 and they had nine children. All of Mackenzie's five sons and one of his daughters served in World War 2, with two dying on active service.

The eldest, John Gretton Carr Mackenzie, studied horticulture in Dunedin and at Kew Gardens and became Director of Parks and Reserves in Hastings in 1935. He enlisted in 1940 and served as a gunner with the New Zealand Artillery. When Frimley Park in Hastings was opened in 1953, Mackenzie was praised for "creating a most attractive and restful park".

Andrew, formerly of the Evening Post in Wellington, had gone to England to pursue a career in journalism, but joined the Artists' Rifles in London on the outbreak of war and was later a mortar specialist with the Somerset Light Infantry.

Angus, an accountant at Wanganui, held a pilot's licence and went into the Air Force. He died on a night raid to Essen in June 1942.

Dugald had passed exams for the New Zealand Institute of Horticulture and left New Zealand in December 1938 to study for two years at Kew Gardens but in 1939 joined the New Zealand contingent in London. He served with the New Zealand anti-tank corps in Egypt. In 1946 Dugald was appointed as Director of Parks and Reserves at Palmerston North, holding the position until 1966. The Dugald Mackenzie Rose Garden at the Victoria Esplanade Gardens in Palmertston North is named after him.

Mackenzie's youngest son Donald Carr Mackenzie was on the staff of the New Zealand Insurance Office at Wellington but left to train for a commission in the Royal New Zealand Air Force. He became a Squadron-Leader in the Royal Air Force but died on active service in 1943. He was awarded a Distinguished Flying Cross.

Annie Carr Mackenzie served in the Pacific as a typist with the Women's Auxiliary Army Corps and the Second New Zealand Expeditionary Force.

Mackenzie and his wife retired to Otaki, where he became president of the Otaki Horticultural Society. Mackenzie died in October 1953.
