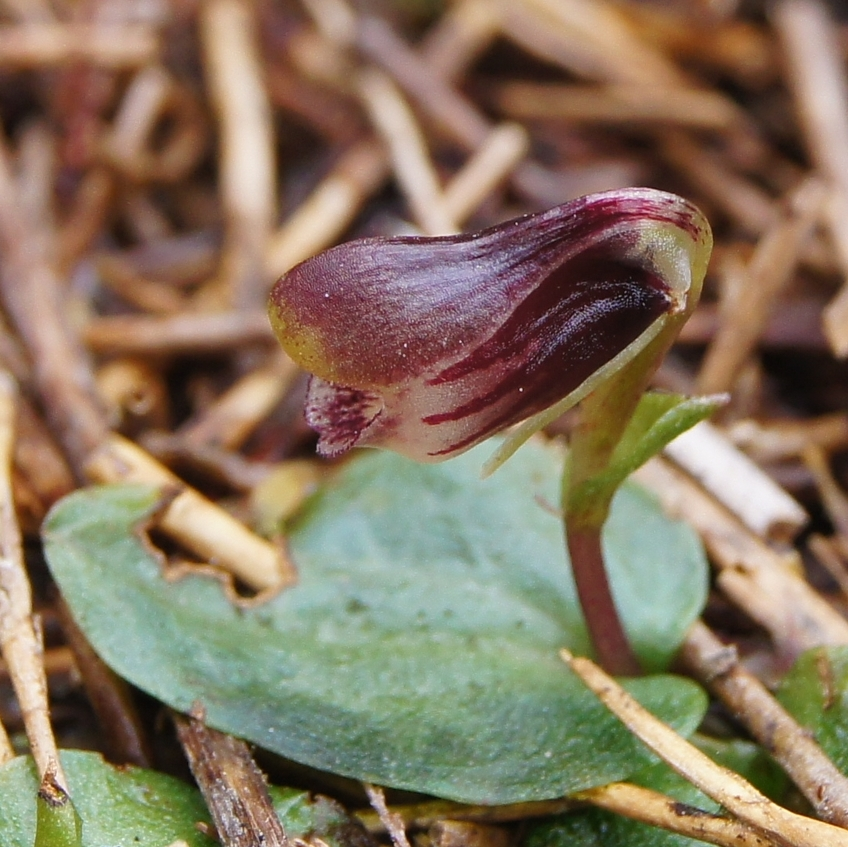

Conservation status
- Nationally Critical (NZ TCS)

Scientific classification
- Kingdom: Plantae
- Clade: Tracheophytes
- Clade: Angiosperms
- Clade: Monocots
- Order: Asparagales
- Family: Orchidaceae
- Subfamily: Orchidoideae
- Tribe: Diurideae
- Genus: Corybas
- Species: C. carsei

Binomial name
- Corybas carsei (Cheesman) Hatch

Synonyms
- Corysanthes carsei Cheesman; Corysanthes matthewsii Cheesman; Corybas matthewsii (Cheeseman) Schltr.; Anzybas carsei (Cheesman) D.L.Jones & M.A.Clem.

= Corybas carsei =

Species of orchid endemic to New Zealand

Corybas carsei, commonly known as the swamp helmet orchid, is a species of terrestrial orchid endemic to the North Island of New Zealand. It is found only in Whangamarino Wetland in the Waikato District, where the population of fewer than 250 plants and is assessed as "Critically Endangered".

== Description ==
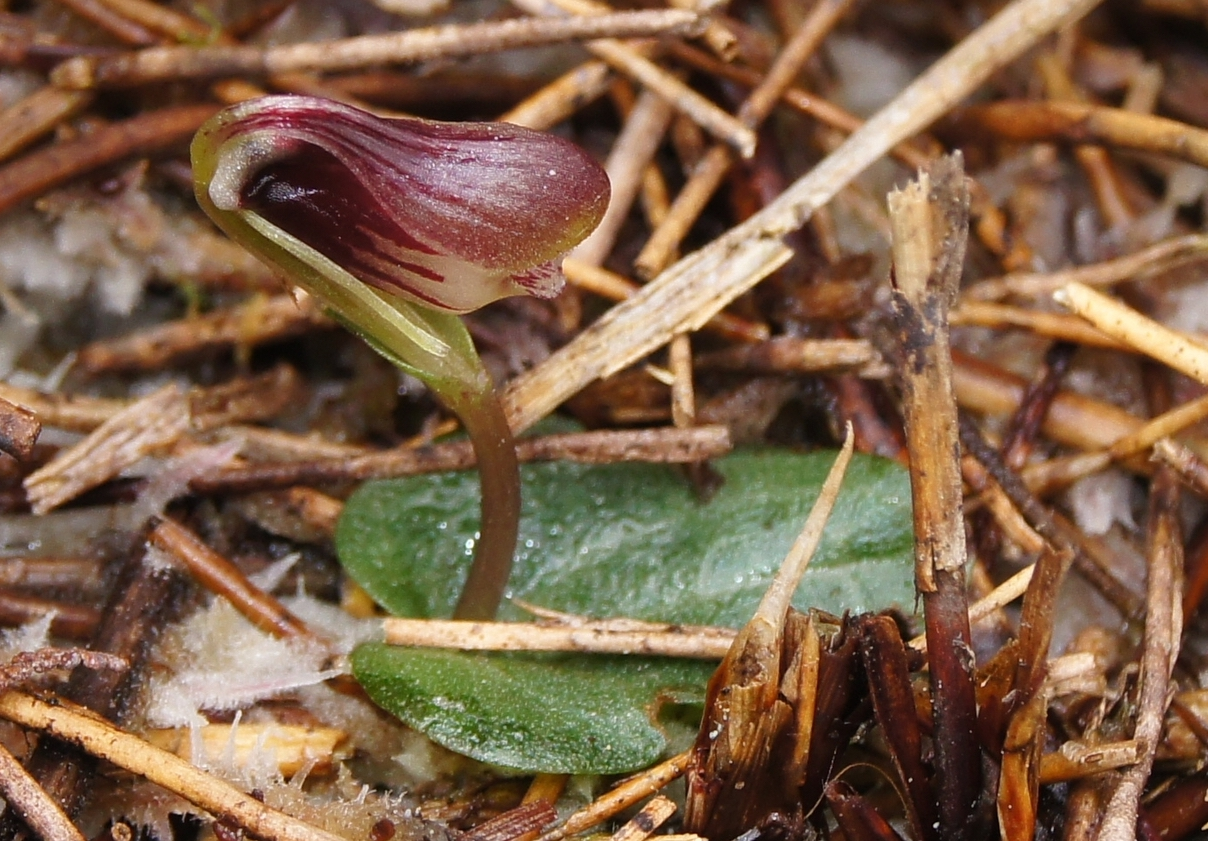
Corybas carsei growing in Whangamarino Wetland, New Zealand

This small orchid grows from a single leaf 10–25 mm long, and flowers in September to November. Its single flower stands only 1– 3 cm tall, and has a hooded appearance as the maroon uppermost sepal hides most of the petals. Its petals are white with a maroon base and 8–10 pink/maroon stripes. Its seed capsule is 5–6 cm tall, and contains dust-like seeds dispersed by the wind. Like other orchids, the seeds have no food reserves and need a symbiotic fungus to provide the energy to germinate.

== Taxonomy ==
Corybas carsei was first described by Thomas Cheeseman in 1912, and named Corysanthes carsei after schoolteacher Harry Carse who, with Blen Matthews, collected the type specimen from swamps near Lake Tangonge, Kaitaia. It was moved to the genus Corybas (a senior synonym) in 1945. A 2002 revision of Corybas split it into numerous genera and placed this species in the genus Anzybas, but this is not widely accepted.

== Distribution and habitat ==
The swamp helmet orchid prefers open, disturbed wetlands and grows best amongst liverworts and mosses. It is only known from the Whangamarino Wetland. It is similar to the Australian species C. fordhamii and more research is needed to confirm that the two species are separate.

== Conservation ==
Corybas carsei is listed as "threatened - nationally critical" by the New Zealand Government Department of Conservation. The main threat to C. carsei is modification of wetlands, both from draining for agriculture and increased nutrients from pastoral farming. Nutrients allow the invasion of other plant species that can swamp the orchid in dense vegetation. This species was once found as far north as Kaitaia and south to Moanatuatua Swamp in the Waikato, but by the mid-20th century was presumed extinct. It was rediscovered in the early 1980s in Whangamarino Wetland, near Te Kauwhata, during a survey to counter proposals to drain the wetland. Whangamarino once underwent regular fires sparked by land clearance and steam trains, but after active fire suppression began in the 1960s its vegetation changed from the mosaic of open mossy sites favoured by the orchids to tall sedges and grasses, and by 1991 the wild population of C. carsei had dropped to only 30 individuals.

To rescue the species, the Department of Conservation (DOC) began in 1994 to mimic natural disturbance by setting fires in fenced plots, in winter when the ground was damp so the underlying peat did not ignite. The aim was to simulate fires caused by lightning strikes and more recently by human activity. After fire, C. carsei reappears at higher densities and flowers and sets seed more heavily. Without a fire regime, only a few of the orchids flower each year, so a winter burn every seven years is now part of its management plan.

Corybas carsei is so vulnerable that New Zealand Geographic were only allowed to photograph plants on condition they did not reveal their exact location. The DOC conservation status of the species is "Nationally Critical" because of its small fluctuating population size (less than 250 individuals), single tiny home range, and dependence on continued conservation management. Its numbers have gradually increased, from 77 plants in 2008 to 195 in 2011.
