= Corybas fordhamii =

Banded helmet orchid

Scientific classification
- Kingdom: Plantae
- Clade: Tracheophytes
- Clade: Angiosperms
- Clade: Monocots
- Order: Asparagales
- Family: Orchidaceae
- Subfamily: Orchidoideae
- Tribe: Diurideae
- Genus: Corybas
- Species: C. fordhamii

Binomial name
- Corybas fordhamii (Herman Rupp) Rupp

Synonyms
- Anzybas fordhamii (Rupp) D.L.Jones & M.A.Clem.; Corysanthes fordhamii Rupp

Species of orchid

Corybas fordhamii, commonly known as banded helmet orchid or swamp helmet orchid, is a species of terrestrial orchid endemic to south-eastern Australia. It has an egg-shaped to heart-shaped leaf and a reddish to reddish purple flower which leans forward. It is similar to C. unguiculatis which does not grow in swamps and has a different labellum.

== Description ==
Corybas fordhamii is a terrestrial, perennial, deciduous, herb with a single egg-shaped to heart-shaped leaf 22–38 mm (0.9–1 in) long and 17–30 mm (0.7–1 in) wide. The leaf is green on the upper surface and bluish green on the lower side. There is a single reddish to reddish purple flower 12–14 mm (0.5–0.6 in) long which leans forward on a stalk 12–14 mm (0.47–0.55 in) long. The dorsal sepal is spoon-shaped, 11–13 mm (0.43–0.51 in) long and 4.5–6 mm (0.18–0.24 in) wide. The lateral sepals are narrow triangular, white and about 7 mm (0.3 in) long. The petals are similar to the lateral sepals but only half as long. The labellum is about 14 mm (0.6 in) long, slightly shorter than the dorsal sepal and has red and white streaks. It has many short red bristles around its edge. Flowering occurs from July to October.

== Taxonomy ==
Banded helmet orchid was first formally described in 1941 by Herman Rupp who gave it the name Corysanthes fordhamii and published the description in The Victorian Naturalist. The type specimen was collected at Brunswick Heads. In 1942 Rupp changed the name to Corybas fordhamii. The specific epithet (fimbriatus) honours "Mr. F. [Fred] Fordham, of Brunswick Heads on the North Coast of N.S.W. who has done much valuable work in collecting and bringing into notice orchids of the Brunswick River district".

== Distribution and habitat ==
Corybas fordhamii grows in dense, shrubby heath and swamps, often with Melaleuca squarrosa and is not often collected. It occurs along the coast of New South Wales, Victoria and south-eastern South Australia and on Flinders Island. It was formerly found at Burleigh Heads in Queensland but is now extinct there.

== Conservation ==
This helmet orchid is listed as "endangered" under the Tasmanian Threatened Species Protection Act 1995. The main threats to the species are clearing of habitat, inappropriate fire regimes, soil erosion and weed invasion.
