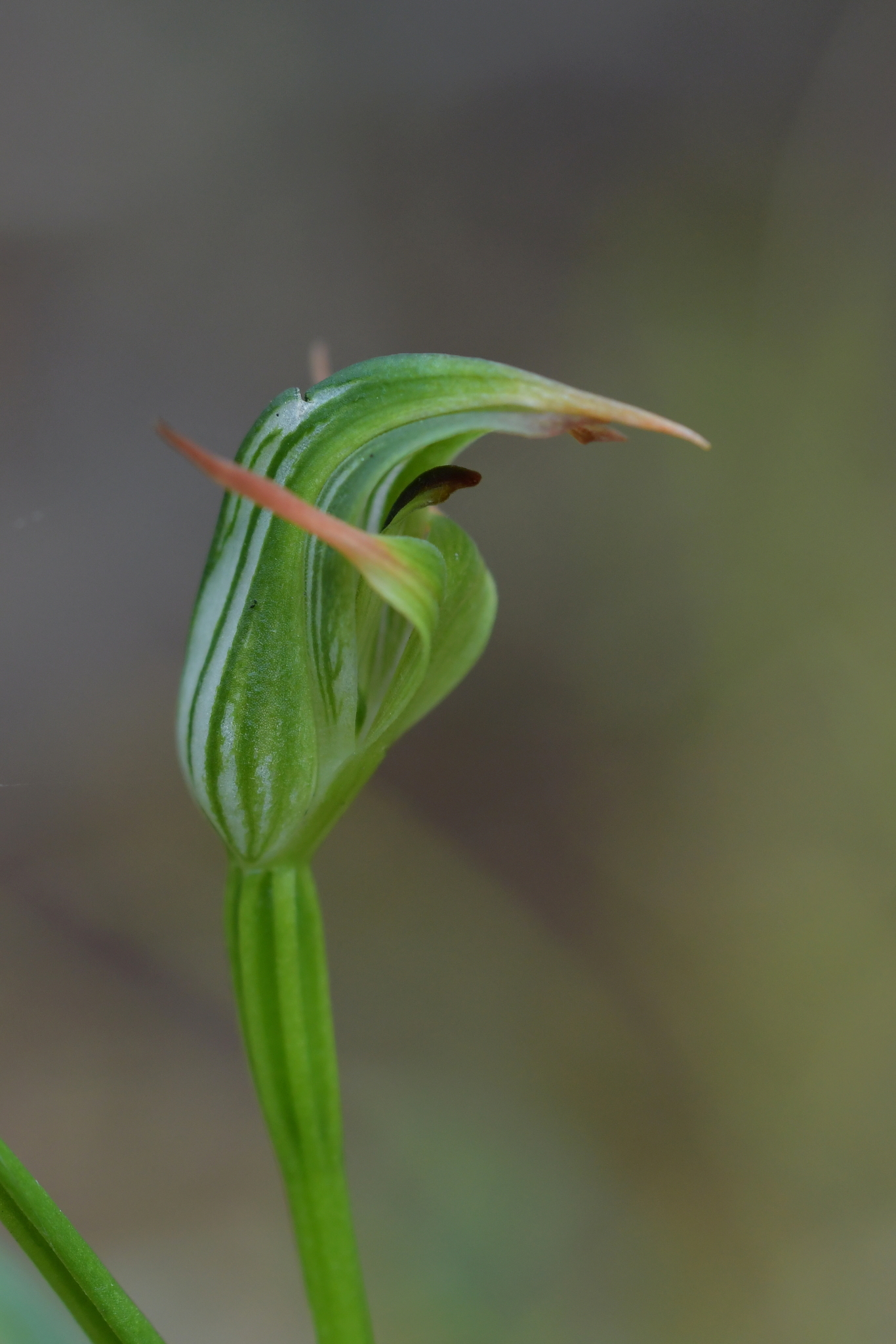

Scientific classification
- Kingdom: Plantae
- Clade: Tracheophytes
- Clade: Angiosperms
- Clade: Monocots
- Order: Asparagales
- Family: Orchidaceae
- Subfamily: Orchidoideae
- Tribe: Cranichideae
- Genus: Pterostylis
- Species: P. montana

Binomial name
- Pterostylis montana Hatch

Synonyms
- Pterostylis furcata var. linearis Hatch

= Pterostylis montana =

Greenhood

Species of orchid

Pterostylis montana is a species of greenhood orchid endemic to New Zealand. Flowering plants have erect, linear leaves on the flowering stem with a single green flower with translucent white stripes and an unusual twisted labellum.

== Description ==
Pterostylis montana is a terrestrial, perennial, deciduous, herb with an underground tuber, and often grows in small colonies. Flowering plants have a single green flower with translucent white stripes on a flowering stem 30–350 mm (1–10 in) tall with up to six stem leaves which are strongly keeled. The stem leaves are linear to lance-shaped increasing in size up to stem to the largest which are 140–180 mm (6–7 in) long and about 10 mm (0.4 in) wide. The dorsal sepal and petals are fused, forming a hood or "galea" over the column. The dorsal sepal is 18–30 mm (0.7–1 in) tall, erect near its base but suddenly curves forward with a short tip slightly longer than the petals. The lateral sepals are more or less erect, spread apart from each other with short, narrow tips projecting slightly above the galea with a broad V-shaped sinus between them and a wide gap between them and the galea. The labellum is reddish-green, darker near its tip, flattened with a central ridge and its tip is twisted to one side. Flowering occurs from September to December.

== Taxonomy and naming ==
Pterostylis montana was first formally described in 1949 by Edwin Hatch and the description was published in Transactions and Proceedings of the Royal Society of New Zealand. The specific epithet (montana) is a Latin word meaning "of mountains", referring to the habitat of this species.

== Distribution and habitat ==
This greenhood grows in a wide range of habitats from dense forests to peat bogs on the North, South and Chatham Islands.

== Conservation ==
Pterostylis montana is classed as "not threatened".
