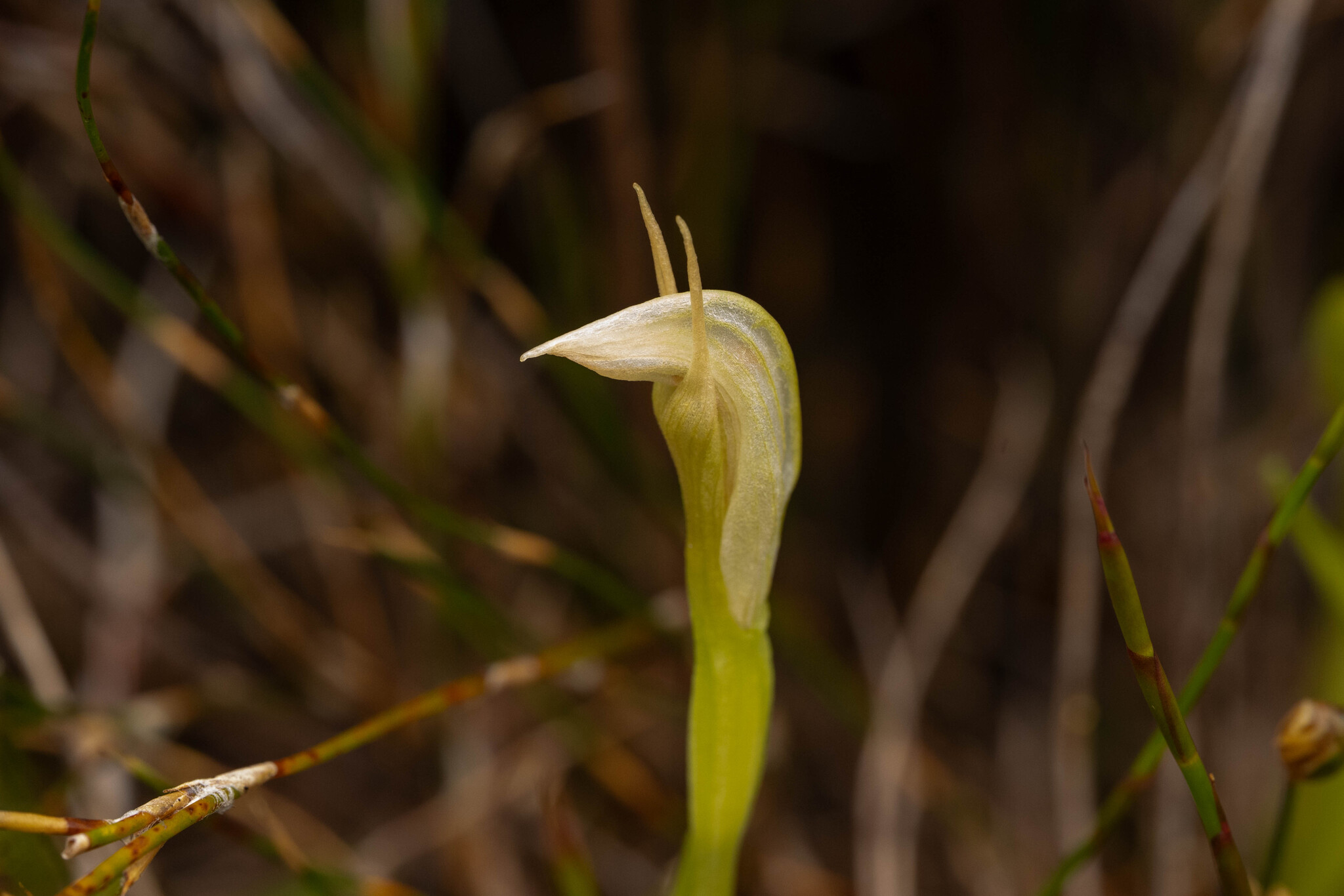
- Observed on the West Coast

Scientific classification
- Kingdom: Plantae
- Clade: Embryophytes
- Clade: Tracheophytes
- Clade: Spermatophytes
- Clade: Angiosperms
- Clade: Monocots
- Order: Asparagales
- Family: Orchidaceae
- Subfamily: Orchidoideae
- Tribe: Cranichideae
- Genus: Pterostylis
- Species: P. paludosa

Binomial name
- Pterostylis paludosa D.L.Jones, Molloy & M.A.Clem.

Synonyms
- Pterostylis furcata var. linearis Hatch

= Pterostylis paludosa =

Swamp greenhood

Species of plant

Pterostylis paludosa, commonly known as swamp greenhood, is a species of greenhood orchid endemic to New Zealand. As with similar orchids, plants in flower differ from those that are not. Those not in flower have a rosette of leaves on a short stalk but plants in flower lack a rosette and have a single flower with leaves on the flowering spike. This greenhood has a translucent white flower with pale to yellowish-green stripes.

== Description ==
Pterostylis paludosa is a terrestrial, perennial, deciduous, herb with an underground tuber. When not in flower, plants have a stalked rosette of two to four, linear to lance-shaped, pale to yellowish-green leaves that are 25–60 mm (1–2 in) long and 7–11 mm (0.3–0.4 in) wide. Plants in flower lack a rosette but have a single flower 18–20 mm (0.7–0.8 in) long and 5–6 mm (0.20–0.24 in) wide on a flowering stem 80–900 mm (3–40 in) tall. There are three or four linear to lance-shaped, grass-like leaves that are 24–26 mm (0.9–1 in) long and 7–11 mm (0.3–0.4 in) wide on the flowering stem. The flower is translucent white with pale to yellowish-green stripes. The dorsal sepal and petals are fused, forming a hood or "galea" over the column. The galea is inflated near its base then suddenly narrows to a pointed tip with the dorsal sepal slightly longer than the petals. The lateral sepals are erect, in close contact with the galea and taper to narrow tips 9–11 mm (0.35–0.43 in) long, only slightly higher than the galea. The sinus between the lateral sepals bulges slightly and has a small V-shaped notch in the centre. The labellum is dark green, erect near its base then suddenly curves and protrudes above the sinus. Flowering occurs from September to January.

== Taxonomy and naming ==
Pterostylis paludosa was first formally described in 1997 by David Jones, Brian Molloy and Mark Clements from a specimen collected between the Greymouth suburbs of Taylorville and Cobden. The description was published in The Orchadian. The specific epithet (paludosa) is a Latin word meaning 'marshy', 'swampy' or 'boggy'.

== Distribution and habitat ==
This swamp greenhood grows in sunny places in peat bogs and heath. It is found on the North Island between the Great Barrier Island and Waiouru. On the South Island it is mainly found on the west coast between Nelson and Westport. It also grows on Chatham Island.

== Conservation ==
Pterostylis paludosa is classed as "at risk – declining". The main threats are wetland drainage and changed fire regimes.
