= Mnesarchella ngahuru =

Scientific classification
- Kingdom: Animalia
- Phylum: Arthropoda
- Clade: Pancrustacea
- Class: Insecta
- Order: Lepidoptera
- Family: Mnesarchaeidae
- Genus: Mnesarchella
- Species: M. ngahuru

Binomial name
- Mnesarchella ngahuru Gibbs, 2019

Species of moth endemic to New Zealand

Mnesarchella ngahuru is a species of primitive moth in the family Mnesarchaeidae. This species is endemic to New Zealand and is found in the Taupō, Gisborne and Wellington regions.

== Taxonomy ==
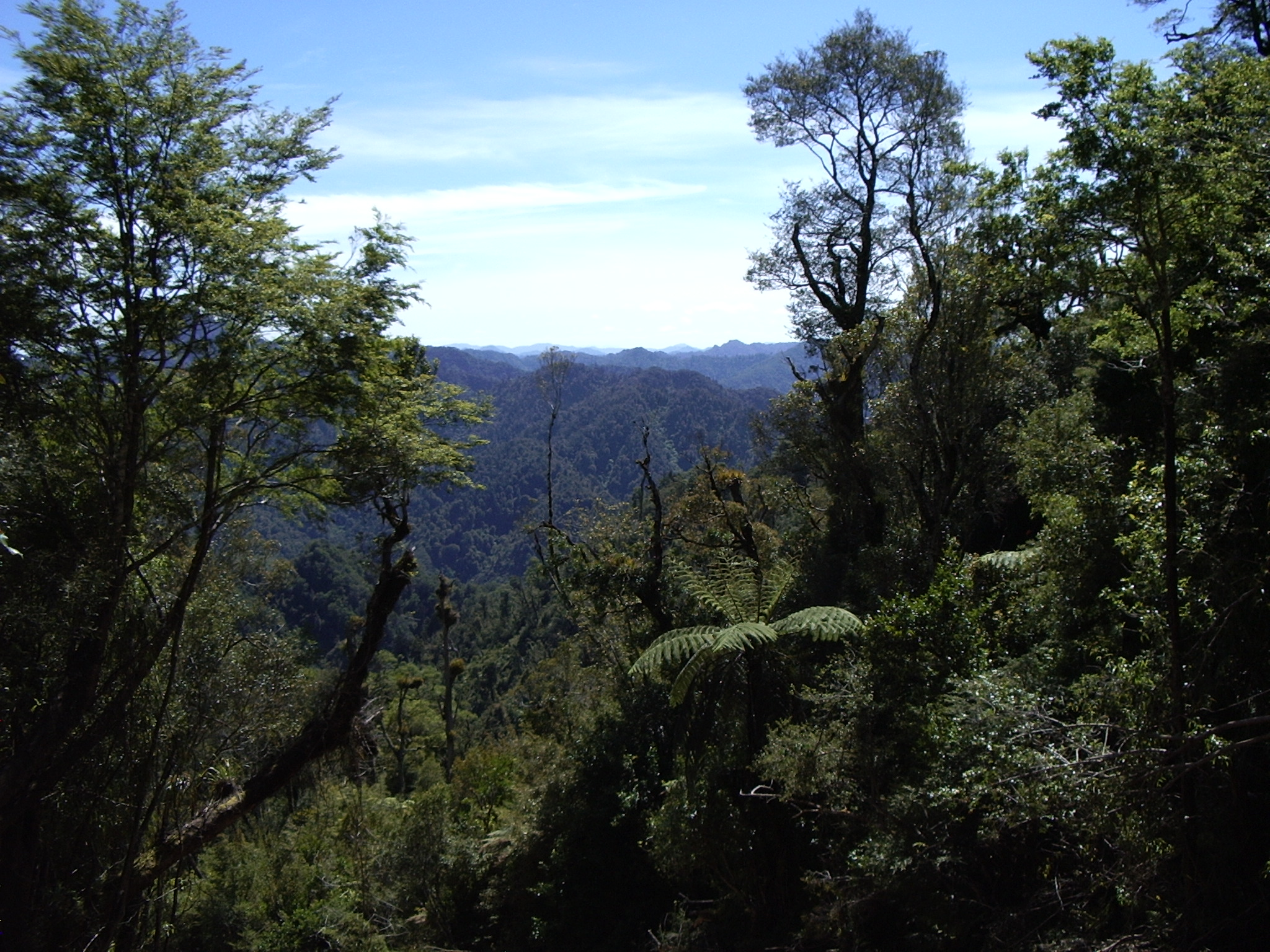
Te Urewera, the type locality of M. ngahuru

This species was first described by George William Gibbs in 2019. The male holotype specimen was collected by Gibbs on the Manuoha track in Te Urewera and is held in the New Zealand Arthropod Collection.

== Description ==
This species is very similar in appearance to its close relatives such as M. acuta, M. falcata and M. hamadelpha but can be distinguished by the shape of the male genitalia. Gibbs describes the colour of the male forewings as follows:

Forewing 3.6–4.1 mm; dark-brown costal streak very broad with broad apex which is continuous with oblique anal fascia, basal area ochreous-white, grading to pale orange-brown toward dorsum; median costal patch ochreous-white, clearly defined; a patch of intense white scales in centre of median area; subapical area orange-brown, often suffused with ochreous scales.

Although occurring in the same range as M. loxoscia and M. falcata, adults of M. ngahuru are normally on the wing at a later time.

== Distribution ==
This species is endemic to New Zealand. It is found in the Taupō, Gisborne and Wellington regions.

== Habitat ==
This species lives in damp but well-lit forests at altitudes of between 350 and 1100 m.

== Behaviour ==
The adults of this species appear later in the season in comparison to its close relatives being on the wing from December to March.
