= Mnesarchella vulcanica =

Scientific classification
- Kingdom: Animalia
- Phylum: Arthropoda
- Clade: Pancrustacea
- Class: Insecta
- Order: Lepidoptera
- Family: Mnesarchaeidae
- Genus: Mnesarchella
- Species: M. vulcanica

Binomial name
- Mnesarchella vulcanica Gibbs, 2019

Species of moth endemic to New Zealand

Mnesarchella vulcanica is a species of primitive moths in the family Mnesarchaeidae. This species is endemic to New Zealand and can be found in the Taranaki, Taupō, Gisborne and Rangitīkei regions. It very similar in appearance to others within its genus. This species is most easily confused with M. falcata. M. vulcanica can only be distinguished by dissection and its differently shaped male genitalia. It lives in damp mountainous beech and podocarp forests at altitudes of between from 800 to 1400 m and is on the wing from December to February.

== Taxonomy ==
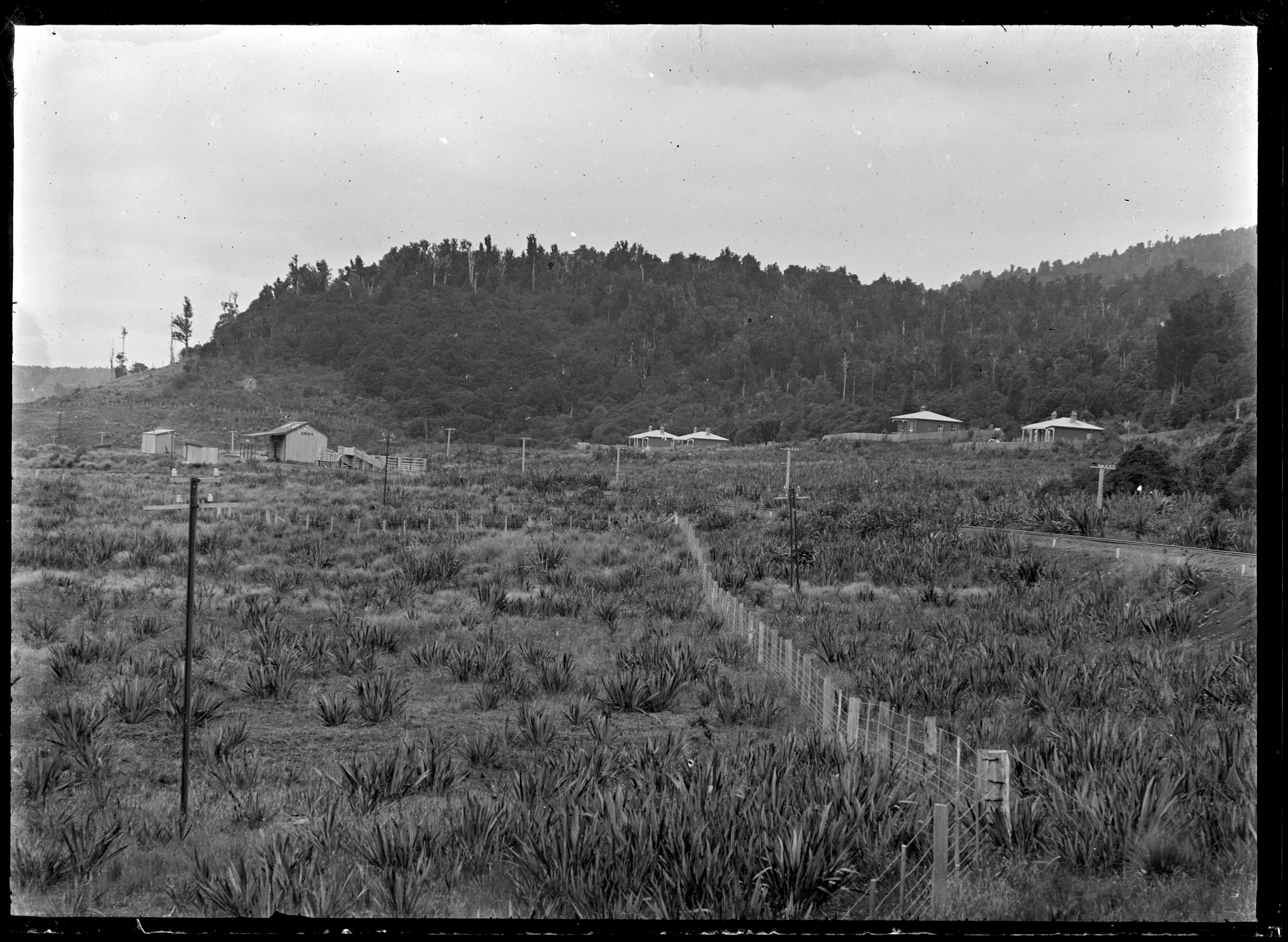
Erua, a small settlement near the type locality of M. vulcanica.

This species was first described by George William Gibbs in 2019. The male holotype specimen was collected by Gibbs on the Erua - Hauhungatahi track in the Tongariro National Park and is held in the New Zealand Arthropod Collection.

== Description ==
This species is very similar in appearance to others within its genus. The forewing of the male of the species measures between 4.3 and 4.9 mm where as the female measures 4.5 mm. Unlike some species in this genus the female is not noticeably paler than the male. This species is most easily confused with M. falcata. M. vulcanica can only be distinguished by dissection and its differently shaped male genitalia. As at 2019, the larvae of this species is unknown.

== Distribution ==
This species is endemic to New Zealand. This species is found in the Taranaki, Taupō, Gisborne and Rangitīki regions.

== Habitat ==
This species lives in damp mountainous beech and podocarp forests at altitudes of between from 800 to 1400 m.

== Behaviour ==
This species is on the wing from December to February.
