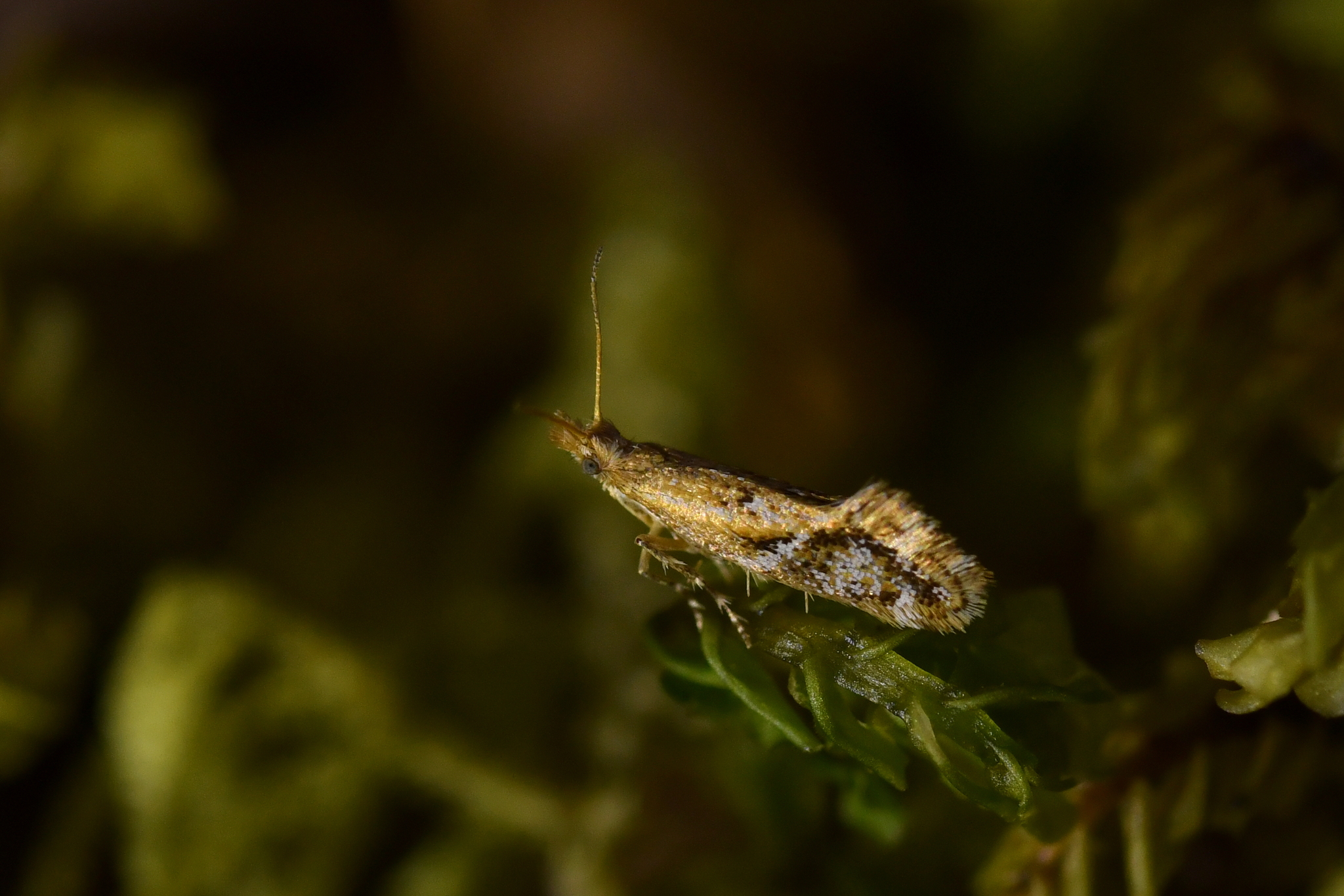

Scientific classification
- Kingdom: Animalia
- Phylum: Arthropoda
- Class: Insecta
- Order: Lepidoptera
- Family: Mnesarchaeidae
- Genus: Mnesarchaea
- Species: M. paracosma

Binomial name
- Mnesarchaea paracosma Meyrick, 1885

= Mnesarchaea paracosma =

Moth species in family Mnesarchaeidae

Mnesarchaea paracosma is a species of primitive moths in the family Mnesarchaeidae. It is endemic to New Zealand and can be found in the Kaikōura, mid and south Canterbury, MacKenzie, Otago Lakes, Central Otago, Dunedin, Fiordland and Southland areas. M. paracosma lives in a wide variety of habitats including tussock grasslands, shrubland, and damp native beech or podocarp forests, at a range of altitudes from around sea-level up to 1200 m. Adults of this species are on the wing from October to February and are day flying, although they are attracted to light at night.

== Taxonomy ==
This species was first described by Edward Meyrick in 1885. The male lectotype specimen, collected by Meyrick at Lake Wakatipu on the 15 December 1882, is held at the Natural History Museum, London.

== Description ==
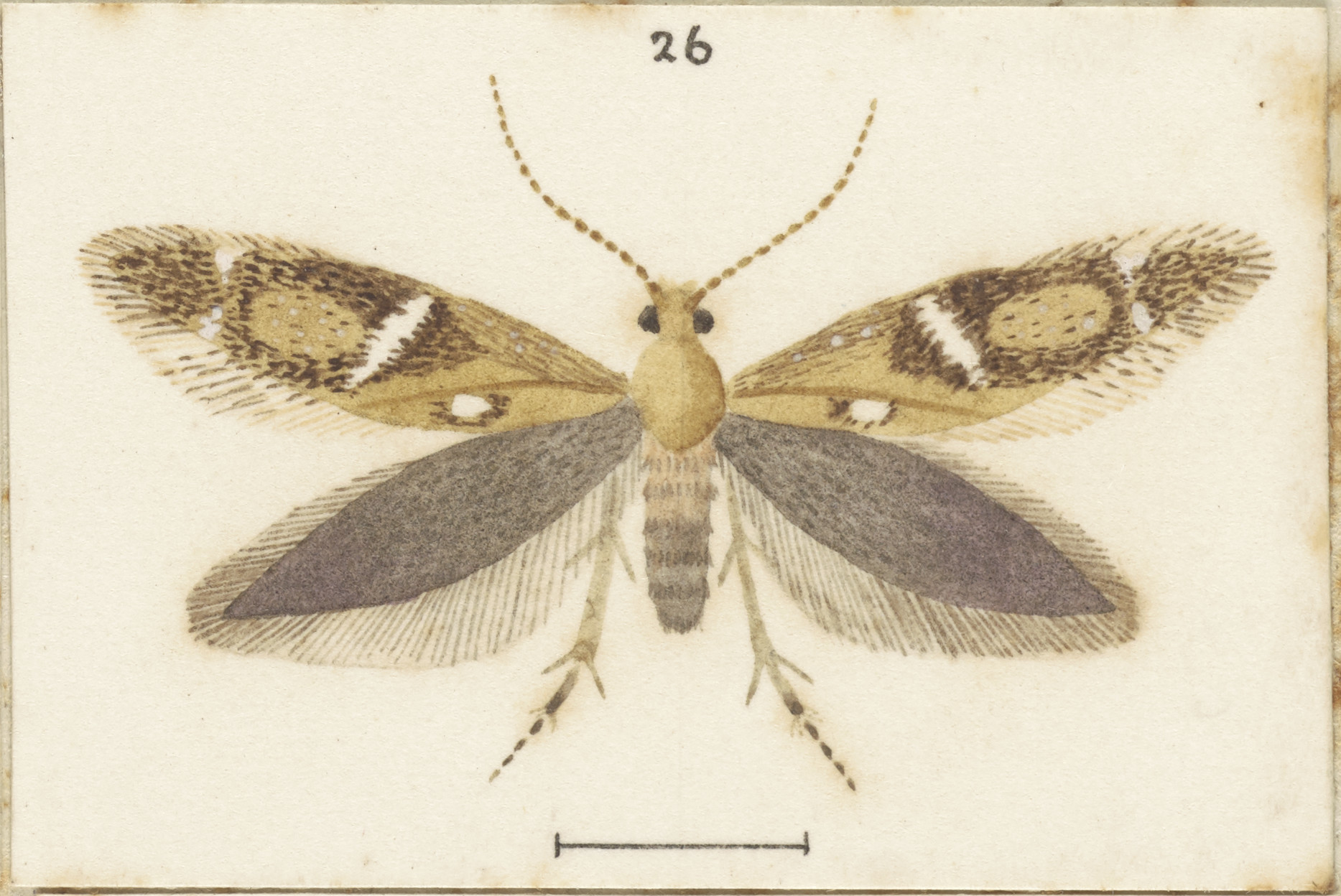
M. paracosma illustrated by George Hudson

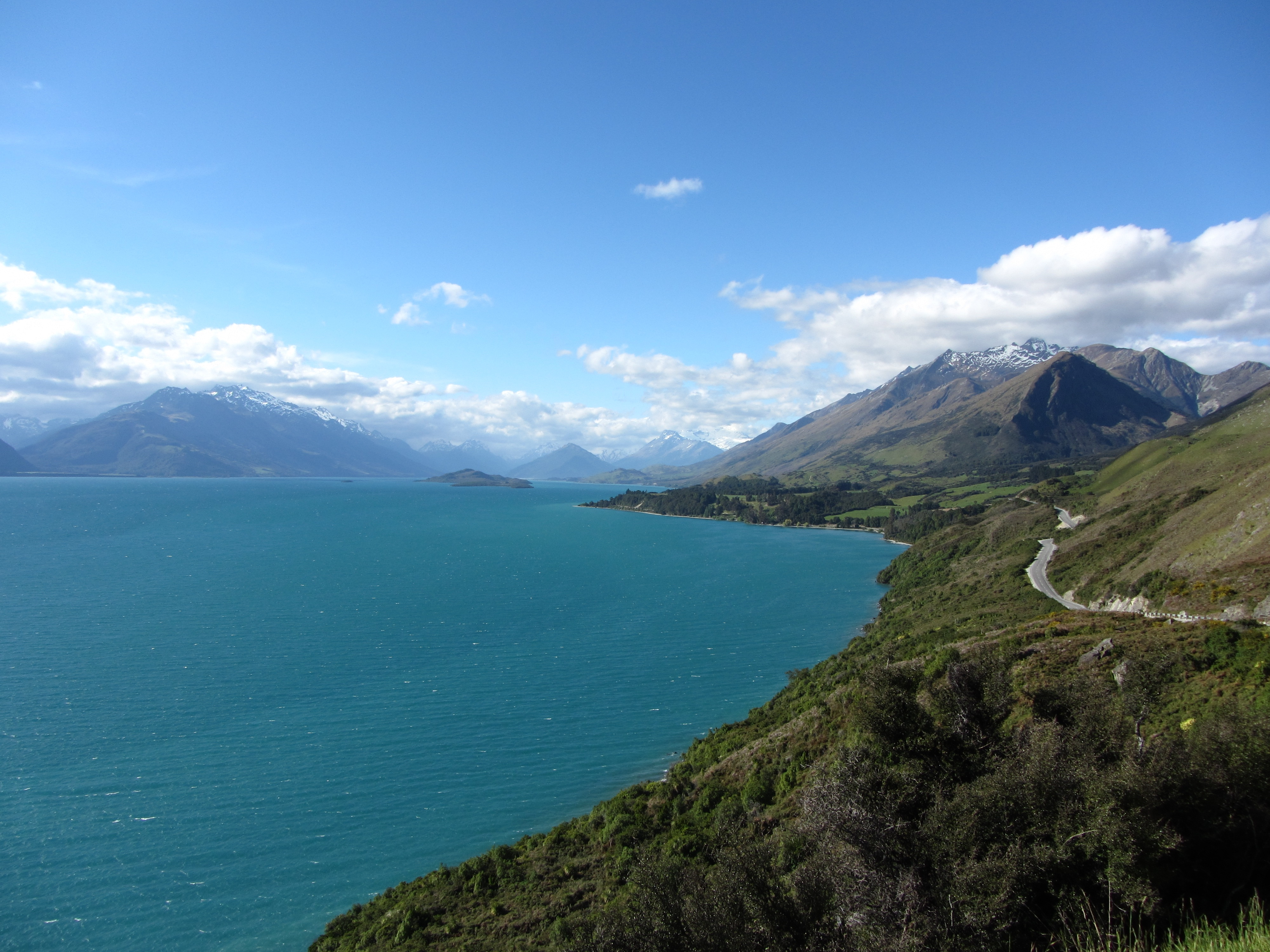
Lake Wakatipu, type locality of M. paracosma.

Meyrick described the species as follows:

Forewings yellowish-ochreous, with a wedge-shaped whitish streak from middle of costa, and some irregular dark fuscous suffusions.

Hudson went on to give a more detailed description in his 1928 publication The butterflies and moths of New Zealand. He described the species as follows:

The expansion of the wings is considerably under 3/8 in. The forewings are elliptical, pale ochreous-golden with two whitish transverse bands; the first at 1/2 strongly oblique almost reaching the tornus, the second at 3/4 nearly straight; there are a few faint brownish scales on the costa near the base and on the fold; a conspicuous patch of darker scales in the disc before the middle; several irregular elongate patches near the outer edge of the first transverse band and a very dense patch of brownish scales on the apical area; the cilia are golden-ochreous mixed with brownish scales near the apex. The hind-wings are grey with strong golden-purplish reflections; the cilia are brown-ochreous on the costa and grey on the termen.

This species is small and coloured ochreous-brown, with brown, white and yellow patches over its forewings. The antennae of M. paracosma are pale ochreous-yellow. The male of this species has unusually shaped genitalia that assists with the identification of this species.

== Distribution ==
This species is endemic to New Zealand and can be found in the Kaikōura, mid and south Canterbury, MacKenzie, Otago Lakes, Central Otago, Dunedin, Fiordland and Southland areas.

== Habitat ==
M. paracosma lives in a wide variety of habitats including tussock grasslands, shrubland, and damp native beech or podocarp forests but are likely to be found near watercourses or moist areas as a result of their larvae existing on periphyton. The species exists at a range of altitudes from around sea-level up to 1200 m.

== Behaviour ==
Adults of this species are on the wing from October to February. Although this moth is normally day flying it is also attracted to light and has been collected via night light trapping.

== Host species ==
The larvae of M. paracosma require moist periphyton and are believed to feed on a variety of fungi, algae, mosses, liverworts and fern sporangia.
