= Mnesarchella stellae =

Scientific classification
- Kingdom: Animalia
- Phylum: Arthropoda
- Clade: Pancrustacea
- Class: Insecta
- Order: Lepidoptera
- Family: Mnesarchaeidae
- Genus: Mnesarchella
- Species: M. stellae

Binomial name
- Mnesarchella stellae Gibbs, 2019

Species of moth endemic to New Zealand

Mnesarchella stellae is a species of primitive moths in the family Mnesarchaeidae. It is named in honour of Gibbs' mother Florence Stella Gibbs. This species is endemic to New Zealand and can only be found in the Nelson area for recording specimen localities as described by T. K. Crosby. This species is the largest in the Mnesarchella genus but otherwise is similar in appearance to other species contained in that genus. This species prefers very damp, dark native beech forest with plentiful moss and lives at altitudes of between 420 and 750 m. Adults of this species are on the wing in December and January.

== Taxonomy ==
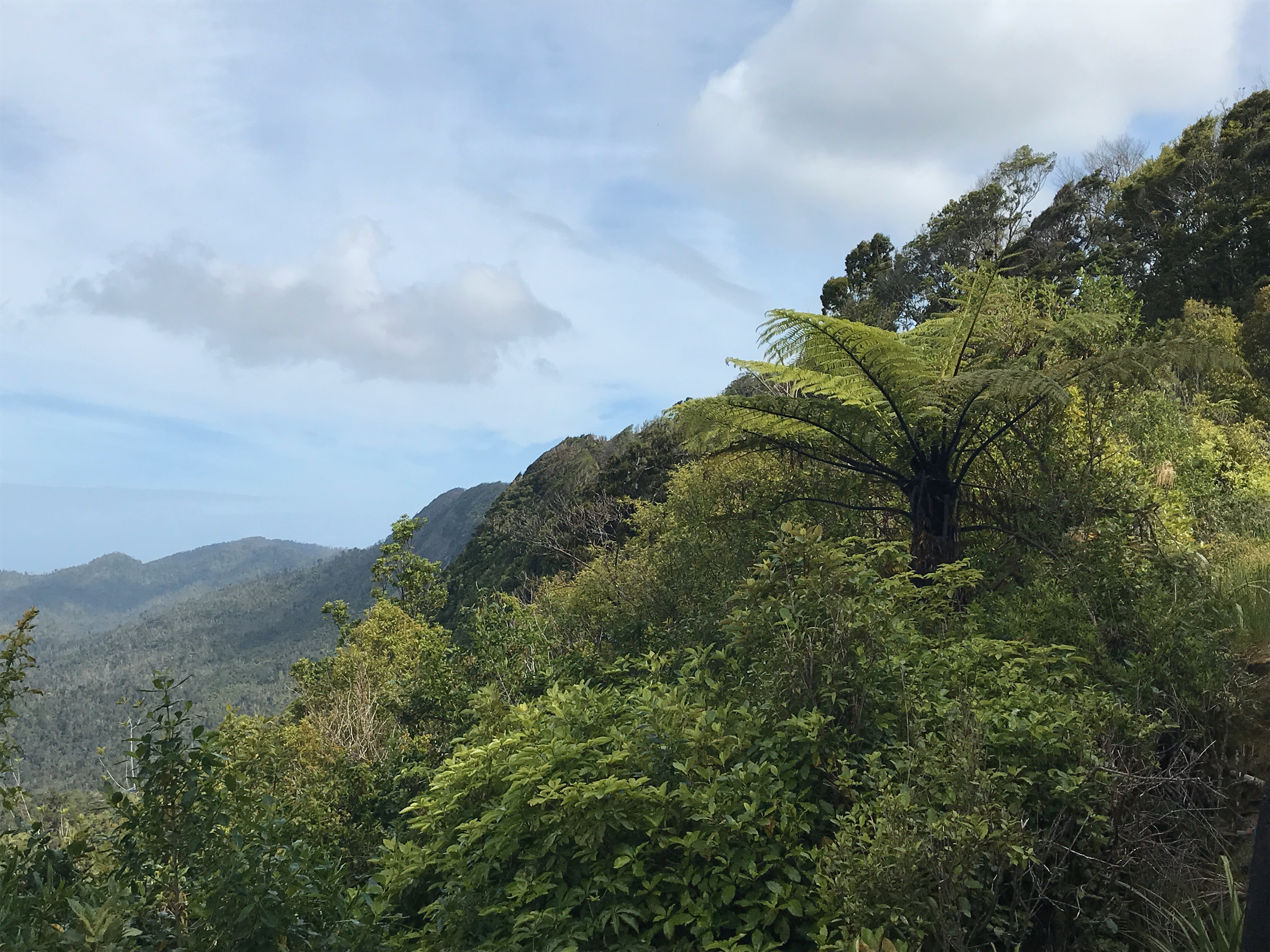
Karamea Bluff, the type locality of M. stellae.

This species was first described by George William Gibbs in 2019 and is named in honour of his mother and daughter of George Vernon Hudson, Florence Stella Gibbs. The male holotype specimen was collected by Gibbs at Surveyors Creek on Karamea Bluff in Nelson and is held in the New Zealand Arthropod Collection.

== Description ==
This species is the largest in this genus with the forewing of the male measuring between 4.3 and 5.5 mm and the forewing of the female measuring 4.7 mm. There are genitalia differences but in other respects this species is similar in appearance to its close relatives within the genus Mnesarchella. As at 2019, the larvae of this species have yet to be collected.

== Distribution ==
This species is endemic to New Zealand. It can only be found in the Nelson area as described by T. K. Crosby et al. for recording specimen localities.

== Habitat ==
This species prefers very damp, dark native beech forest with plentiful moss and lives at altitudes of between 420 and 750 m.

== Behaviour ==
Adults of this species are on the wing in December and January.
