= Mnesarchaea fallax =

Conservation status
- Not Threatened (NZ TCS)

Scientific classification
- Kingdom: Animalia
- Phylum: Arthropoda
- Clade: Pancrustacea
- Class: Insecta
- Order: Lepidoptera
- Family: Mnesarchaeidae
- Genus: Mnesarchaea
- Species: M. fallax

Binomial name
- Mnesarchaea fallax Philpott, 1927

Moth species in family Mnesarchaeidae

Mnesarchaea fallax is a species of primitive moth in the family Mnesarchaeidae. It is endemic to New Zealand. This species is found in the Taranaki, Taupō, Nelson and Buller regions. It lives in a variety of habitats such as beech forest clearings, native podocarp forest, red tussock grasslands as well as in flax wetlands and at higher altitudes of up to 1300m. Much of the life history of this species is unknown and as at 2021 the host plants of this species have yet to be confirmed. The adult moths are on the wing from October to December. This species is classified as "Not Threatened" by the Department of Conservation.

== Taxonomy ==
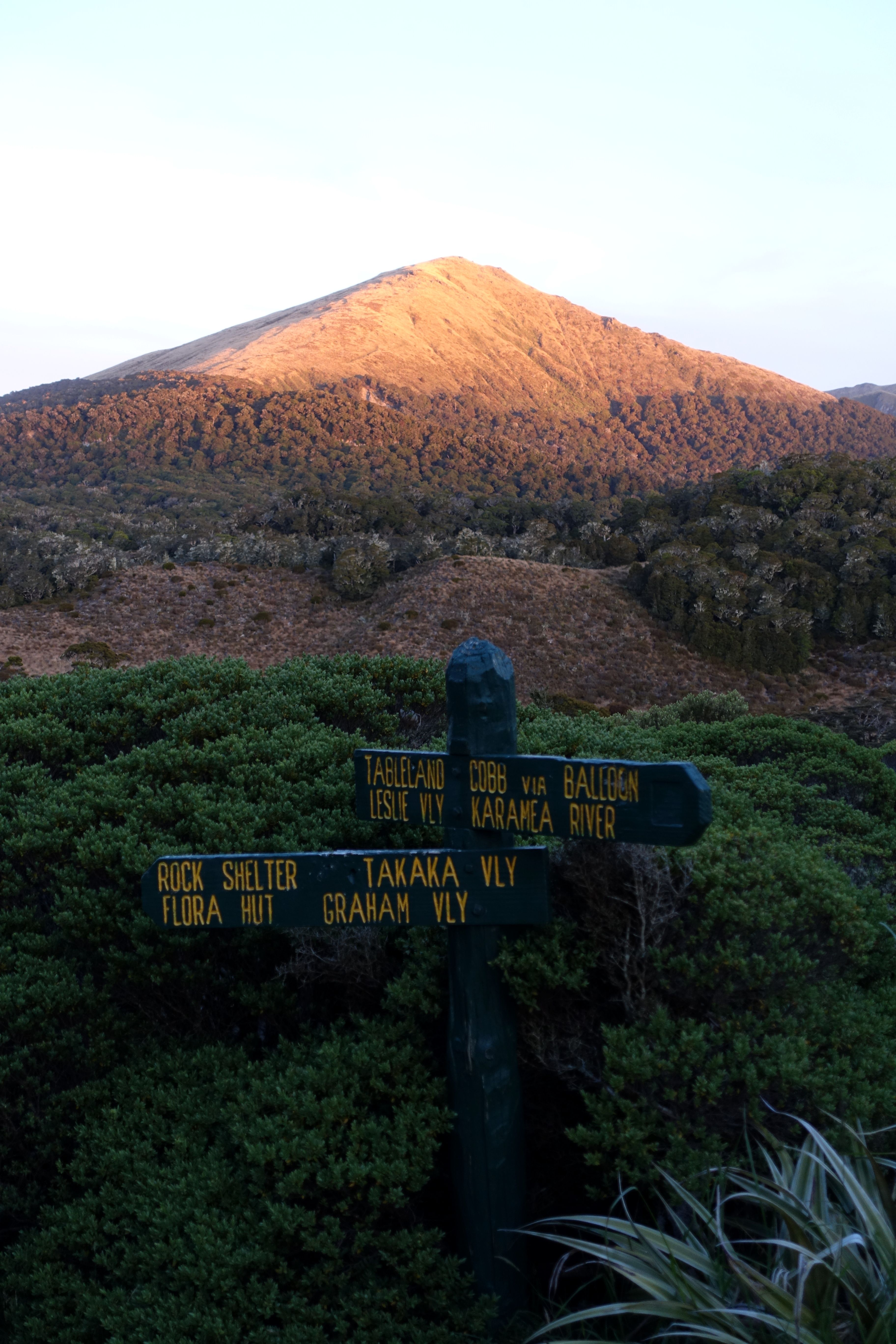
Mount Arthur, the type locality of M. fallax

This species was described by Alfred Philpott in 1927 using specimens collected at Mount Arthur tableland at 1400m in December. George Hudson discussed the species in 1928 in his book The Butterflies and Moths of New Zealand. The holotype specimen is held at the New Zealand Arthropod Collection.

== Description ==
Philpott described the species as follows:

♂ 10 mm. Head, palpi and antennae bronzy-brown. Thorax and abdomen purplish-brown. Legs greyish-fuscous. Forewings lanceolate, costa moderately arched; bronzy-brown; a white triangular spot with a few white scales above it on tornus; a few white scales beneath costa at 4/5 and along termen: fringes bronzy-brown. white on tornus. Hindwings fuscous with purplish-violet sheen apically: fringes greyish-fuscous.

This species is very similar in appearance to M. fusca but differs by being slightly larger in size and narrower of wing. It is very similar in appearance to a caddisfly. M. fallax can be distinguished from moths with a similar appearance as it has small white markings on its forewings.

== Distribution ==
This species is endemic to New Zealand. It is found in the Taranaki, Taupo, Nelson and Buller regions. Along with its type locality, this species has been collected at Ruapehu & Mount Taranaki as well as from Nelson to Lewis Pass.

== Habitat ==
This species has been found in a variety of habitats such as beech forest clearings, native podocarp forest, red tussock grasslands as well as in flax wetlands and at higher altitudes of up to 1300m.

== Biology and behaviour ==
This species is on the wing from October to December. This flight season does not appear to overlap with its close relations M. fusca or M. hudsoni. It is a day flying moth that is not attracted to light. This species is often found near water.

== Life history and host species ==
Much of the life history of this species is unknown. It has been speculated that the larval host plants may be lichen but larvae purported to be M. fallax have been collected from periphyton.

== Conservation status ==
This species has been classified as "Not Threatened" under the New Zealand Threat Classification System.
