= Mnesarchella philpotti =

Scientific classification
- Kingdom: Animalia
- Phylum: Arthropoda
- Clade: Pancrustacea
- Class: Insecta
- Order: Lepidoptera
- Family: Mnesarchaeidae
- Genus: Mnesarchella
- Species: M. philpotti

Binomial name
- Mnesarchella philpotti Gibbs, 2019

Species of moth endemic to New Zealand

Mnesarchella philpotti is a species of primitive moths in the family Mnesarchaeidae. It is endemic to New Zealand and has only been found in Fiordland. This species can be distinguished from its close relatives in the genus Mnesarchella as the patterns present on its forewing are different as is the male genitalia of this species. This species lives in southern beech forest and shrubland, where periphyton is plentiful, in the subalpine zone at altitudes of between 380 and 800 m. Adults of this species are on the wing in December.

== Taxonomy ==
This species was first described by George William Gibbs in 2019. Gibbs named the species in honour of Alfred Philpott. The male holotype specimen was collected in the Percy Valley in Fiordland by Gibbs and is held in the New Zealand Arthropod Collection.

== Description ==
This species can be distinguished from its close relatives in the genus Mnesarchella as the patterns present on its forewings are different. The brown markings present on the forewings of its close relatives are lacking in this species. The male genitalia of M. philpotti is also distinctive.

== Distribution ==
M. philpotti is endemic to New Zealand. This species is only found in Fiordland.

== Habitat ==
This species lives in southern beech forest and scrubland, where periphyton is plentiful, in the subalpine zone at altitudes of between 380 and 800 m.

== Behaviour ==
Adults of this species are on the wing in December.
