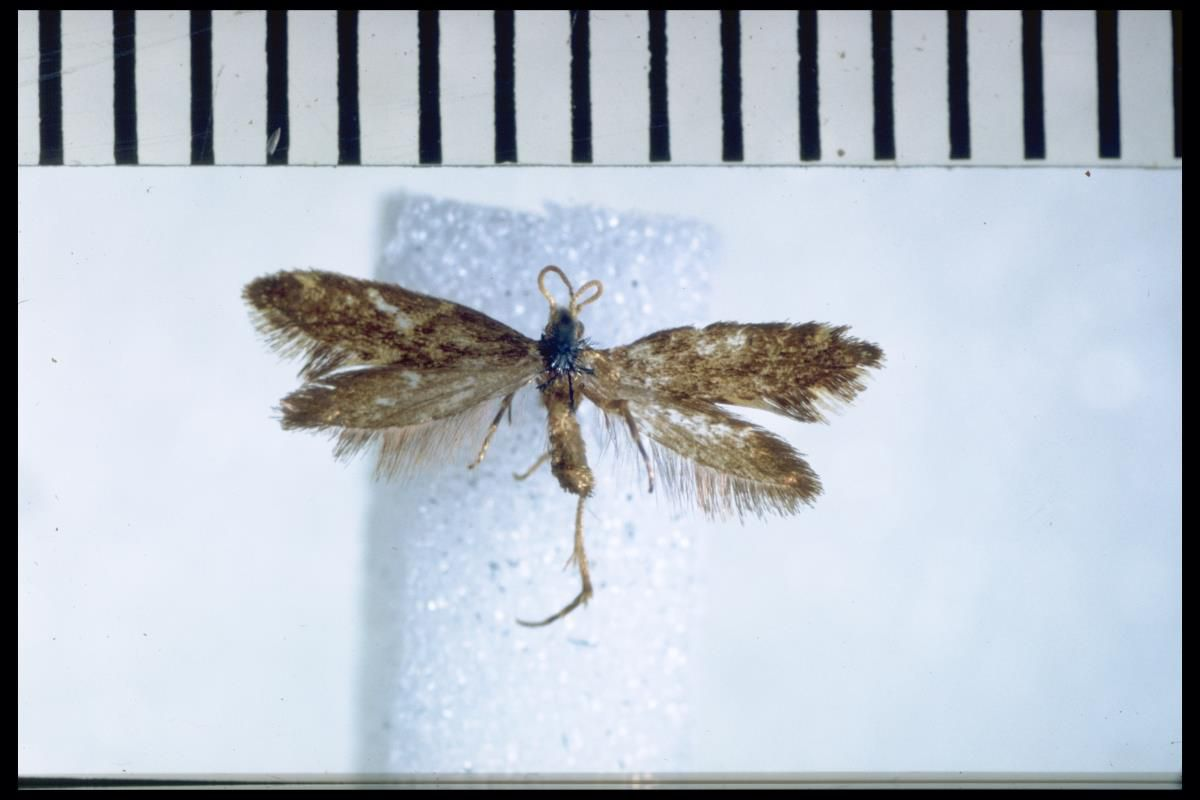

Scientific classification
- Kingdom: Animalia
- Phylum: Arthropoda
- Class: Insecta
- Order: Lepidoptera
- Family: Mnesarchaeidae
- Genus: Mnesarchaea
- Species: M. fusca

Binomial name
- Mnesarchaea fusca Philpott, 1922

= Mnesarchaea fusca =

Moth species in family Mnesarchaeidae

Mnesarchaea fusca is a species of primitive moths in the family Mnesarchaeidae. This species was first described by Alfred Philpott in 1922, and is endemic to New Zealand. The larvae of the species is bright green when young but turns a brownish green when mature. Adults of this species are small and dark brown with patches of reddish yellow on its forewings. This species is found in Nelson and Marlborough Sounds. It inhabits poorly lit forest ravines and gullies or areas near shaded waterways. Adults are on the wing between December and February.

== Taxonomy ==
This species was first described by Alfred Philpott in 1922 and named Mnesarchaea fusca. The holotype specimen, collected by Philpott at Gouland Downs in what is now known as the Kahurangi National Park in February, is held at the New Zealand Arthropod Collection.

== Description ==
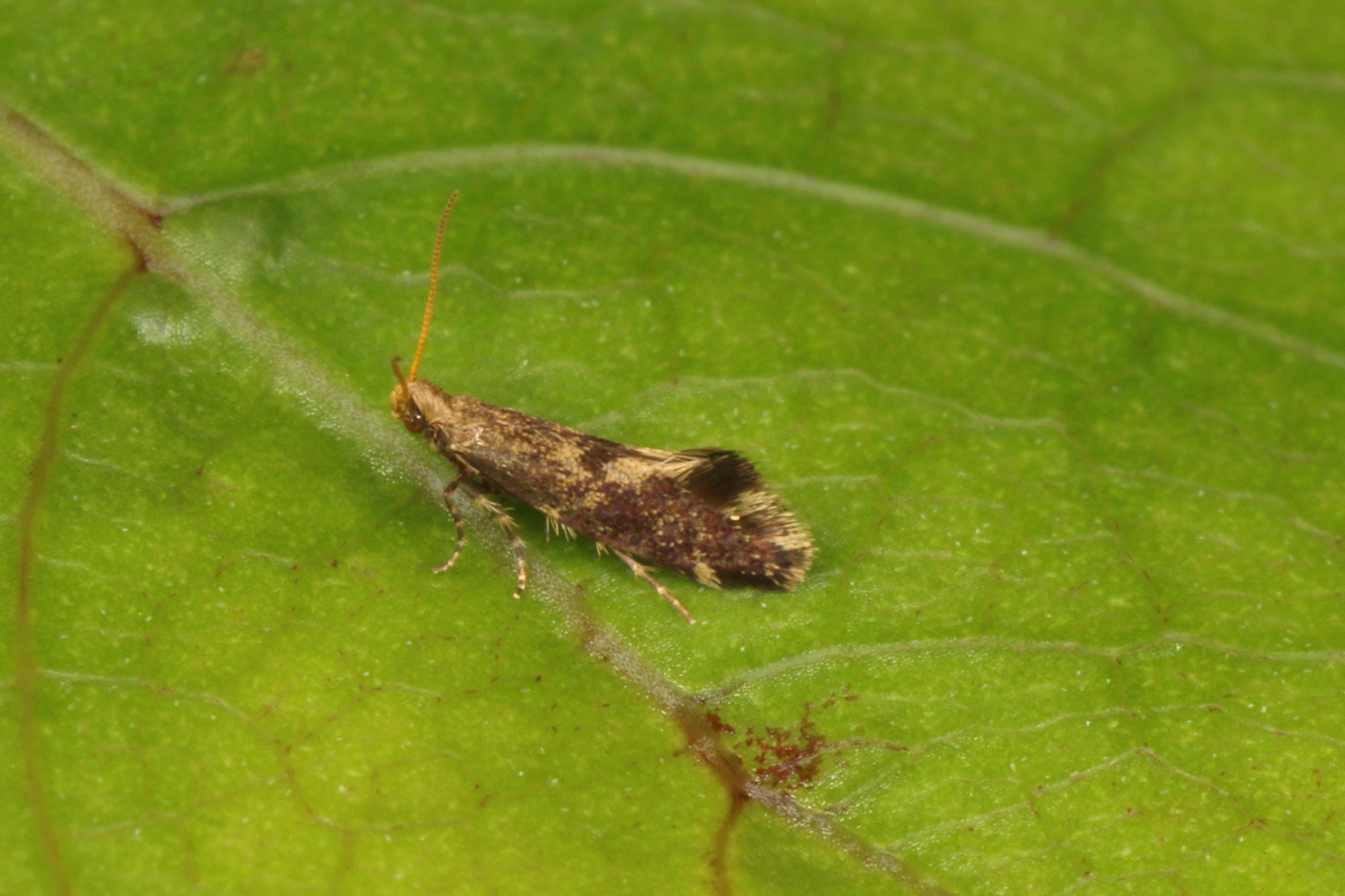
An observation of Mnesarchaea fusca

The larva of this species can reach a length of 6 mm and is bright green when young, turning a brownish-green when mature.

Philpott originally described this species as follows:

♂♀. 7 1/2-8 1/2 mm. Head whitish-yellow. Palpi and antennae yellow. Thorax fuscous, laterally yellowish. Abdomen fuscous mixed with yellow. Legs whitish-yellow, tarsi fuscous, apically ringed with yellow. Forewings, costa evenly arched, apex pointed, termen rounded, extremely oblique; dark fuscous with violet-purple iridescence; many scattered yellow scales, tending to form an outwardly - oblique fascia from costa before middle extending to disc, directly inward, on costa at 5/6; cilia fuscous, suffusedly barred with yellowish-white. Hindwings and cilia fuscous, purplish tinged.

M. fusca is small and dark brown in colour with patches of ochreous-yellow on its forewings. The maximum length of the forewing is 3.5 mm. The genitalia of M. fusca is quite distinct from similar species such as M. hudsoni and M. fallax.

== Distribution ==
This species is endemic to New Zealand. It is found in the Nelson and Marlborough Sounds districts. Although initially believed to have also been found in Wellington, those specimens are regarded as being distinct from M. fusca and are identified as M. hudsoni. This change is based on the significant differences in the genitalia of the two species.

== Habitat ==
This species inhabits poorly lit forest ravines and gullies or areas near shaded waterways. M. fusca is often collected in the presence of periphyton and can also be found near or on filmy ferns or ferns in the family Balechnaceae.

== Behaviour ==
The adults of this species are on the wing from December to February.
