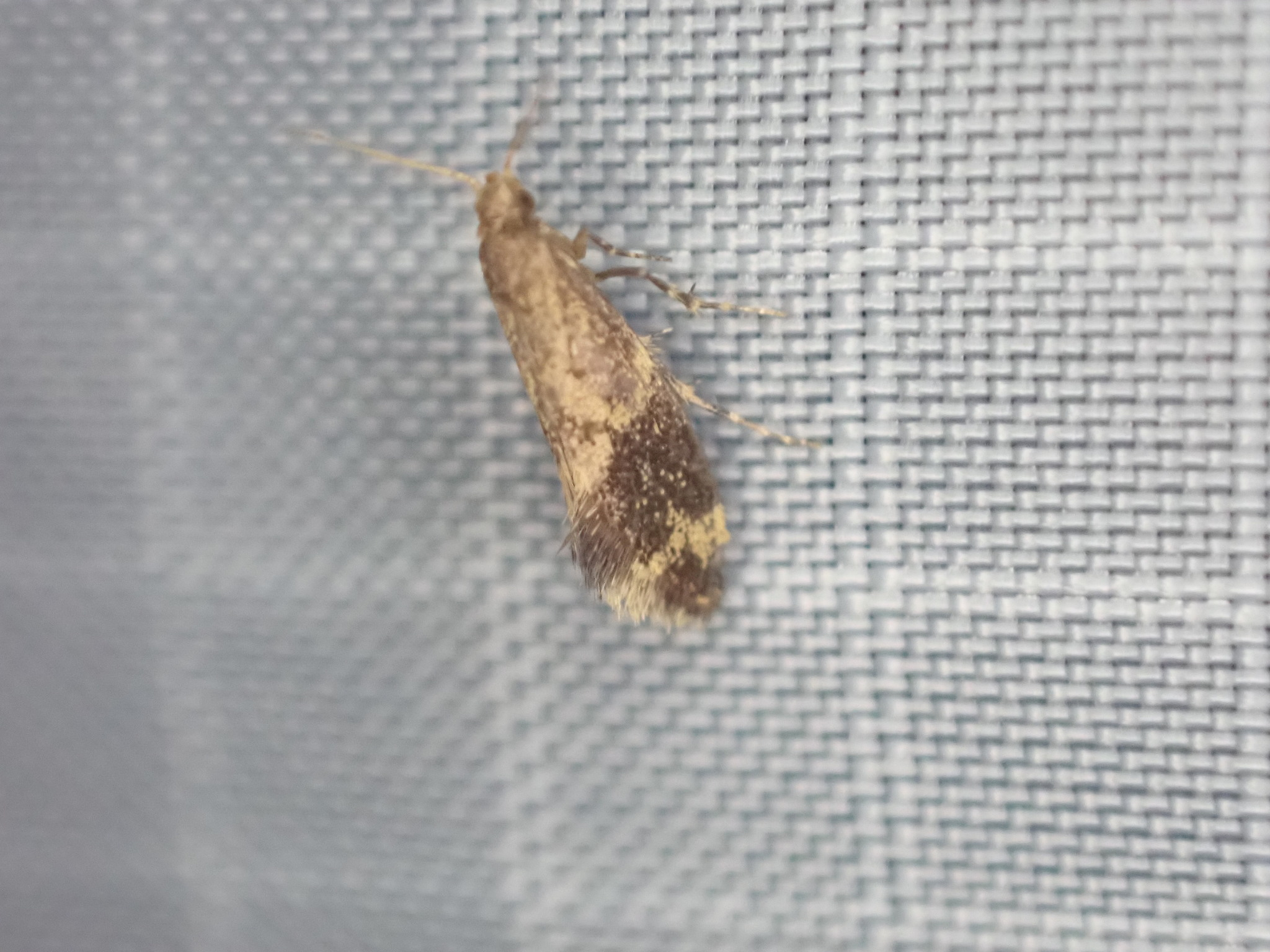

Scientific classification
- Kingdom: Animalia
- Phylum: Arthropoda
- Class: Insecta
- Order: Lepidoptera
- Family: Mnesarchaeidae
- Genus: Mnesarchaea
- Species: M. hudsoni

Binomial name
- Mnesarchaea hudsoni Gibbs, 2019

= Mnesarchaea hudsoni =

Moth species in family Mnesarchaeidae

Mnesarchaea hudsoni is a species of primitive moths in the family Mnesarchaeidae. This species was first described by George William Gibbs in 2019, and is endemic to New Zealand. It is found in the Auckland, Coromandel, Bay of Plenty, Taupo, Gisborne, Hawkes Bay, Wairarapa and Wellington regions. This species inhabits cool, damp parts of native forest or lives alongside waterways and can be found at altitudes ranging from sea-level up to 800 m. Adults of this species are on the wing from February to April. M. hudsoni is very similar in appearance to its near relatives M. fusca and M. fallax but can be distinguished via differences in male genitalia.

== Taxonomy ==
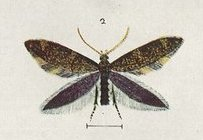
M. hudsoni illustrated by George Hudson.

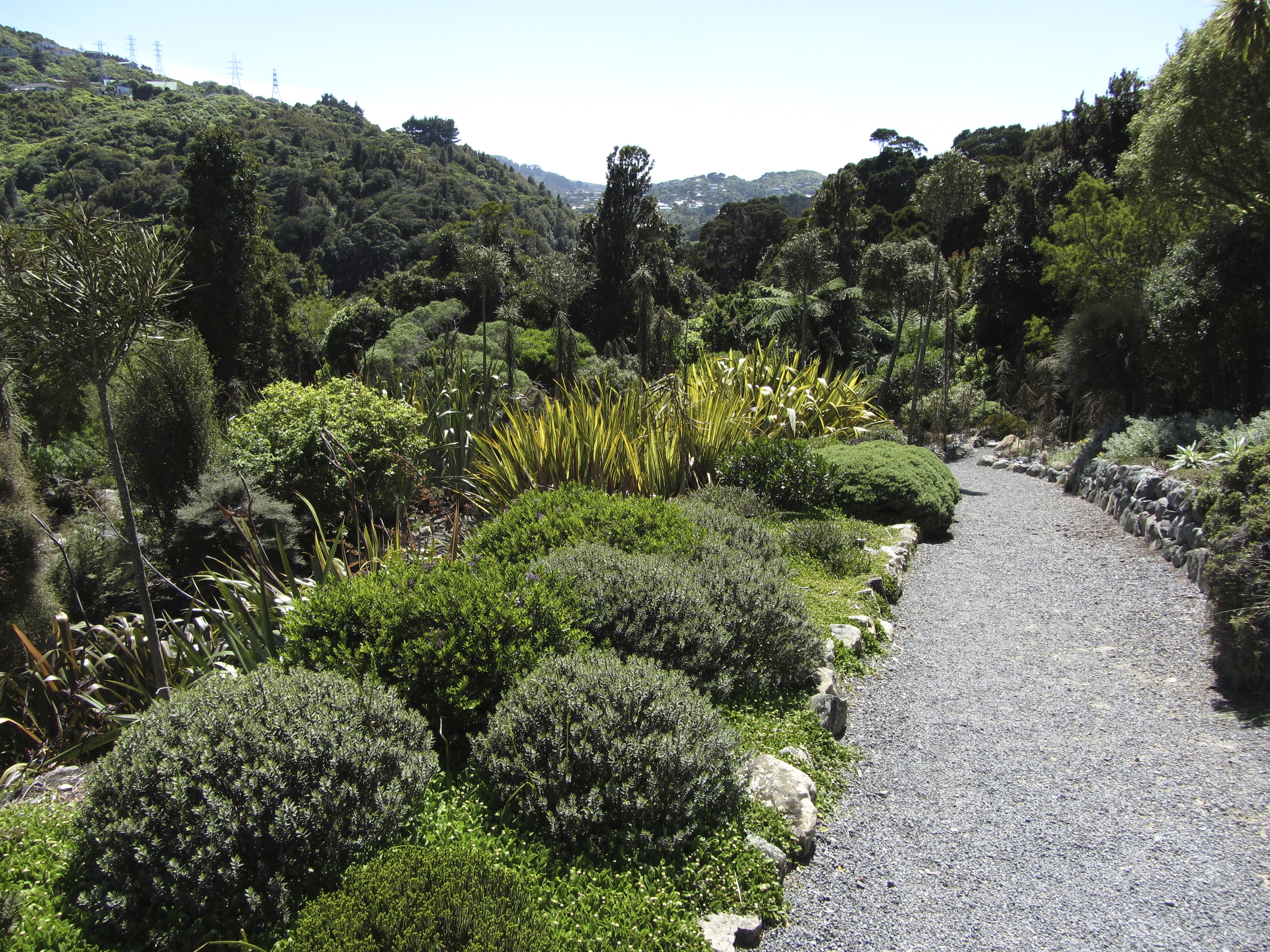
Ōtari-Wilton's Bush, the type locality of M. hudsoni

This species was first described by George William Gibbs in 2019 and named Mnesarchaea hudsoni in honour of George Hudson. The holotype specimen was collected at Ōtari-Wilton's Bush in Wellington in March 1922 by George Hudson and is held at the Museum of New Zealand Te Papa Tongarewa.

== Description ==
M. hudsoni is a small moth with a dark brown appearance with ochreous coloured scales scattered over the forewings. The antennae of the adult of this species is ochreous yellow and the forewings are greater than 3.4 mm in length. This species is very similar in appearance to its near relatives M. fusca and M. fallax. However the genitalia of M. hudsoni is quite distinct. M. hudsoni also inhabits a range that does not overlap with M. fusca.

== Distribution ==
This species is endemic to New Zealand. This species is found in the Auckland, Coromandel, Bay of Plenty, Taupo, Gisborne, Hawkes Bay, Wairarapa and Wellington regions.

== Habitat ==
This species prefers to live in cool shaded areas either deep in native forest or alongside rivers and streams. It can be found at altitudes ranging from 800 m down to sea level.

== Behaviour ==
The adults of this species are on the wing from February to April. This is a later flight season than its near relatives and can assist in distinguishing this species.
