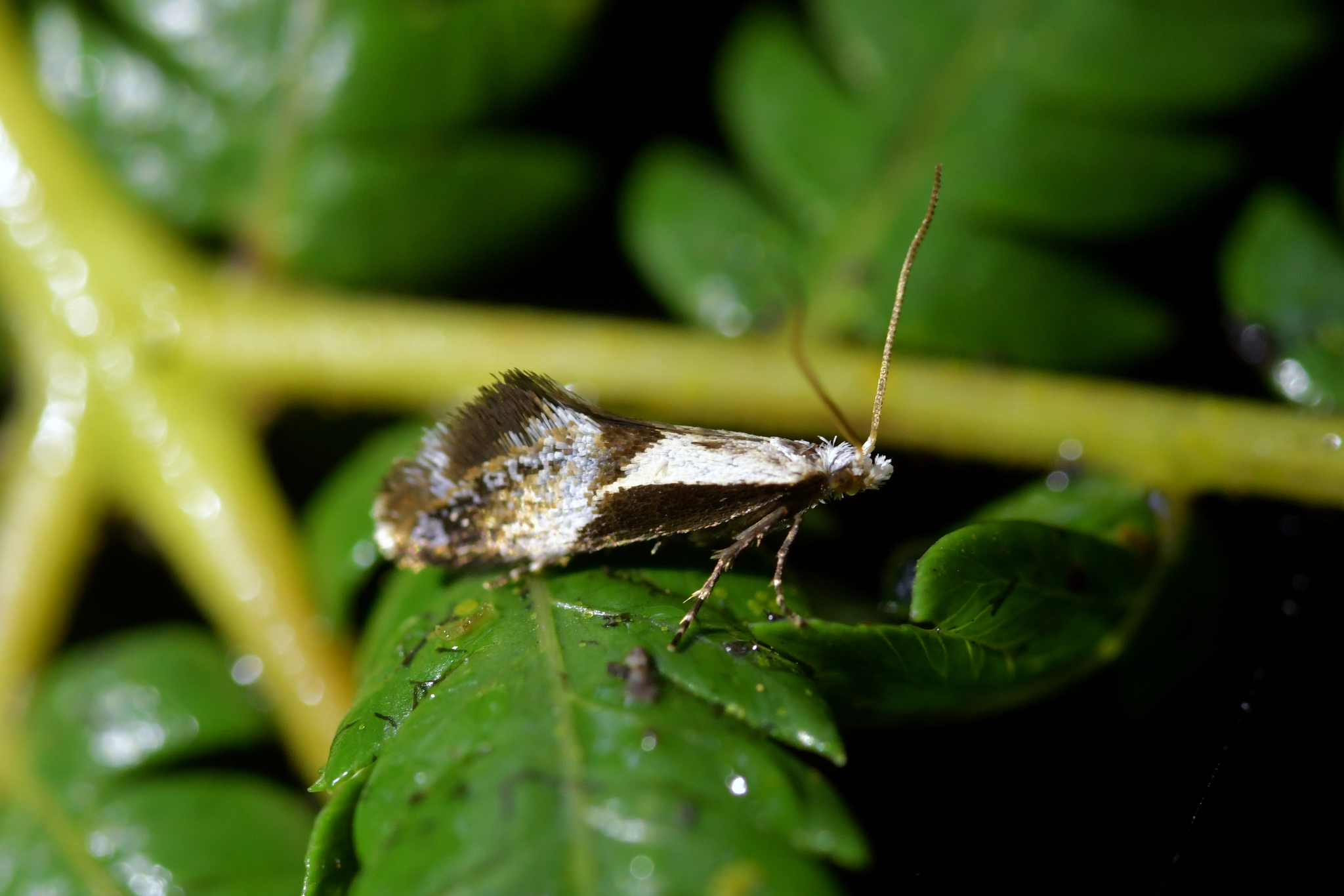

Scientific classification
- Domain: Eukaryota
- Kingdom: Animalia
- Phylum: Arthropoda
- Class: Insecta
- Order: Lepidoptera
- Family: Mnesarchaeidae
- Genus: Mnesarchella
- Species: M. fusilella

Binomial name
- Mnesarchella fusilella (Walker, 1864)

Synonyms
- Tinea fusilella Walker, 1864; Mnesarchaea fusilella (Walker, 1864)

= Mnesarchella fusilella =

Moth species in family Mnesarchaeidae

Mnesarchella fusilella is a species of primitive moths in the family Mnesarchaeidae. It is endemic to New Zealand and can be found in the Northland, Auckland, Waikato, Bay of Plenty, Hawke's Bay, Whanganui, and Wellington regions. It prefers well lit damp forests or moist fern-covered banks and lives at altitudes ranging from sea-level to approximately 500 m. Adults are on the wing from October to December. This species is normally day flying but males have been collected at night via light trapping.

== Taxonomy ==
This species was first described by Francis Walker in 1864 and named Tinea fusilella. Although George Hudson did not discuss this species in his 1928 book The butterflies and moths of New Zealand he did illustrate species under the synonym Mnesarchaea loxoscia. In 1988 J. S. Dugdale placed T. fusilella within the Mnesarchaea genus and synonymised M. loxoscia within that species. In 2019 George William Gibbs and Niels Peder Kristensen undertook a review of species within the family Mnesarchaeidae and placed this species within the newly described Mnesarchella genus. The male holotype specimen was collected in Auckland by Lt Col Daniel Bolton, RE, and held at the Natural History Museum, London.

== Description ==
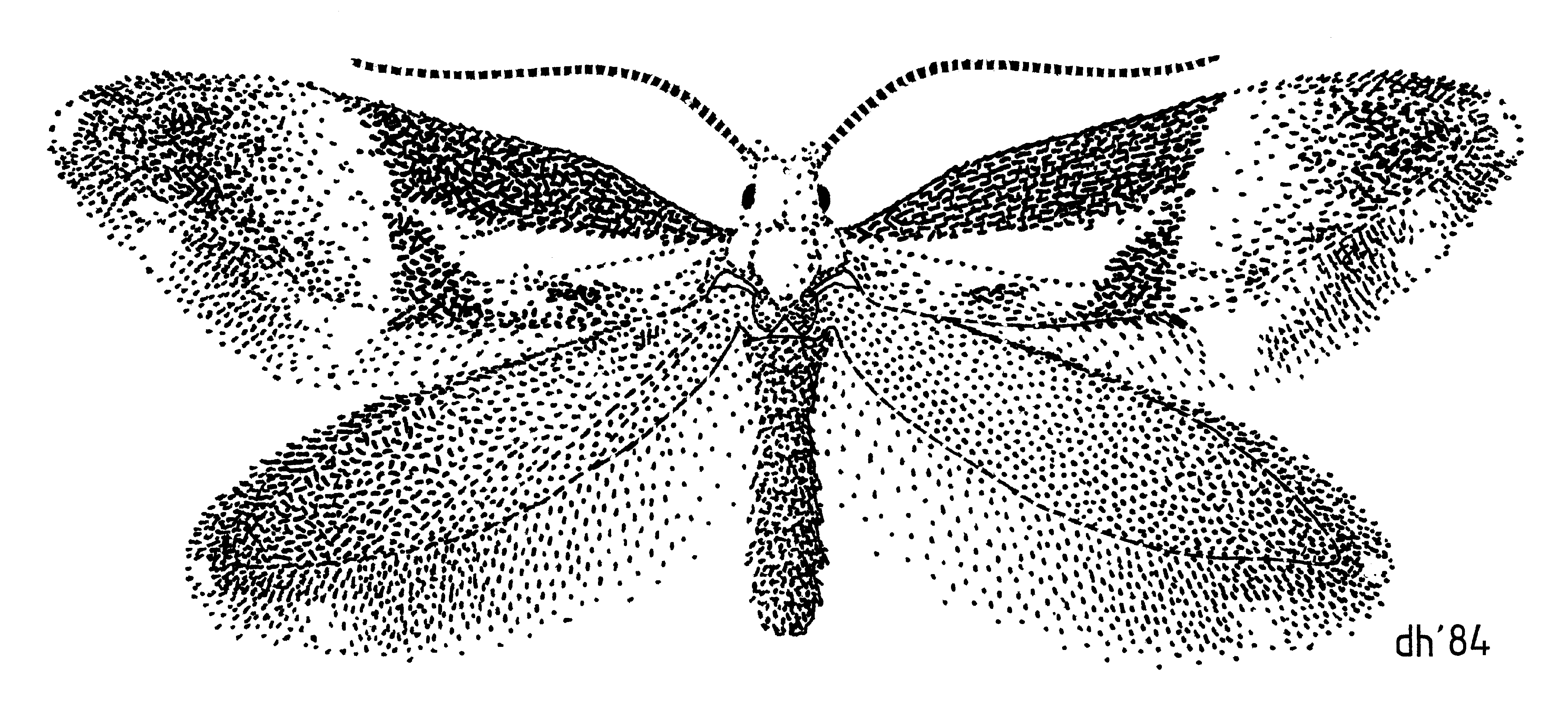
Illustration of M. fusilella by Des Helmore.

Walker originally described the species as follows:

Male. Cupreous. Head with very short hairs. Palpi very short. Antennae smooth, rather stout, much shorter than the forewings. Abdomen extending for nearly its whole length beyond the hind wings. Legs rather long and slender Wings narrow. Forewings rounded at the tips, with a white subfusiform stripe extending from the base near the interior border to near the middle, where it is connected with a diffuse whitish band; exterior border extremely oblique. Length of the body 3 lines; of the wings 8 lines.

Although M. fusilella is similar in appearance to M. loxoscia, it can be distinguished, as the former has white patches under its head and on parts of the forewing. However specimens in Northland can be more difficult to distinguish as they can appear very similar to M. loxoscia. Females can also be difficult to distinguish as their colouration may again be similar to M. loxoscia.

== Distribution ==
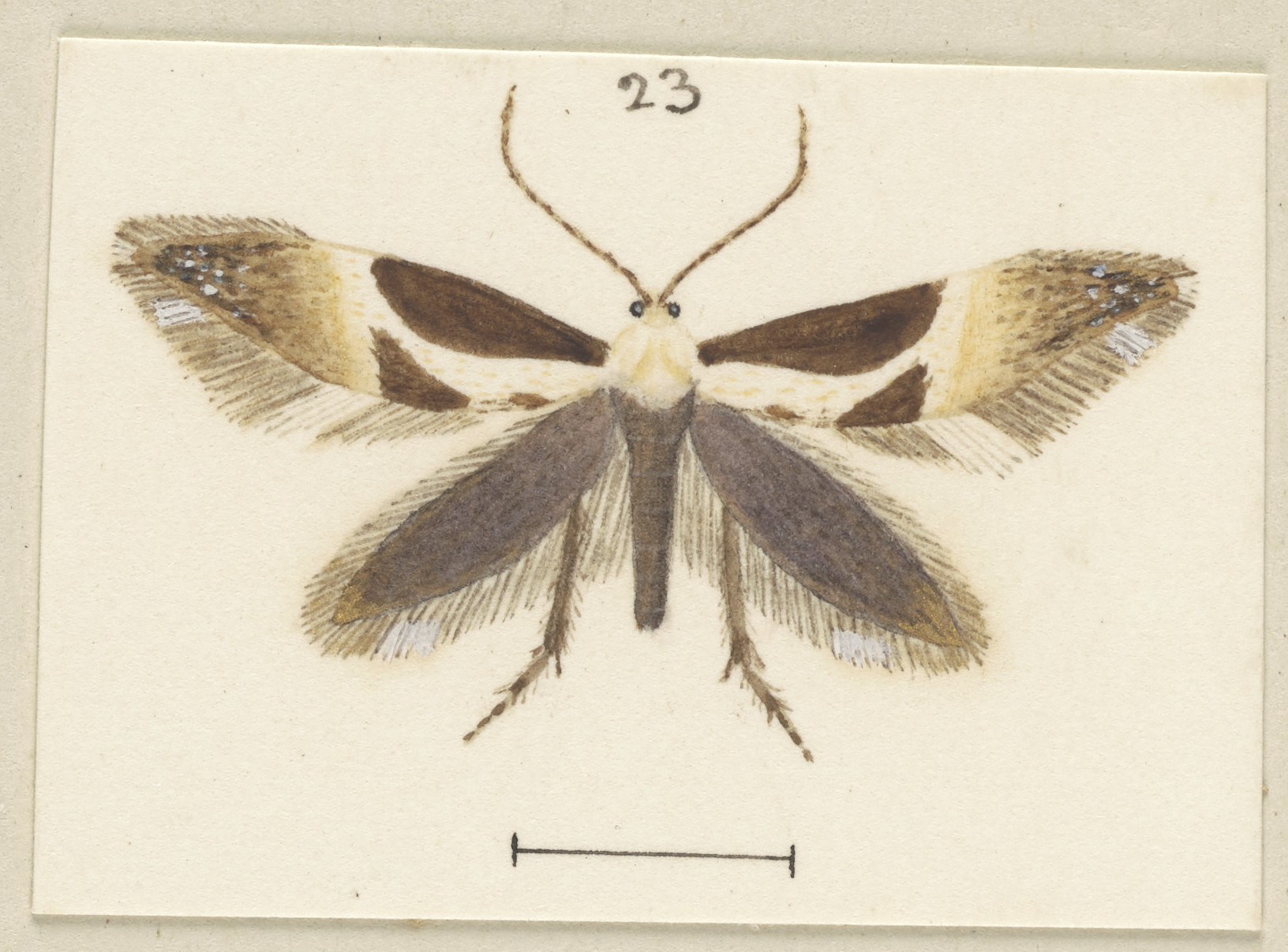
M. fusilella illustrated by George Hudson under the name M. loxoscia.

This species is endemic to New Zealand. It is found in the Northland, Auckland, Waikato, Bay of Plenty, Hawke's Bay, Whanganui, and Wellington regions.

== Habitat ==
M. fusilella prefers well lit damp forests or moist fern-covered banks. It lives at altitudes ranging from sea-level to approximately 500 m.

== Behaviour ==
Adults of this species are on the wing from October to December. This species is normally day flying but males have been collected at night via light trapping. Males fly more frequently than females and mating has been observed before midday.
