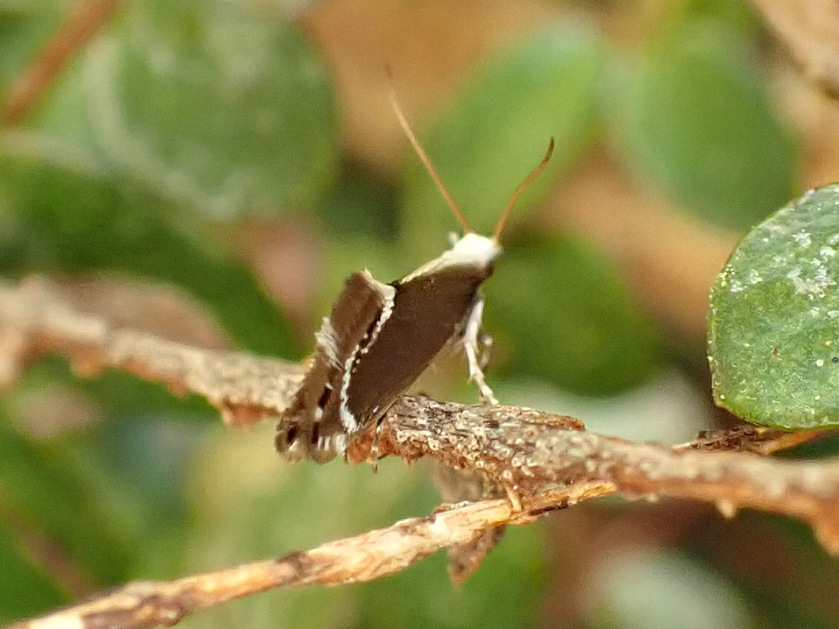

Scientific classification
- Kingdom: Animalia
- Phylum: Arthropoda
- Clade: Pancrustacea
- Class: Insecta
- Order: Lepidoptera
- Family: Mnesarchaeidae
- Genus: Mnesarchella
- Species: M. dugdalei

Binomial name
- Mnesarchella dugdalei Gibbs, 2019

= Mnesarchella dugdalei =

Moth species in family Mnesarchaeidae

Mnesarchella dugdalei is a species of primitive moths in the family Mnesarchaeidae. This species was first described by George William Gibbs in 2019, and is endemic to New Zealand. M. dugdalei lives in damp but well lit forest sites at altitudes of between 200 m and 1300 m. Adults of this species are on the wing from October to December.

== Taxonomy ==
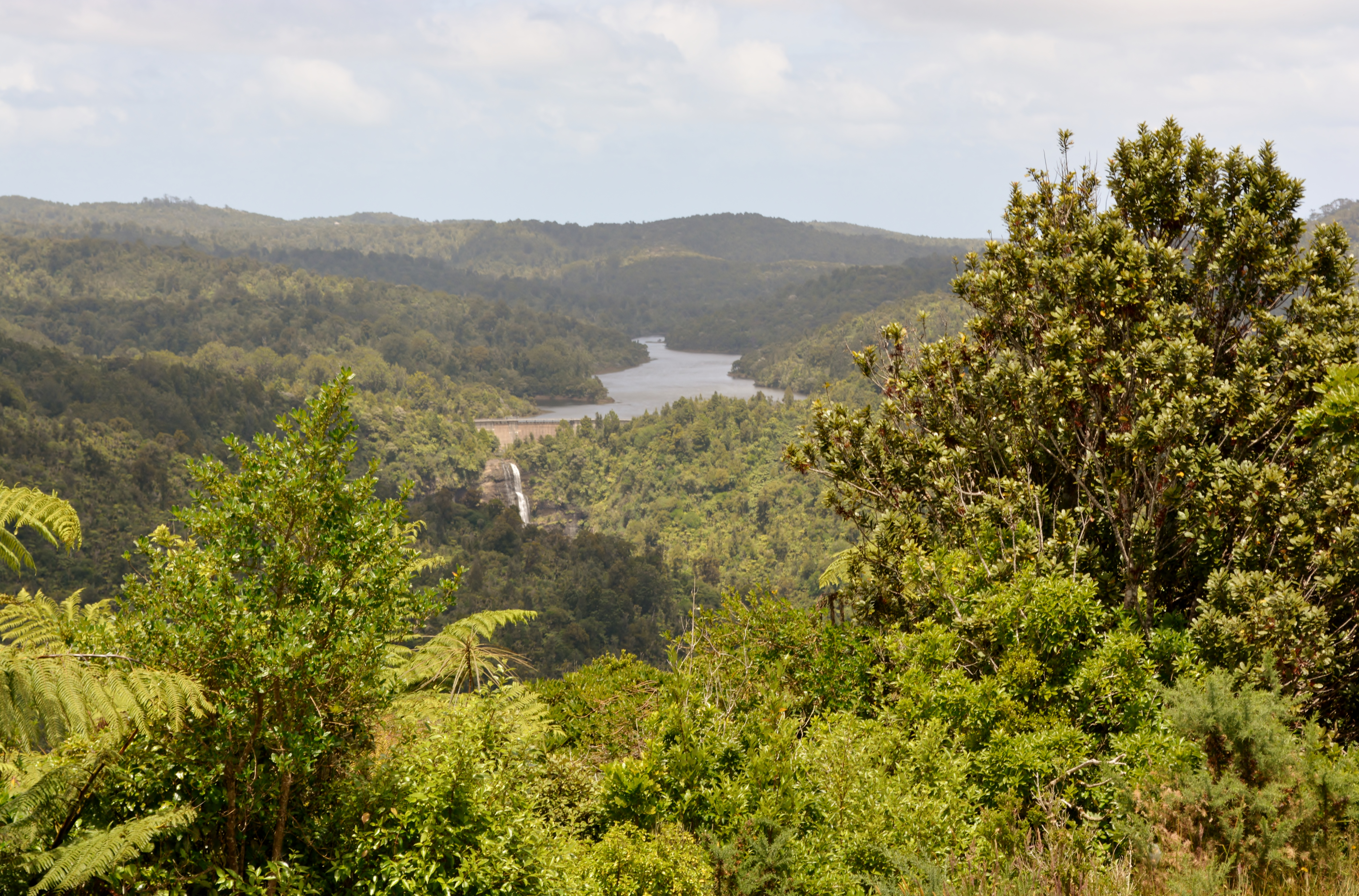
Waitakere Ranges, type locality of M. dugdalei.

This species was first described by George William Gibbs in 2019 and named M. dugdalei in honour of John Stewart Dugdale. The male holotype was collected at Fairy Falls Track in the Waitākere Ranges by Dugdale in December and is held in the New Zealand Arthropod Collection.

== Description ==
This species is small with pale brown forewings iridescent with brass colour tones. There are two white thin lines on the forewings.

== Distribution ==
This species can be found in the Auckland, Coromandel, Waikato, Bay of Plenty, Taranaki, Taupō, Gisborne and Hawke's Bay regions.

== Behaviour and habitat ==
Adults of this species are on the wing from October to December. This species lives in damp but well lit forest sites at altitudes of between 200 m and 1300 m.

== Host species ==
As at 2019, the larvae of this species are unknown as are the larval hosts of M. dugdalei.
