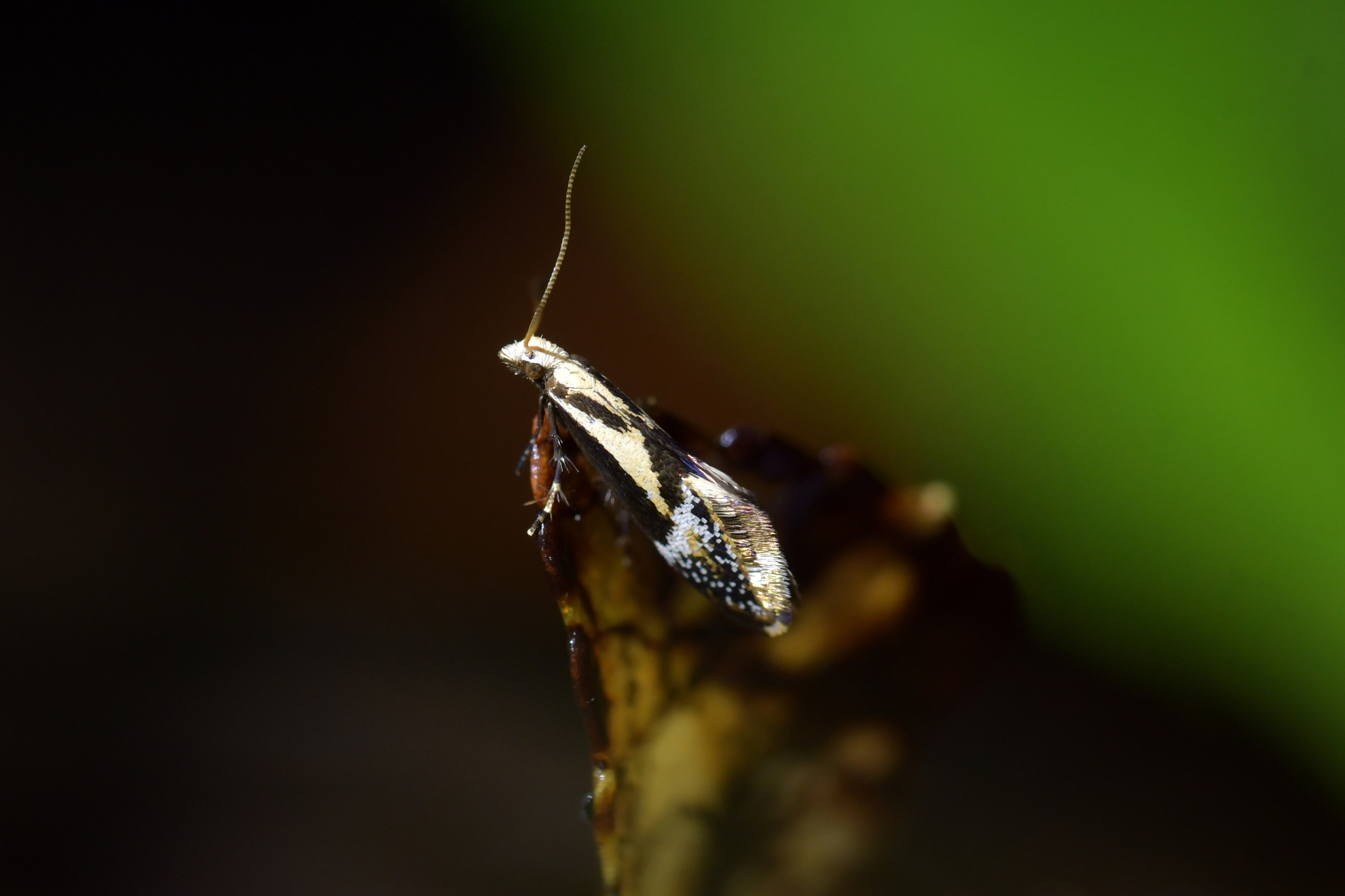

Scientific classification
- Kingdom: Animalia
- Phylum: Arthropoda
- Clade: Pancrustacea
- Class: Insecta
- Order: Lepidoptera
- Family: Mnesarchaeidae
- Genus: Mnesarchella
- Species: M. loxoscia

Binomial name
- Mnesarchella loxoscia (Meyrick, 1888)

Synonyms
- Mnesarchaea loxoscia Meyrick, 1888

= Mnesarchella loxoscia =

Moth species in family Mnesarchaeidae

Mnesarchella loxoscia is a species of primitive moth in the family Mnesarchaeidae. It is endemic to New Zealand. and is found in the Northland, Auckland, Coromandel, Waikato, Bay of Plenty, Taranaki, Taupō, Gisborne, Rangitīkei, Wellington and the Marlborough Sounds regions. Adults of this species are normally on the wing from December and January but can be on the wing as early as October.

== Taxonomy ==
This species was first described by Edward Meyrick in 1888 and named Mnesarchaea loxoscia. In 1988 J. S. Dugdale synonymised this species with M. fusilella. In 2019 George William Gibbs reviewed the species within the family Mnesarchaeidae. During this review he reinstated this species and placed within the genus Mnesarchella. The male lectotype specimen was collected by Meyrick in Auckland in December and is held at the Natural History Museum, London.

== Description ==
Mnesarchella loxoscia

Meyrick described the species as follows:

Male, female. — 11–12 mm. Head white. Palpi dark fuscous, apex broadly white. Antennae whitish-ochreous, annulated with fuscous. Thorax white, patagia dark fuscous. Abdomen dark fuscous. Legs dark fuscous, apex of joints ochreous-whitish. Forewings lanceolate; white, more or less partially suffused with pale whitish-yellowish; a dark fuscous blotch occupying costal half of wing from base to 3/5, its posterior edge inwardly oblique; a dark fuscous streak along inner margin from base, gradually narrowed, terminating in an outwardly oblique triangular dark fuscous spot, the apex of which touches lower posterior angle of costal blotch; apical third of wing pale brownish-ochreous, mixed with dark fuscous and a few white scales : cilia brownish-ochreous, with small white apical and median spots, above apex and towards anal angle dark fuscous. Hindwings dark purple-fuscous; cilia rather dark fuscous.

This species is very similar in appearance to M. fusilella. The distinguishing feature of M. loxoscia are the dark brown scales that are found underneath the head of that species.

== Distribution ==
This species is endemic to New Zealand. It is found in the Northland, Auckland, Coromandel, Waikato, Bay of Plenty, Taranaki, Taupō, Gisborne, Rangitīkei, Wellington and the Marlborough Sounds regions.

== Habitat ==
M. loxoscia lives in similar habitats to M. fusilella, that is well lit damp forests or moist fern-covered banks, but can occur at altitudes of up to 1100 m.

== Behaviour ==
The adults of this species are normally on the wing from December and January, however in the South Island this species can be on the wing earlier, from October.
