= Mnesarchella hamadelpha =

Scientific classification
- Kingdom: Animalia
- Phylum: Arthropoda
- Clade: Pancrustacea
- Class: Insecta
- Order: Lepidoptera
- Family: Mnesarchaeidae
- Genus: Mnesarchella
- Species: M. hamadelpha

Binomial name
- Mnesarchella hamadelpha (Meyrick,1888)

Synonyms
- Mnesarchaea hamadelpha Meyrick, 1888; Mnesarchaea similis Philpott, 1924

Moth species in family Mnesarchaeidae

Mnesarchella hamadelpha is a species of primitive moth in the family Mnesarchaeidae. It is endemic to New Zealand and is found in the Wellington, Marlborough Sounds, Marlborough and Nelson regions. It is frequently found at altitudes of between 800 and 1400m but can be found as low as approximately 400 m. It is often found in damp moss covered but well lit native forest. This species is very similar in appearance to M. acuta. However although M. hamadelpha is present in the same locations as M. acuta, it is usually found at higher altitudes or at later times in the year. Adults are on the wing from November to February.

== Taxonomy ==
This species was first described by Edward Meyrick in 1888 and named Mnesarchaea hamadelpha. Alfred Philpott, thinking he was describing a new species, named this species Mnesarchaea similis in 1924. In 1928 George Hudson synonymised this name with Mnesarchaea hamadelpha. In 2019 George William Gibbs reviewed the species within the family Mnesarchaeidae. During this review he placed within the genus Mnesarchella. The male lectotype specimen was collected at Mount Arthur in January by Meyrick and is held at the Natural History Museum, London.

== Description ==
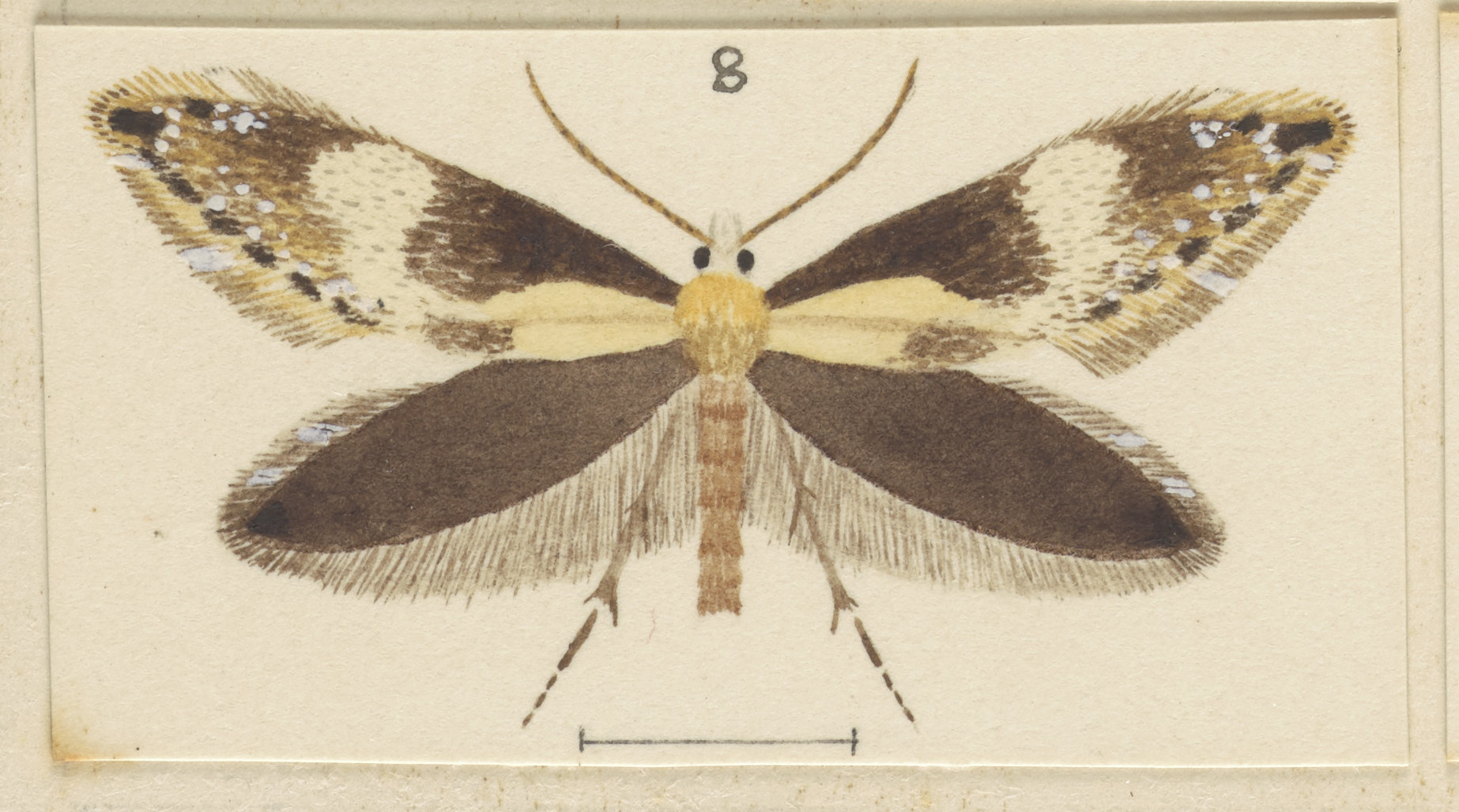
M. hamadelpha drawn by George Hudson

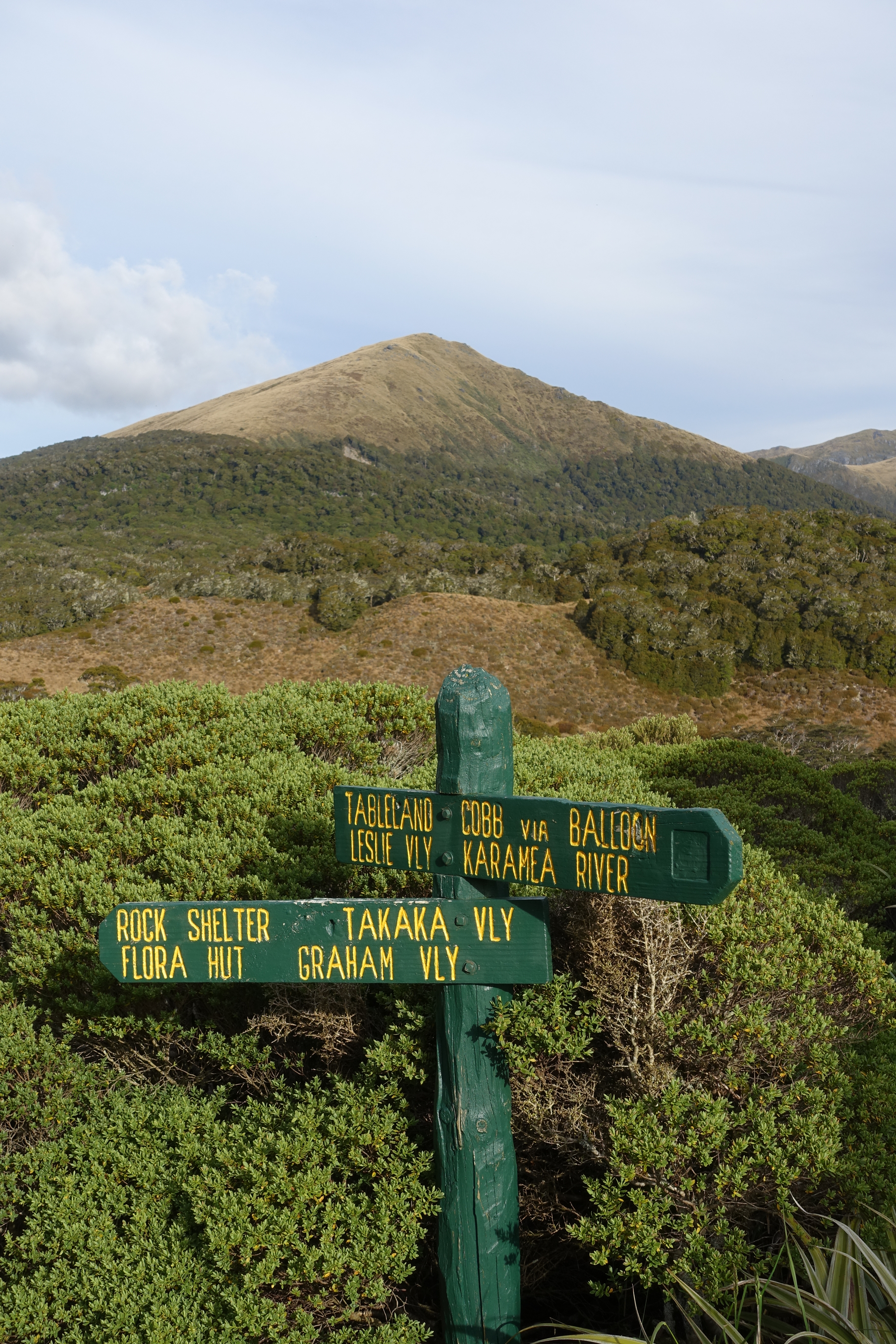
Mount Arthur, type locality of the lectotype of M. hamadelpha

Meyrick described this species as follows:

Male. — 10-11 mm. Head, antennas, and thorax whitish-ochreous. Palpi white. Abdomen dark fuscous. Legs dark fuscous, ringed with yellow-whitish. Forewings lanceolate; whitish-ochreous; a thick blackish-fuscous streak along basal half of costa, narrowed towards base, posterior extremity dilated into a vertical triangular spot reaching more than half across wing; beyond a line from 1/3 of inner margin to 2/3 of costa the ground-colour is shining golden-brownish-ochreous; a small ill- defined dark fuscous spot towards inner margin before middle; a small white spot on costa near apex, and some scattered white scales in disc below it; a black apical spot, preceded by some white scales; three ill-defined blackish spots on hindmargin, alternating with white scales : cilia golden-ochreous, with a white spot above costal spot, a small white apical spot surrounded by some black scales, a white basal clot above middle, and a white spot towards tips below middle. Hindwings rather dark purple-fuscous; cilia purplish-fuscous, with a whitish apical dot and small white median spot.

This species is very similar in appearance to M. acuta and the two can be difficult to distinguish from one another. As a general statement M. Hamadelpha has a more white basal area on its forewings which tends to be differ from the usually more ochreous colour of the same area on M. acuta forewings. The two species can be more reliably distinguished through other differences. Although M. hamadelpha is present in the same locations as M. acuta, it is usually found at higher altitudes or at later times in the year than M. acuta.

== Distribution ==
This species is endemic to New Zealand. It is found in the Wellington, Marlborough Sounds, Marlborough and Nelson regions. It is frequently found at altitudes of between 800 and 1400m but can be found as low as approximately 400 m.

== Habitat ==
M. hamadelpha is often found in damp moss covered but well lit native forest.

== Behaviour ==
This species is on the wing from November to February.
