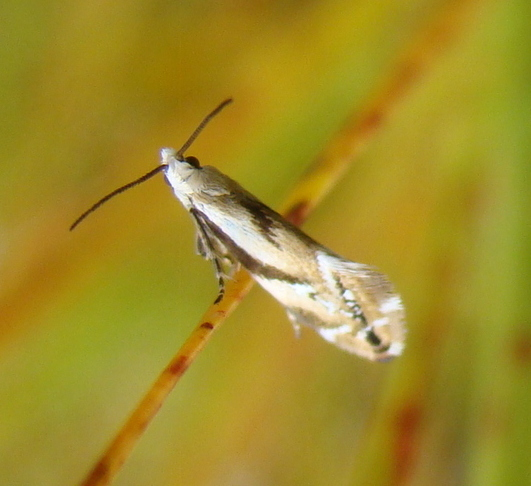
- Mnesarchella acuta

Scientific classification
- Domain: Eukaryota
- Kingdom: Animalia
- Phylum: Arthropoda
- Class: Insecta
- Order: Lepidoptera
- Family: Mnesarchaeidae
- Genus: Mnesarchella; Gibbs, 2019

= Mnesarchella =

Genus of moths, endemic to New Zealand

Mnesarchella is a genus of "New Zealand primitive moths" in the family Mnesarchaeidae. This genus is endemic to New Zealand.

== Taxonomy ==
This genus was first described by George William Gibbs in 2019.

== Species ==
- Mnesarchella acuta (Philpott, 2019)
- Mnesarchella dugdalei Gibbs, 2019
- Mnesarchella falcata Gibbs, 2019
- Mnesarchella fusilella (Walker, 1864)
- Mnesarchella hamadelpha (Meyrick, 1888)
- Mnesarchella loxoscia (Meyrick, 1888)
- Mnesarchella ngahuru Gibbs, 2019
- Mnesarchella philpotti Gibbs, 2019
- Mnesarchella stellae Gibbs, 2019
- Mnesarchella vulcanica Gibbs, 2019
