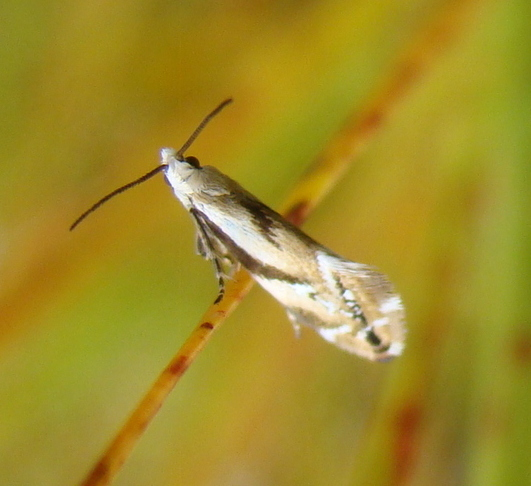

Scientific classification
- Kingdom: Animalia
- Phylum: Arthropoda
- Clade: Pancrustacea
- Class: Insecta
- Order: Lepidoptera
- Family: Mnesarchaeidae
- Genus: Mnesarchella
- Species: M. acuta

Binomial name
- Mnesarchella acuta (Philpott, 1929)

Synonyms
- Mnesarchaea acuta Philpott, 1929

= Mnesarchella acuta =

Moth species in family Mnesarchaeidae

Mnesarchella acuta is a species of primitive moths in the family Mnesarchaeidae. It was described by Alfred Philpott in 1929, and is endemic to New Zealand. It is found in the Rangitikei, Wellington, Marlborough Sounds, Nelson, Buller, Westland, Kaikōura and north Canterbury regions. It is very similar in appearance to M. hamadelpha. This species lives in a variety of damp habitats in forests or near waterways that are not exposed to all day sunlight and can be found at altitudes ranging from sea-level up to 900 m. Adults are day flying and are on the wing from October to January.

== Taxonomy ==
Although this species was first collected by Edward Meyrick in 1886 specimens were assumed to be M. hamadelpha. It was not until Alfred Philpott's genitalic studies that this confusion was resolved. M. acuta was therefore first described by Alfred Philpott in 1929 and named Mnesarchaea acuta. In 2019 George William Gibbs reviewed the species within the family Mnesarchaeidae. He placed within the genus Mnesarchella. The presumed type material is held at the New Zealand Arthropod Collection.

== Description ==
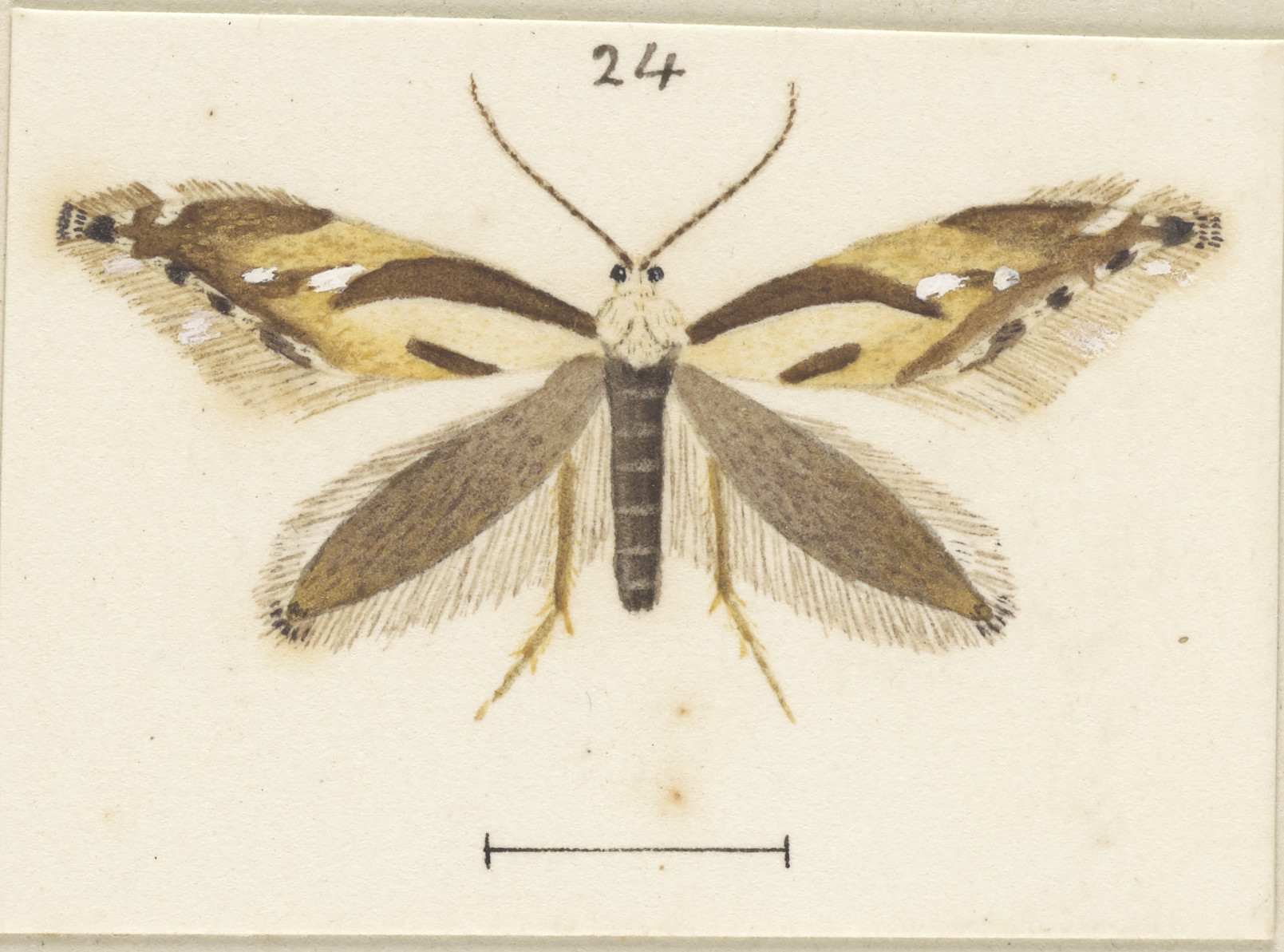
Mnesarchella acuta drawn by George Hudson, misidentified as M. hamadelpha

Philpott originally described the species as follows:

M. acuta differs from M. hamadelpha in having the thorax white instead of ochreous; also, the basal fuscous streak of the forewing is apically pointed and bent obliquely downwards and has a blunt or suffused apex.

== Distribution ==
This species is endemic to New Zealand. This species is found in the Rangitikei, Wellington, Marlborough Sounds, Nelson, Buller, Westland, Kaikōura and north Canterbury regions.

== Habitat ==
This species lives in a variety of damp habitats in forests or near waterways that are not exposed to all day sunlight. This species can be found at altitudes ranging from sea-level up to 900 m.

== Behaviour ==
Adults of this species are on the wing from October to January. It is a day time flying moth with males being frequent fliers but females being sedentary. This moth species is not attracted to light trips.
