= Mnesarchella falcata =

Scientific classification
- Kingdom: Animalia
- Phylum: Arthropoda
- Clade: Pancrustacea
- Class: Insecta
- Order: Lepidoptera
- Family: Mnesarchaeidae
- Genus: Mnesarchella
- Species: M. falcata

Binomial name
- Mnesarchella falcata Gibbs, 2019

Species of moth endemic to New Zealand

Mnesarchella falcata is a species of primitive moth in the family Mnesarchaeidae. This species was first described by George William Gibbs in 2019, and is endemic to New Zealand. It can be found in the Waikato, Taupō, Hawke's Bay and Rangitīkei regions

== Taxonomy ==
This species was first described by George William Gibbs in 2019. The male holotype specimen was collected at a Ranger Station near Mangawhero Stream in Ohakune by Gibbs and is in the New Zealand Arthropod Collection.

== Description ==
M. falcata is small with a white to pale ochreous-white head, a brownish-white thorax and forewings are coloured with shades of white to ochreous-white to pale brown to brown with patches of intense white. It is very similar in appearance to M. vulcanica and can only be reliably distinguished from that species through dissection of genitalia. The male genitalia of this species is diagnostic as it is sickle-shaped with periphallic arms.

== Distribution and habitat ==
M. falcata is endemic to New Zealand and can be found in the Waikato, Taupo, Hawke's Bay and Rangitīkei regions. This species lives in damp mountain forests made up of rimu, beech and Libocedrus bidwillii. It lives at higher altitudes of between 650 and 1,100 m (2,130 and 3,610 ft).

== Behaviour ==
Adults of this species are on the wing in November and December.
