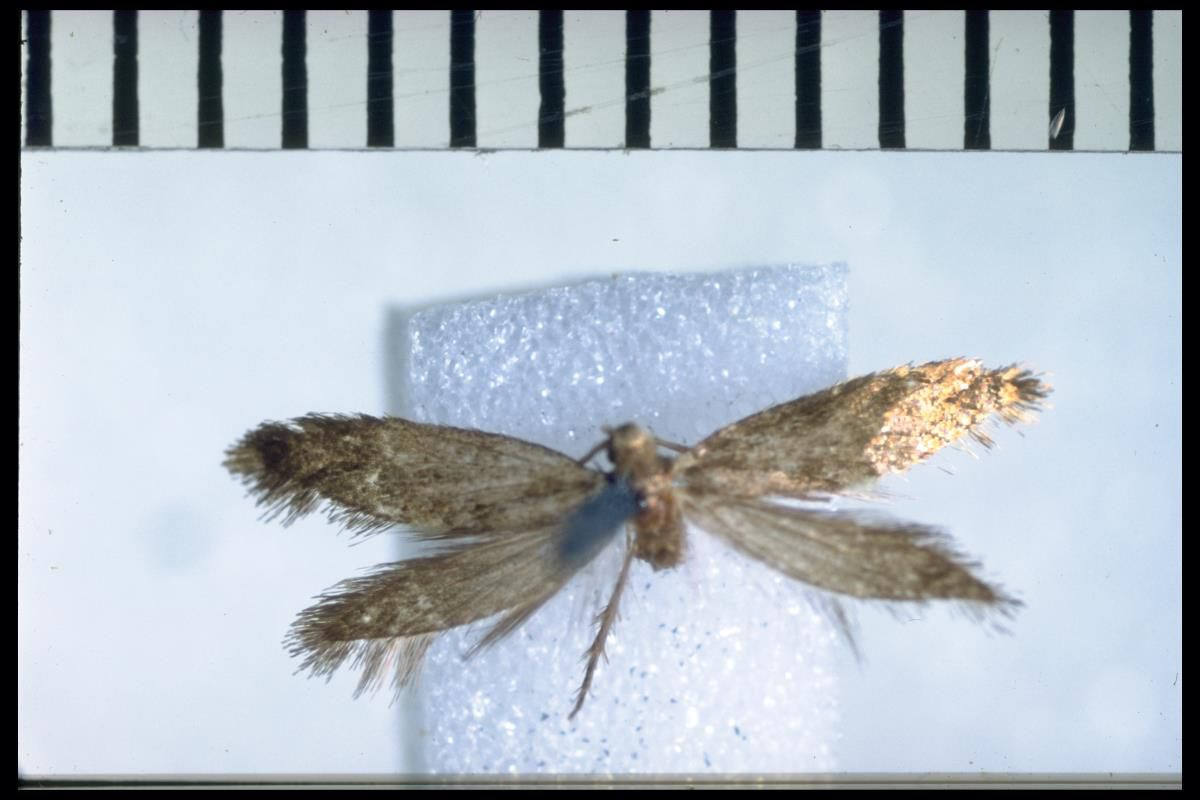
- Mnesarchella fallax

Scientific classification
- Kingdom: Animalia
- Phylum: Arthropoda
- Class: Insecta
- Order: Lepidoptera
- Family: Mnesarchaeidae
- Genus: Mnesarchaea; Meyrick, 1885

= Mnesarchaea =

Genus of moths, endemic to New Zealand

Mnesarchaea is a genus of "New Zealand primitive moths" in the family Mnesarchaeidae. This genus is endemic to New Zealand.

== Taxonomy ==
This genus was first described by Edward Meyrick in 1885.

== Species ==
These species belong to the genus Mnesarchaea:

- Mnesarchaea fallax Philpott, 1927
- Mnesarchaea fusca Philpott, 1922
- Mnesarchaea hudsoni Gibbs, 2019
- Mnesarchaea paracosma Meyrick, 1885
