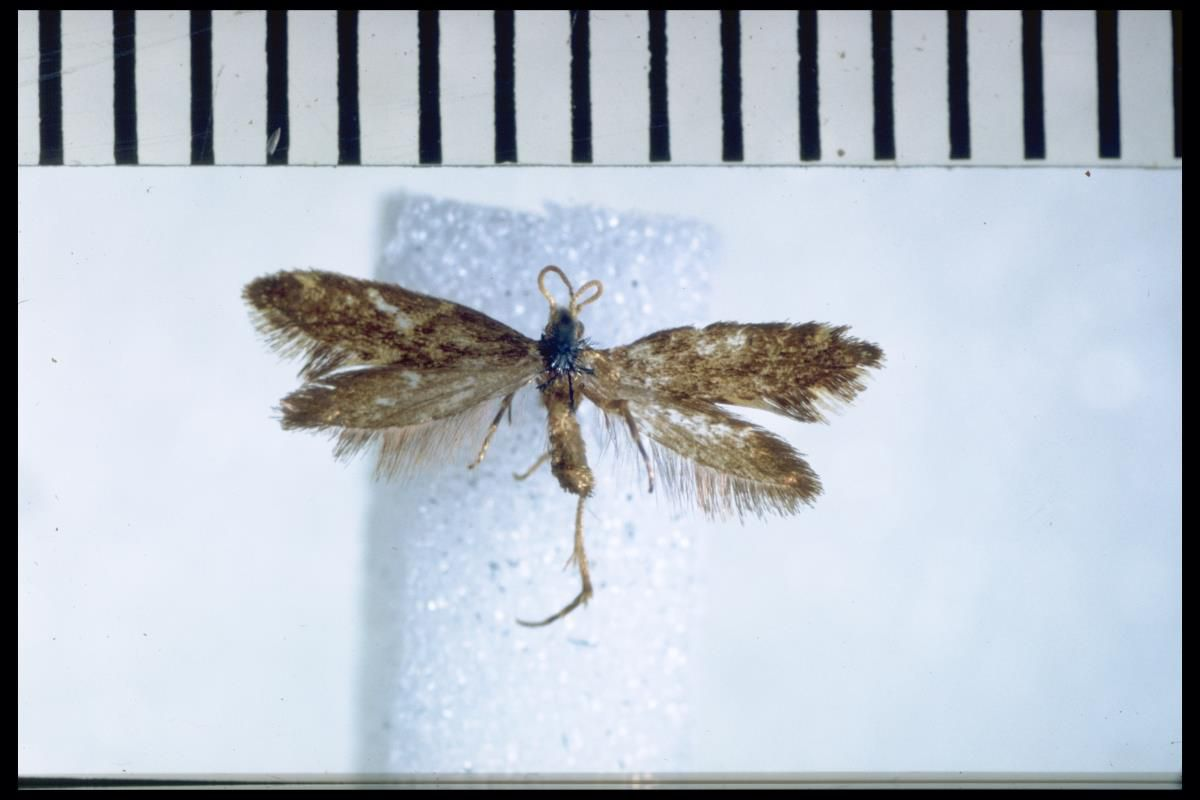
- Mnesarchaea fusca

Scientific classification
- Domain: Eukaryota
- Kingdom: Animalia
- Phylum: Arthropoda
- Class: Insecta
- Order: Lepidoptera
- Infraorder: Exoporia
- Superfamily: Mnesarchaeoidea
- Family: Mnesarchaeidae; Eyer, 1924

Genera
- See text

= Mnesarchaeidae =

Superfamily and family of insects

Mnesarchaeoidea is a superfamily of "New Zealand primitive moths" containing one family, Mnesarchaeidae, and a two genera, Mnesarchaea and Mnesarchella, both of which are endemic to New Zealand.

== Taxonomy and systematics ==
Mnesarchaeoidea constitutes the living sister taxon to the superfamily Hepialoidea. Within the superfamily, there is only one family, Mnesarchaeidae that contains two distinct genera, Mnesarchaea and Mnesarchella. The two are separated by differences in morphology and colour. Mnesarchaea are white on the head and thorax scales while Mnesarchella have brown heads and thorax scales. There are currently 14 known species belonging to this family, four belonging to the Mnesarchaea genus and 10 to Mnesarchella.

== Distribution and Development ==
The species within Mnesarchaeidae are all endemic species, occurring naturally only in New Zealand. Even within this single country, different species only occur in certain areas within New Zealand, no known species occur throughout the entire country. They live on a 1 year cycle, living as larvae and then reaching full maturity in the spring.

== Morphology and Identification ==
The mouthparts of the adult moths are functional, unlike Hepialoidea. Their notable traits are their small wingspan of less than 12mm and their brown bodies. The family has numerous unique physical traits including "wing venation with a single Rs1+2 vein; the lack of any positive wing-coupling mechanism; bilobed sternum A1 with external arms; male genitalia in which pseudoteguminal and valve plates are fused anteriorly to enclose a spacious subgenital crypt; female genitalia with unique elongate dorsal and subgenital plates, synscleritous anteriorly." The members of this family share certain traits with other members of the Lepidoptera order such as "discrete mandibles that lack articulation or musculature; a short, coiled, functional proboscis with intrinsic muscle fibres; a primitively 3-segmented maxillary palp; functional salivary glands (as in Lophocoronidae)."

== Biology and behaviour ==
The moths are mostly day-flying. The larvae live in silken galleries among liverworts and soil detritus. They tend to be active from mid Spring to early Autumn in New Zealand (October to March). Throughout the day, they are most active during daylight hours, minus times when the sun is most intense. A noticeable difference between male and females is that males are the only ones that fly to travel. Females generally lay about 32 eggs in their lifetime. Larva of the family make silk-tunnels under foliage until they reach maturity, obtaining food from the tunnel.

== Genera ==
- Mnesarchaea Meyrick, 1885
- Mnesarchella Gibbs, 2019
