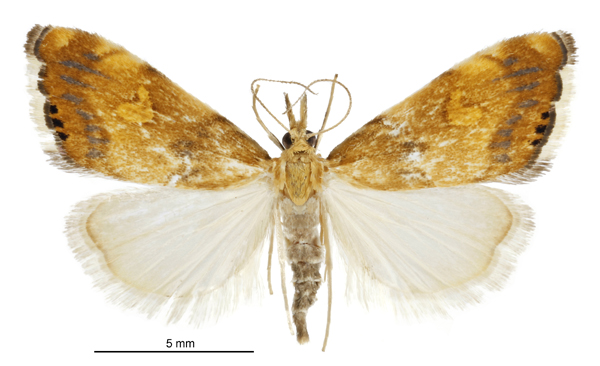
- Female
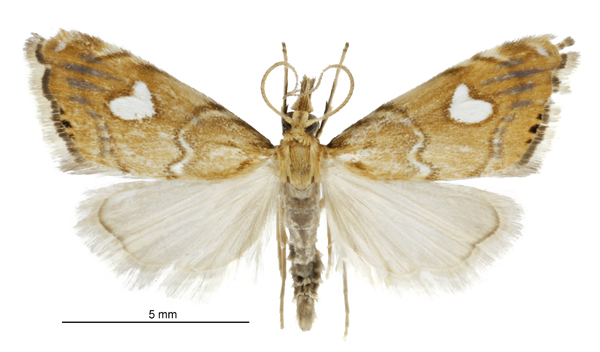
- Male

Scientific classification
- Kingdom: Animalia
- Phylum: Arthropoda
- Clade: Pancrustacea
- Class: Insecta
- Order: Lepidoptera
- Family: Crambidae
- Subfamily: Crambinae
- Tribe: Diptychophorini
- Genus: Glaucocharis
- Species: G. leucoxantha

Binomial name
- Glaucocharis leucoxantha (Meyrick, 1882)

Synonyms
- Diptychophora leucoxantha Meyrick, 1882; Pareromene leucoxantha (Meyrick, 1882)

= Glaucocharis leucoxantha =

Species of moth endemic to New Zealand

Glaucocharis leucoxantha is a moth in the family Crambidae. It was first described by Edward Meyrick in 1882. It is endemic to New Zealand and can be found in the North, South and Stewart Islands. This species inhabits native forest. Hudson states this species can be met with in South Island native beech forests at elevations of from 1,500 to 2,500 feet above the sea-level. Larvae of Glaucocharis species feed on mosses and liverworts. Adults are on the wing from November until February. This species is very variable in colouration and can be confused with G. lepidella. However it is smaller in size and the crescent shaped spot on its forewings is white or yellow rather than the silver of G. lepidella.

== Taxonomy ==
This species was first described by Edward Meyrick in 1882 and named Diptychophora leucoxantha. Meyrick gave a fuller description of this species in 1883 and explained he based his description on one specimen collected in January near Lake Wakatipu. George Hudson discussed and illustrated this species under that name in his 1928 book The butterflies and moths of New Zealand. In 1929 Alfred Philpott studied the male genitalia of this species. In 1971 David Gaskin placed this species in the genus Pareromene. However in 1985 Gaskin recognised that Glaucocharis must take precedence over Pareromene and placed G. leucoxantha into that genus. The male holotype specimen, collected by R. W. Fereday, is held at the Natural History Museum, London.

== Description ==
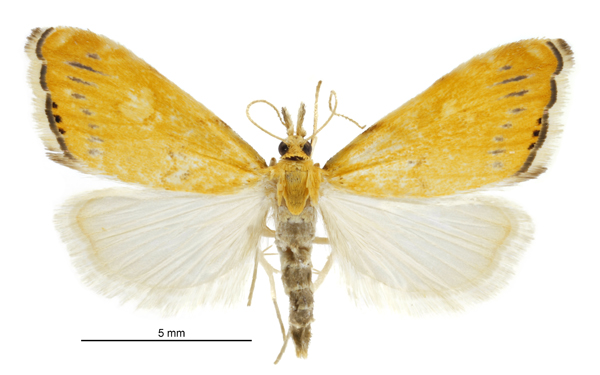
Female showing variation in colour.

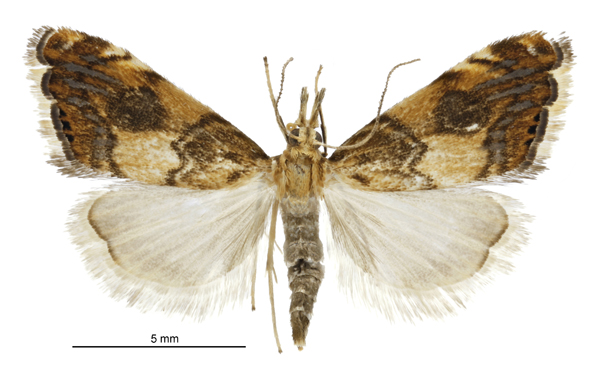
Female showing variation in colour.

Meyrick described this species as follows:

Female.—19 mm. Head and thorax light orange-ochreous. Palpi ochreous-orange, base, apex and upper surface mixed with dark fuscous. Antenne whitish-ochreous. Abdomen ochreous-whitish, posteriorly suffused with grey. Legs whitish-ochreous. Forewings triangular, very broad posteriorly, costa very gently arched, apex rounded, hindmargin oblique, sinuations moderate; light ochreous-orange, becoming deeper orange posteriorly, especially towards apex; transverse lines obsolete, second faintly perceptible, slightly darker, sinuate and outwards-curved, from about 3/4 of costa to 4/5 of inner margin; a comparatively rather large oval snow-white spot in dise beyond middle, suffusedly margined with dark fuscous, anterior extremity produced upwards into a blunt tooth; a transverse series of eight very short slender longitudinal leaden-metallic streaks on second line, second and third from costa considerably longer than the rest: cilia ochreous-white, with a dark grey spot at apex and another at anal angle, and a deep grey brassy-metallic basal line. Hindwings white, towards hindmargin faintly yellowish-tinged; cilia white.

The forewing colouration of this species is extremely variable. This species is similar in appearance to G. lepidella but is smaller in size and the crescent shaped spot on its forewings is white or yellow rather than the silver of G. lepidella. Gaskin stated the silvery veins in the subterminal region of the forewing are also diagnostic.

== Distribution ==
This species is endemic to New Zealand. It is found in the North, South Islands and Stewart at lowland to subalpine altitudes.

== Habitat and hosts ==
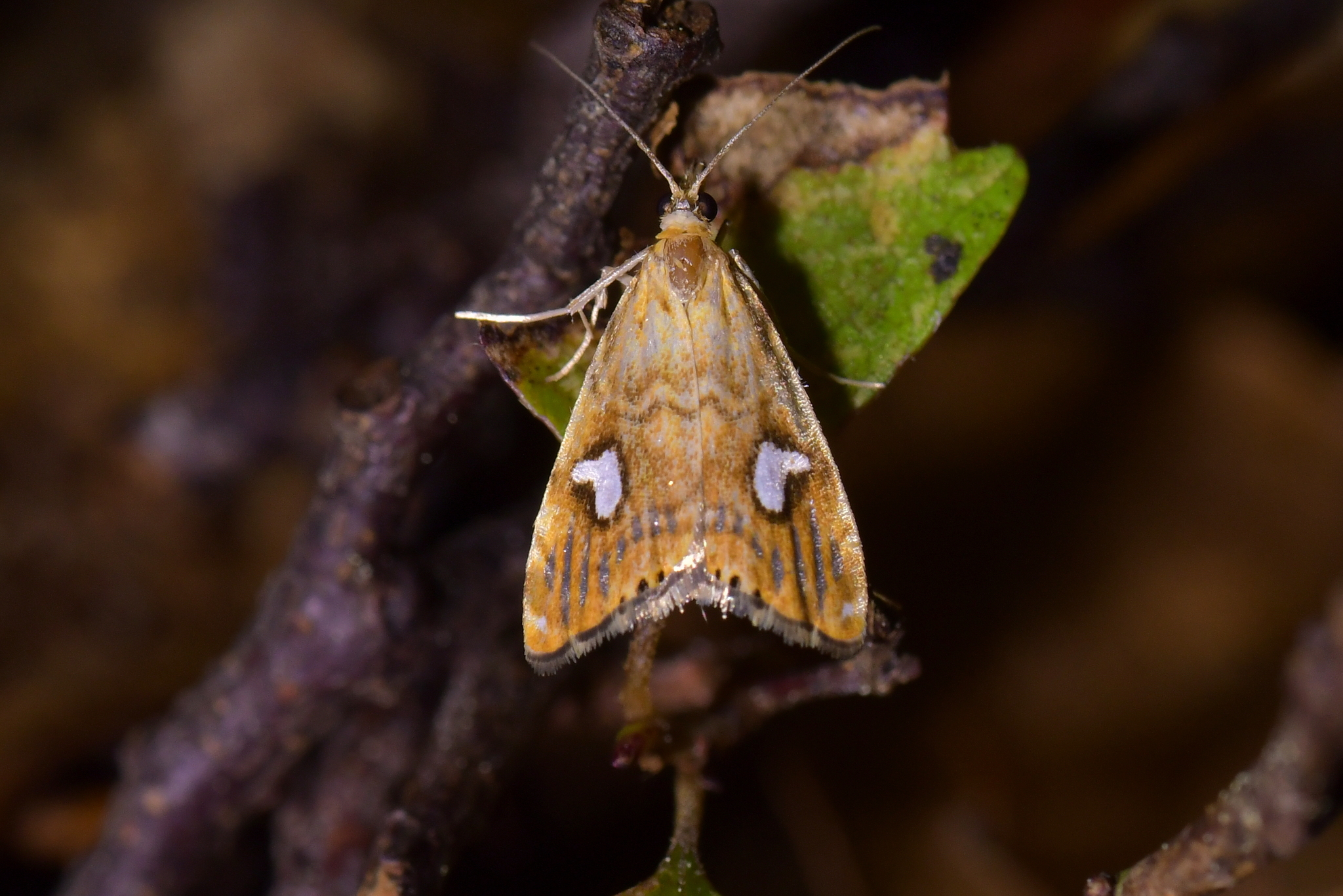
Living G. leucoxantha.

G. leucoxantha inhabits native forest. Hudson stated that he had observed this species in the South Island in native beech forests at elevations of from 1,500 to 2,500 feet above the sea-level. Larvae of Glaucocharis species feed on mosses and liverworts.

== Behaviour ==
Adults are on the wing from November to February. This species rests with the wings drawn backwards and flat forming a triangle; the fore- and intermediate legs are extended and the antennae placed close together along the midback. Hudson pointed out that the rich orange-brown colouring on the forewing resembles that of a faded leaf.
