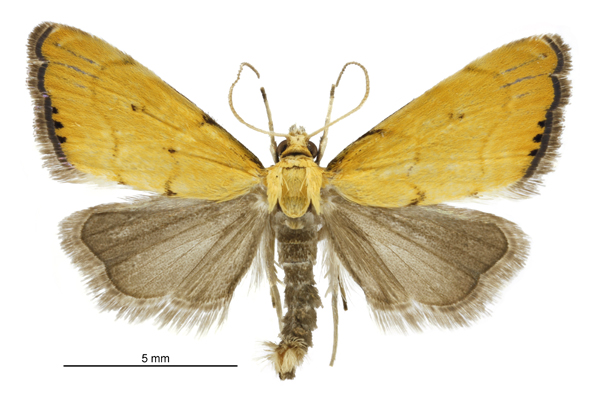
- Male
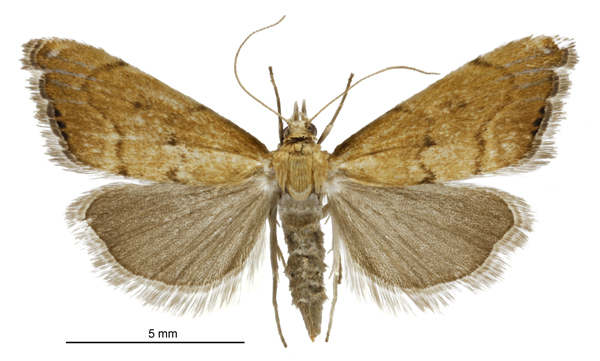
- Female

Scientific classification
- Kingdom: Animalia
- Phylum: Arthropoda
- Clade: Pancrustacea
- Class: Insecta
- Order: Lepidoptera
- Family: Crambidae
- Subfamily: Crambinae
- Tribe: Diptychophorini
- Genus: Glaucocharis
- Species: G. holanthes

Binomial name
- Glaucocharis holanthes (Meyrick, 1885)

Synonyms
- Diptychophora holanthes Meyrick, 1885; Pareromene holanthes (Meyrick, 1885)

= Glaucocharis holanthes =

Species of moth endemic to New Zealand

Glaucocharis holanthes is a moth of the family Crambidae. It was first described by Edward Meyrick in 1885. It is endemic to New Zealand and is found in the North and South Islands. This species inhabits native forest or scrub and frequents rock-faces where moss grows. It is apparently attached to places having an exceptionally heavy rainfall. Larvae of Glaucocharis species feed on mosses and liverworts. Adults are on the wing from November to February. It flies very rapidly in hot sunshine and is an elusive insect to catch.

== Taxonomy ==
This species was first described in 1885 by Edward Meyrick using specimens from Ōtira River collected in January. Meyrick gave a fuller description of this moth later in 1885. George Hudson discussed and illustrated this species under that name in his 1928 book The butterflies and moths of New Zealand. In 1929 Alfred Philpott studied and illustrated the male genitalia of this species. In 1971 David Edward Gaskin placed this species in the genus Pareromene. However in 1985 Gaskin recognised that Glaucocharis must take precedence over Pareromene and placed G. holanthes into that genus. The male lectotype, collected in Ōtira Gorge by Meyrick, is held at the Natural History Museum, London.

== Description ==
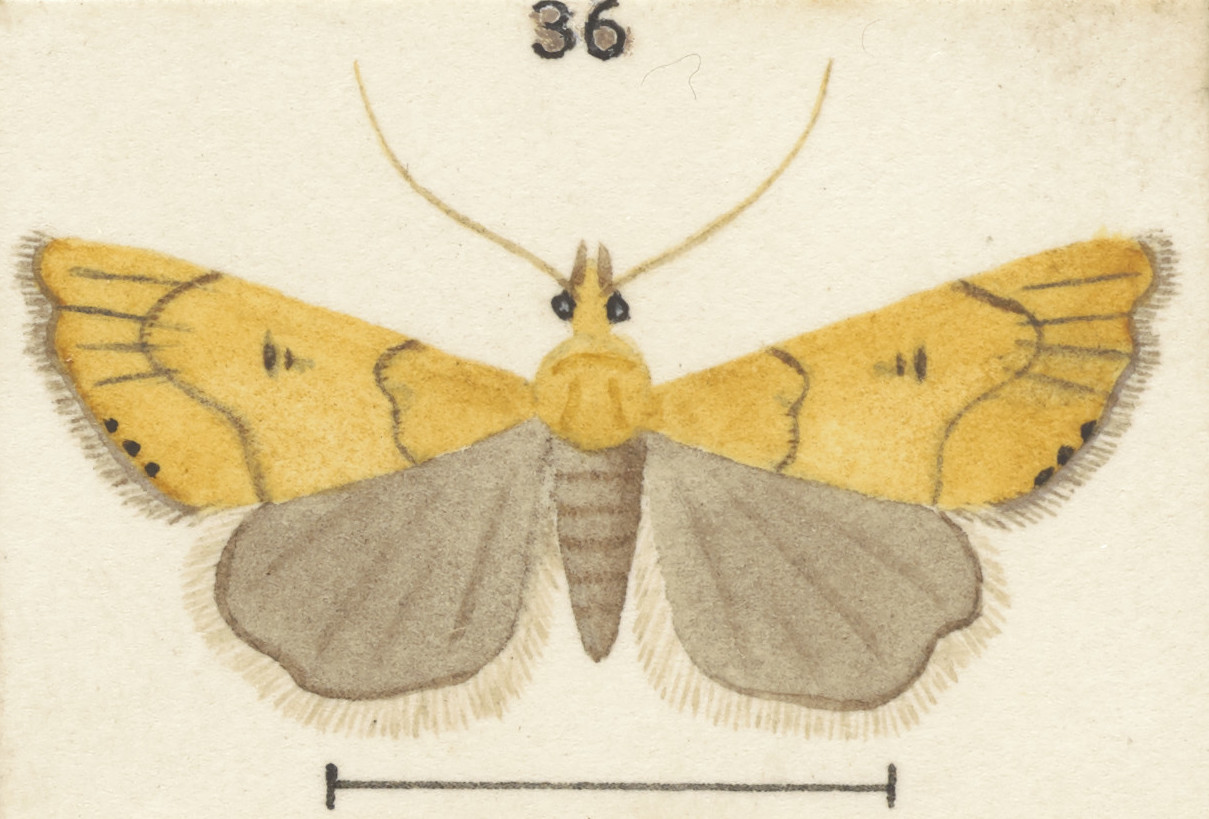
Illustration of female by Hudson.

Meyrick described this species as follows:

Male, female. — 15-17 mm. Head, palpi, and thorax ochreous-yellow, palpi suffused with dark fuscous towards base and apex. Antennas pale greyish-ochreous. Abdomen grey. Legs whitish-grey, posterior tarsi ochreous-whitish. Forewings broad, triangular, costa slightly arched, apex rounded, hindmargin oblique, slightly rounded, twice indented on upper half; bright deep ochreous-yellow; some black scales at base of costa, and one or two in disc towards base; first line very slender, blackish, partially obsolete, from 1/3 of costa to before middle of inner margin, dilated on margins and on a dot in middle, obtusely angulated outwards above middle and inwards below middle; discal spot represented by two blackish dots longitudinally placed; second line very slender, blackish, tolerably distinct, followed by a paler yellow line, from 2/3 of costa to 2/3 of inner margin, upper half strongly curved outwards, lower half nearly straight; three obscure light metallic-grey longitudinal streaks on upper half of wing, extending from before second line to hindmargin; three small quadrate black spots on hindmargin below middle : cilia shining grey, with a darker metallic basal line. Hindwings and cilia grey.

Meyrick stated that this species was distinctive as it has uniformly deep yellow forewings and a double black dot representing the discal spot and has grey hind-wings. Hudson stated that the brown transverse lines are sometimes almost absent and the position of the second line is indicated by a series of short, longitudinal metallic bars. Apart from the very distinct character of the discal spot, this insect might be mistaken for a plain yellow variety of Glaucocharis lepidella.

== Distribution ==
This species is endemic to New Zealand. This species has been observed in the North and South Islands. Hudson stated that this species is very local.

== Habitat and hosts ==
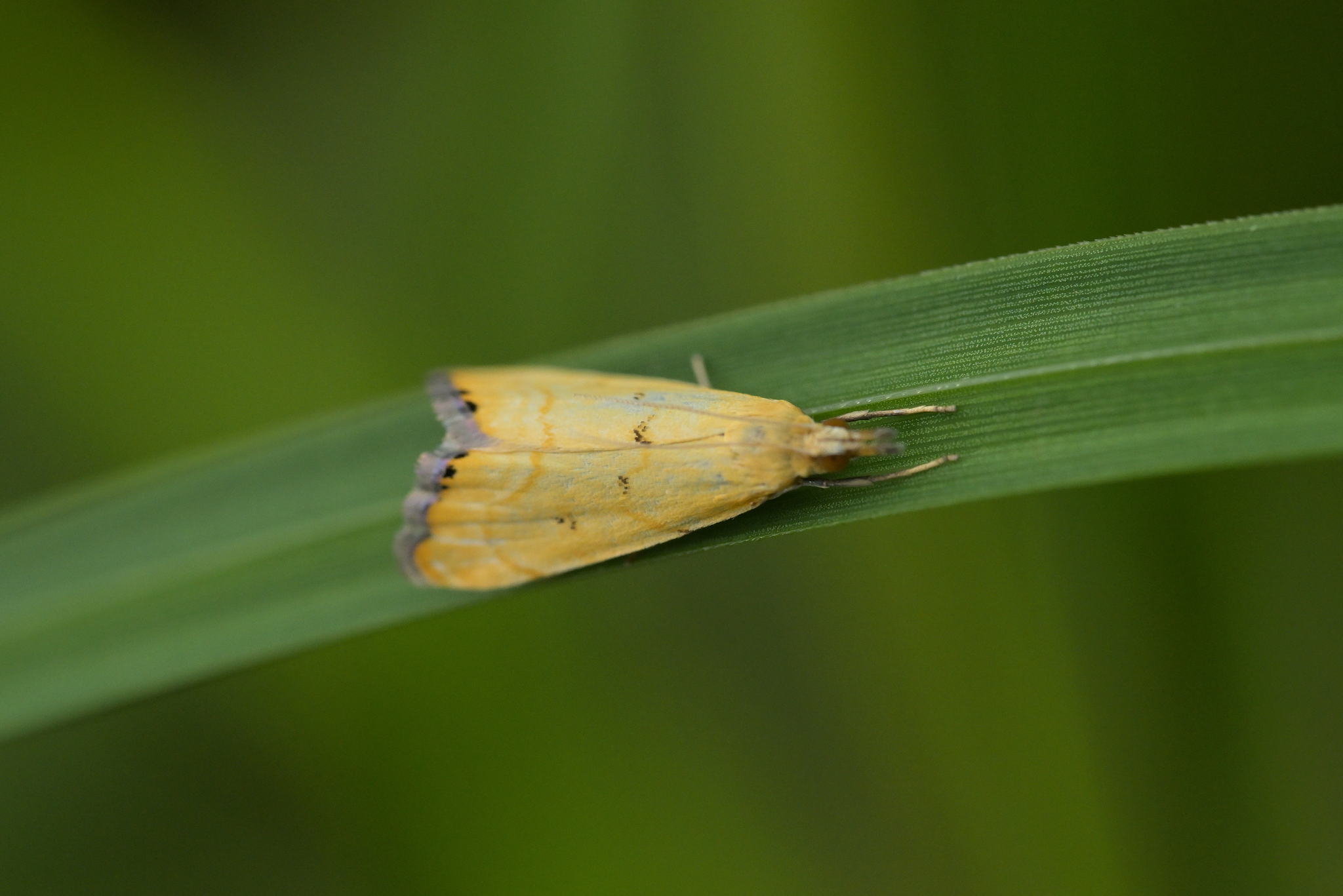
Live specimen of G. holanthes.

This species inhabits native forest or scrub. G. holanthes frequents rock-faces where moss grows. It is apparently attached to places having an exceptionally heavy rainfall. Larvae of Glaucocharis species feed on mosses and liverworts.

== Behaviour ==
Adults are on the wing from November to February. It flies very rapidly in hot sunshine and is an elusive insect to catch.
