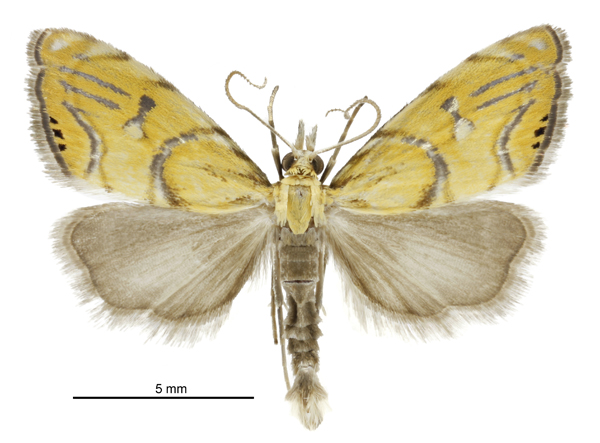

Scientific classification
- Kingdom: Animalia
- Phylum: Arthropoda
- Clade: Pancrustacea
- Class: Insecta
- Order: Lepidoptera
- Family: Crambidae
- Subfamily: Crambinae
- Tribe: Diptychophorini
- Genus: Glaucocharis
- Species: G. auriscriptella

Binomial name
- Glaucocharis auriscriptella (Walker, 1864)

Synonyms
- Eromene auriscriptella Walker, 1864; Diptychophora auriscriptella (Walker, 1864); Pareromene auriscriptella (Walker, 1864)

= Glaucocharis auriscriptella =

Species of moth endemic to New Zealand

Glaucocharis auriscriptella, also known as the yellow silverling or silver marked yellow, is a moth in the family Crambidae. It was first described by Francis Walker in 1864 and is endemic to New Zealand. This species can be found in the North, South, Stewart and Great Barrier Islands. The preferred habitat of this moth is lowland and subalpine native forest as well as wetlands. The larvae feed on moss. The adult moth is day flying and is on the wing from November to February. It can be observed in colonies and can be attracted to light at night. This species likely has only one generation per year.

== Taxonomy ==
It was first described by Francis Walker in 1864 using the name Eromene auriscriptella. In 1882 Edward Meyrick placed this species in the genus Diptychophora. George Hudson discussed and illustrated this species under that name in his 1928 book The butterflies and moths of New Zealand. In 1929 Alfred Philpott studied the male genitalia of this species. In 1971 David Gaskin placed this species in the genus Pareromene. In 1985 Gaskin again discussed this species and placed it in the genus Glaucocharis. In 1988 John S. Dugdale confirmed the placement of this species in the genus Glaucocharis. The male lectotype, collected in Auckland by Daniel Bolton, is held at the Natural History Museum, London.

== Description ==
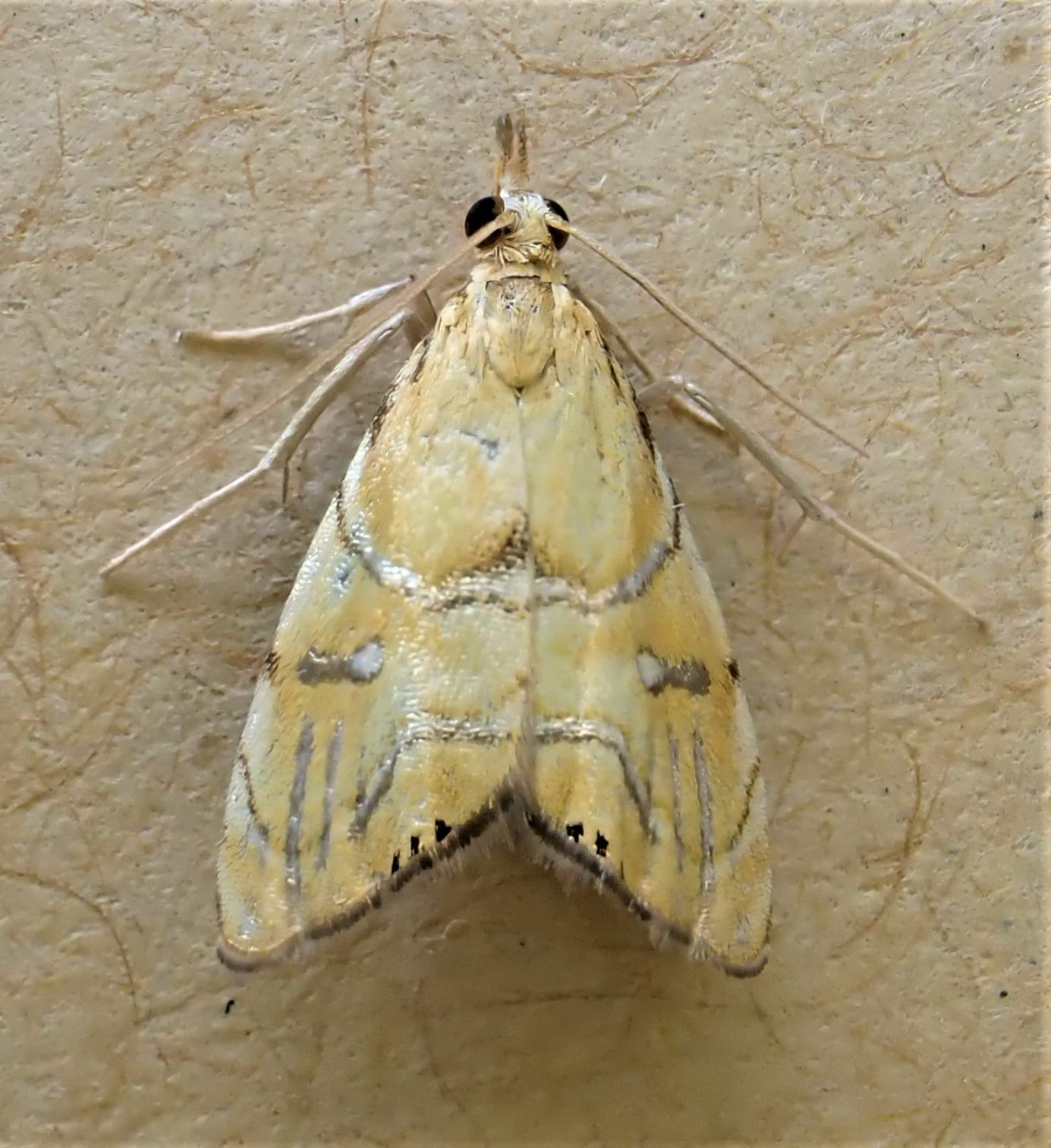
Living specimen.

Hudson described this species as follows:

The expansion of the wings of the male is slightly over 1/2 inch; of the female 5/8 inch. The fore-wings are pale golden yellow, with leaden metallic markings; there is a conspicuous transverse line at about 4, strongly curved towards the termen in the middle; an elongate spot above the middle of the wing, leaden metallic towards the costa and white towards the dorsum; a doubly curved transverse line beyond 3/4 and two long horizontal stripes between the central spot and the termen; the termen is finely edged with bronzy brown; there are three minute black spots just before the tornus. The hind-wings and abdomen are pale grey. The female is slightly darker in general colouring than the male, but the markings are identical in both sexes.

Hudson noted that the transverse lines on some moths may vary in width. Meyrick pointed out that this species is distinguishable from most similar appearing species in its genus by the discal spot on its forewings. For example, the very similar appearing G. holanthes can be distinguished as, unlike G. auriscriptella, the discal spot is represented by two small black dots. The exception is G. chrysochyta which can be distinguished from G. auriscriptella as it is more brightly coloured, and has an indentation on the first transverse line on its forewings.

== Distribution ==
G. auriscriptella is endemic to New Zealand. It has been observed in the North Island, the South Island, on Stewart Island and also on Great Barrier Island.

== Behaviour ==
The adult moth is day flying and is on the wing from November to February. It has been hypothesised that there is one generation per year. This species has been observed as occurring in colonies at the edges of dense native bush. The adults, although day flying, are attracted to light at night.

== Hosts and habitat ==
The larvae feed on mosses. This species inhabits lowland and subalpine native forest and has also been found in wetland habitat. It has been observed on the edge of dense native bush and adults appear to have an affinity for nasturtiums.
