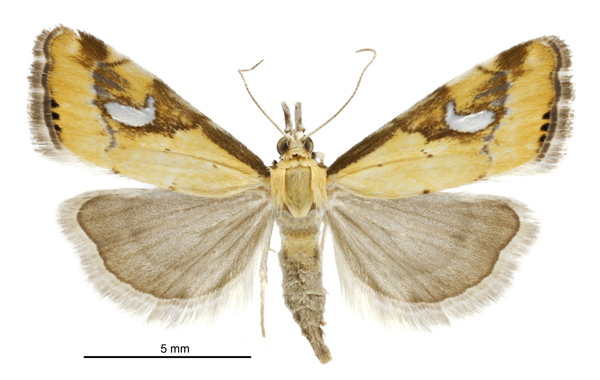

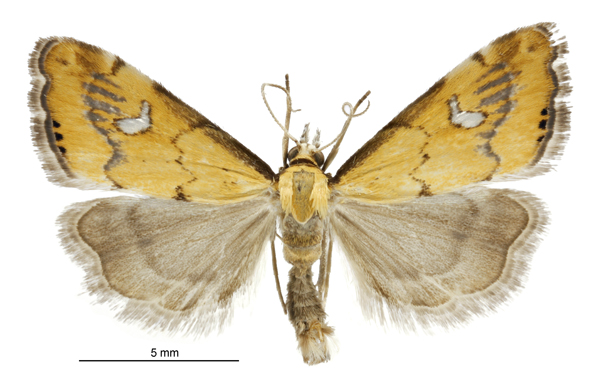
- Female (top) and male (bottom)

Scientific classification
- Kingdom: Animalia
- Phylum: Arthropoda
- Clade: Pancrustacea
- Class: Insecta
- Order: Lepidoptera
- Family: Crambidae
- Subfamily: Crambinae
- Tribe: Diptychophorini
- Genus: Glaucocharis
- Species: G. lepidella

Binomial name
- Glaucocharis lepidella (Walker, 1866)

Synonyms
- Eromene lepidella Walker, 1866; Crambus gracilis C. Felder, R. Felder & Rogenhofer, 1875; Diptychophora lepidella (Walker, 1866); Pareromene lepidella (Walker, 1886)

= Glaucocharis lepidella =

Species of moth

Glaucocharis lepidella is a species of moth in the family Crambidae. It was described by Francis Walker in 1866. It is endemic to New Zealand and is found in both the North and South Island. The species inhabits lowland to subalpine native forest. Larvae may feed on mosses. Adults are on the wing from November to February and are attracted to light.

== Taxonomy ==
This species was first described by Francis Walker in 1866 using a specimen collected by T. R. Oxley in Nelson and named Eromene lepidella. In 1875 Cajetan von Felder, Rudolf Felder and Alois Friedrich Rogenhofer, thinking they were describing a new species, named it Crambus gracilis. In 1882 Edward Meyrick placed this species in the genus Diptychophora. In 1883 Meyrick gave a more detailed description of the specie and synonymised Crambus gracilis into D. lepidella. George Hudson discussed and illustrated this species under this name in his 1928 book The butterflies and moths of New Zealand. In 1929 Alfred Philpott described the genitalia of the male of this species. In 1971 David E. Gaskin placed this species in the genus Pareromene. In 1985 Gaskin again discussed this species and placed it in the genus Glaucocharis. The male lectotype is held at the Natural History Museum, London.

== Description ==
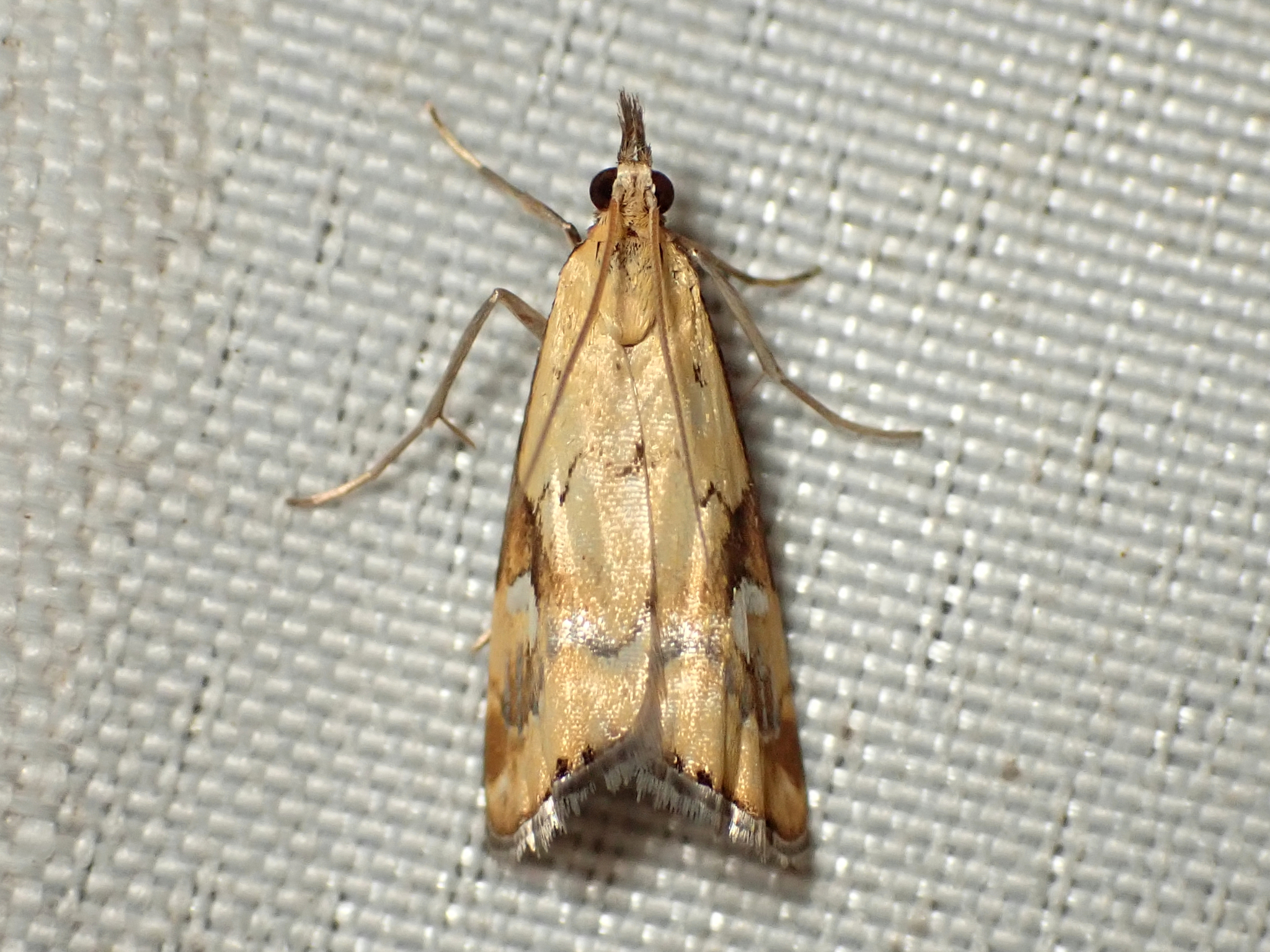
Living specimen.

Meyrick described this species as follows:

Male, female. — 19 1/2-20 1/2 mm. Head, antennae and thorax pale ochreous. Palpi dark fuscous, at base white beneath. Abdomen whitish-grey-ochreous. Legs whitish-ochreous. Forewings triangular, broad, costa slightly arched, apex rounded, hindmargin oblique, sinuations moderate; pale yellowish-ochreous; costa somewhat suffused with brownish towards base; a very slender sometimes indistinct dark fuscous transverse line from costa at 1/3 to inner margin before middle, costal third straight, outwardly oblique, thence irregular, rather strongly bent inwards a little above inner margin; a small longitudinally-placed semicircular silvery-white spot in disc beyond middle, its anterior angle shortly and narrowly produced upwards; a short linear dark fuscous mark along middle of costa; a very slender sometimes indistinct dark fuscous transverse line from costa at 4/5 to inner margin at 4/5, suddenly bent outwards beneath costa, thence moderately outwards-curved, lower third sinuate; sometimes a triangular brown patch on costa immediately beyond first transverse line, extending suffusedly to beneath discal spot; a small suffused brown spot on costa a little beyond second transverse line, sometimes giving rise to a brown suffusion extending to beneath discal spot where it meets the first suffusion, but both these are sometimes wholly obsolete; three short linear longitudinal leaden-metallic streaks crossing second transverse line above middle, and three very short similar streaks below middle; a dark fuscous hindmarginal line; three small roundish black spots close together on hindmargin below middle : cilia shining grey, with a dark metallic-grey basal line.. Hindwings fuscous-grey, with an indistinct darker posterior line, and a dark fuscous hindmarginal line; cilia grey with a faint darker line.

Hudson stated that this species shows considerable variation in the shape and extent of the cloudy patches on its forewings but that the white crescent shaped discal spot is distinctive. Meyrick stated that the discal spot is similar to that found in G. leucoxantha but that G. lepidella could be distinguished from this species as G. lepidella has a duller ground colour and grey hindwings. Meyrick also pointed out that the discal spot helps distinguish G. lepidella from G. auriscriptella as does the larger size of G. lepidella in comparison to that species.

Robert Hoare has stated that

The bright yellow to golden-orange forewing with its crescent-shaped silver spot is characteristic of the species.

== Distribution ==
G. lepidella is endemic to New Zealand and can be found throughout the North and South Islands.

== Habitat and hosts ==
This species inhabits lowland to subalpine native forest. Hudson stated that he came across the species amongst low growing bushes including hebes. It has been hypothesised that the larvae of this species feed on moss.

== Behaviour ==
Adults are on the wing from November to February. The adult moths are attracted to light.
