= List of moths of Australia (Oecophoridae) =

Partial list of Australian moths

This is a list of the moth species of the family Oecophoridae found in Australia. This list acts as an index to the species articles and forms part of the full List of moths of Australia.

== Oecophorinae ==
- Ancistromorpha phryganophanes (Turner, 1946)
- Habroscopa idiocosma (Turner, 1898)
- Habroscopa iriodes (Meyrick, 1883)
- Habroscopa miltotypa (Turner, 1940)
- Hapaloteucha idiosticha (Turner, 1917)
- Hapaloteucha paragramma (Meyrick, 1884)
- Hapaloteucha polemistis (Meyrick, 1902)
- Lamproxantha camptosema (Turner, 1941)
- Lamproxantha zorodes (Turner, 1939)
- Leucorhabda macrosticha (Turner, 1939)
- Leucorhabda rhododactyla (Turner, 1944)
- Orthiastis hyperocha (Meyrick, 1884)
- Polyeucta callimorpha (Lower, 1894)
- Crepidosceles argyropis (Meyrick, 1902)
- Crepidosceles chryserythra (Turner, 1894)
- Crepidosceles coeloxantha (Turner, 1944)
- Crepidosceles exanthema Meyrick, 1885
- Crepidosceles glycydora (Turner, 1917)
- Crepidosceles iostephana Meyrick, 1885
- Crepidosceles leucodetis (Meyrick, 1888)
- Crepidosceles orthomochla (Turner, 1944)
- Crepidosceles proteis (Meyrick, 1888)
- Crepidosceles rhodopechys (Turner, 1946)
- Crepidosceles timalphes (Turner, 1917)
- Lepidotarsa aclea (Meyrick, 1883)
- Lepidotarsa allocota (Turner, 1944)
- Lepidotarsa alphitella Meyrick, 1883
- Lepidotarsa chrysopoca Meyrick, 1883
- Lepidotarsa habrodelta (Lower, 1897)
- Lepidotarsa maculopa (Lower, 1903)
- Lepidotarsa nicetes Turner, 1946
- Lepidotarsa pentascia Turner, 1917
- Ageletha crocoxantha (Meyrick, 1888)
- Ageletha elaeodes (Meyrick, 1883)
- Ageletha hemiteles (Meyrick, 1883)
- Anthocoma euterpnes Turner, 1946
- Brachynemata aphanes (Meyrick, 1884)
- Brachynemata cingulata Meyrick, 1885
- Brachynemata diantha (Meyrick, 1913)
- Brachynemata epiphragma (Meyrick, 1888)
- Brachynemata ichneuta (Meyrick, 1888)
- Brachynemata leucanepsia (Turner, 1940)
- Brachynemata mimopa (Meyrick, 1902)
- Brachynemata ochrolitha (Lower, 1903)
- Brachynemata ombrodes (Lower, 1897)
- Brachynemata restricta (Meyrick, 1920)
- Coeranica eritima Meyrick, 1884
- Coeranica isabella (Newman, 1856)
- Coeranica rhythmosema (Turner, 1940)
- Cosmaresta anarrecta (Meyrick, 1889)
- Cosmaresta anomophanes (Turner, 1927)
- Cosmaresta archedora (Turner, 1944)
- Cosmaresta callichrysa (Lower, 1898)
- Cosmaresta canephora (Meyrick, 1883)
- Cosmaresta charaxias (Meyrick, 1889)
- Cosmaresta eugramma (Lower, 1894)
- Cosmaresta eurytoxa (Turner, 1944)
- Cosmaresta hyphanta (Turner, 1927)
- Cosmaresta leucozancla (Turner, 1944)
- Cosmaresta niphias (Meyrick, 1884)
- Cosmaresta ochrophara (Turner, 1938)
- Cosmaresta phaeochorda (Turner, 1927)
- Elaphromorpha asthenes (Turner, 1944)
- Elaphromorpha axierasta (Turner, 1916)
- Elaphromorpha euneta (Turner, 1940)
- Elaphromorpha glycymilicha Turner, 1936
- Eochrois acutella (Walker, 1864)
- Eochrois aetopis (Meyrick, 1889)
- Eochrois anaemica (Turner, 1916)
- Eochrois anthophora (Turner, 1944)
- Eochrois argyraspis (Lower, 1897)
- Eochrois atypa (Turner, 1946)
- Eochrois callianassa (Meyrick, 1883)
- Eochrois caminias (Meyrick, 1889)
- Eochrois chrysias (Lower, 1901)
- Eochrois cuphosema (Turner, 1946)
- Eochrois cycnodes (Meyrick, 1889)
- Eochrois dejunctella (Walker, 1864)
- Eochrois ebenosticha (Turner, 1917)
- Eochrois epidesma (Meyrick, 1886)
- Eochrois epitoxa (Meyrick, 1889)
- Eochrois hebes (Turner, 1946)
- Eochrois holarga (Turner, 1936)
- Eochrois holochra (Turner, 1946)
- Eochrois leiochroa Lower, 1907
- Eochrois leucocrossa (Meyrick, 1889)
- Eochrois malacopis (Meyrick, 1889)
- Eochrois monophaes (Meyrick, 1884)
- Eochrois pandora (Turner, 1917)
- Eochrois phoenopis (Turner, 1940)
- Eochrois platyphaea (Turner, 1939)
- Eochrois pulverulenta (Meyrick, 1883)
- Eochrois rubrilinea (Turner, 1947)
- Eochrois sarcoxantha (Lower, 1893)
- Heteroteucha anthodora (Meyrick, 1884)
- Heteroteucha asema (Turner, 1917)
- Heteroteucha aspasia (Meyrick, 1884)
- Heteroteucha dichroella (Zeller, 1877)
- Heteroteucha dimochla (Turner, 1944)
- Heteroteucha distephana (Meyrick, 1884)
- Heteroteucha epistrepta (Turner, 1940)
- Heteroteucha initiata (Meyrick, 1920)
- Heteroteucha kershawi (Lower, 1893)
- Heteroteucha leptobaphes (Turner, 1944)
- Heteroteucha occidua (Meyrick, 1884)
- Heteroteucha ophthalmica (Meyrick, 1884)
- Heteroteucha paraclista (Meyrick, 1913)
- Heteroteucha parvula (Meyrick, 1884)
- Heteroteucha porphyryplaca (Lower, 1893)
- Heteroteucha rhoecosema (Turner, 1941)
- Heteroteucha rhoecozona (Turner, 1946)
- Heteroteucha stereomita (Turner, 1944)
- Heteroteucha subflava (Turner, 1944)
- Heteroteucha translatella (Walker, 1864)
- Heteroteucha tritoxantha (Meyrick, 1886)
- Heteroteucha xanthisma (Turner, 1917)
- Lophopepla argyrocarpa Meyrick, 1914
- Lophopepla asteropa (Lower, 1900)
- Lophopepla igniferella (Walker, 1864)
- Lophopepla triselena (Lower, 1902)
- Piloprepes aemulella (Walker, 1864)
- Piloprepes anassa Meyrick, 1889
- Piloprepes anguicula Meyrick, 1913
- Piloprepes antidoxa Meyrick, 1889
- Piloprepes aristocratica Meyrick, 1889
- Piloprepes gelidella (Walker, 1864)
- Piloprepes glaucaspis Turner, 1896
- Piloprepes perinephela (Turner, 1935)
- Piloprepes polynephela (Turner, 1935)
- Plectobela amphidyas (Meyrick, 1888)
- Plectobela annularis (Meyrick, 1884)
- Plectobela catalampra (Meyrick, 1884)
- Plectobela ecliptica (Meyrick, 1884)
- Plectobela ocellaris (Meyrick, 1884)
- Plectobela personata (Meyrick, 1884)
- Plectobela stereosema (Meyrick, 1889)
- Plectobela zanclotoma (Meyrick, 1884)
- Poliorhabda auriceps (Butler, 1882)
- Poliorhabda chrysoptera (Turner, 1940)
- Poliorhabda cnecopasta (Turner, 1941)
- Poliorhabda phoenopasta (Turner, 1927)
- Psaroxantha basilica (Meyrick, 1884)
- Psaroxantha calligenes (Meyrick, 1886)
- Psaroxantha calliphylla (Turner, 1917)
- Psaroxantha epiplasta (Turner, 1917)
- Psaroxantha euryzona (Turner, 1917)
- Psaroxantha euzona (Turner, 1941)
- Psaroxantha miltozona (Lower, 1901)
- Psaroxantha polyzona (Turner, 1940)
- Psaroxantha tricoronata (Meyrick, 1920)
- Pycnozancla acribes (Turner, 1894)
- Pycnozancla epiprepes (Turner, 1894)
- Pycnozancla erythrodes Turner, 1917
- Rhadinoloba euerata (Turner, 1940)
- Rhadinoloba periculosa (Meyrick, 1913)
- Rhadinoloba tyrianthina (Turner, 1940)
- Saphezona pholidoxantha Common, 1994
- Stictochila delosticta (Turner, 1946)
- Stictochila metata (Meyrick, 1914)
- Stictochila myriospila (Lower, 1903)
- Stictochila sarcoptera (Lower, 1897)
- Tanyzancla acutella (Walker, 1864)
- Tanyzancla amphitoxa (Meyrick, 1889)
- Tanyzancla argutella (Zeller, 1877)
- Tanyzancla atricollis (Meyrick, 1884)
- Tanyzancla calliophthalma (Meyrick, 1889)
- Tanyzancla marionella (Newman, 1856)
- Tanyzancla melanocrossa (Meyrick, 1889)
- Tanyzancla phaedropa (Lower, 1901)
- Zonopetala alypa (Turner, 1914)
- Zonopetala clerota Meyrick, 1883
- Zonopetala correcta Meyrick, 1915
- Zonopetala decisana (Walker, 1863)
- Zonopetala divisella (Walker, 1864)
- Zonopetala glauconephela Meyrick, 1883
- Zonopetala melanoma Meyrick, 1883
- Zonopetala propria Turner, 1946
- Zonopetala quadripustulella (Walker, 1864)
- Zonopetala synarthra Meyrick, 1886
- Zonopetala viscata Meyrick, 1914
- Zonopetala zygophora Lower, 1894
- Eremnotypa fusiplaga (Turner, 1917)
- Eremnotypa steriphota (Meyrick, 1914)
- Euphiltra angustior Turner, 1894
- Euphiltra celeteria Turner, 1917
- Euphiltra chrysorrhoda Meyrick, 1902
- Euphiltra epilecta Turner, 1917
- Euphiltra eroticella Meyrick, 1883
- Euphiltra tricensa Meyrick, 1918
- Euthictis xanthodelta (Meyrick, 1889)
- Hoplomorpha abalienella (Walker, 1864)
- Hoplomorpha camelaea (Meyrick, 1888)
- Hoplomorpha caminodes Turner, 1916
- Hoplomorpha epicosma Turner, 1916
- Hoplomorpha notatana (Walker, 1863)
- Hoplomorpha teratopa (Meyrick, 1920)
- Placocosma agaclita (Meyrick, 1884)
- Placocosma gemmaria (Meyrick, 1921)
- Placocosma hemiphaes (Turner, 1917)
- Placocosma hephaestea Meyrick, 1883
- Placocosma resumptella (Walker, 1864)
- Scotodryas alopecistis (Meyrick, 1889)
- Scotodryas holocausta Turner, 1932
- Scotodryas lechriosema (Turner, 1919)
- Scotodryas lividella (Meyrick, 1883)
- Ironopolia ebenosticta (Turner, 1946)
- Ironopolia neochlora (Meyrick, 1883)
- Ironopolia sobriella (Walker, 1864)
- Ironopolia stygnodes (Turner, 1946)
- Prodelaca achalinella (Meyrick, 1883)
- Prodelaca biseriata (Meyrick, 1920)
- Prodelaca eocrossa (Meyrick, 1888)
- Prodelaca leptochroma (Turner, 1937)
- Prodelaca limata (Meyrick, 1914)
- Prodelaca micropasta (Turner, 1944)
- Prodelaca myodes (Meyrick, 1883)
- Prodelaca puellaris (Meyrick, 1883)
- Basiplecta argyrodes (Turner, 1917)
- Basiplecta plagiosticha (Turner, 1916)
- Idiozancla pycnosticha Turner, 1936
- Limothnes leucotoma Turner, 1935
- Limothnes phaeodesma (Meyrick, 1913)
- Limothnes plicilinea (Turner, 1935)
- Linosticha chrysoloma Lower, 1893
- Linosticha cyclophragma Meyrick, 1889
- Linosticha epixesta Meyrick, 1889
- Linosticha helictis Meyrick, 1889
- Linosticha monozona Meyrick, 1889
- Linosticha orthogramma (Meyrick, 1884)
- Linosticha phaeoxysta (Turner, 1936)
- Linosticha scythropa Meyrick, 1883
- Psaltriodes thriambis Meyrick, 1902
- Acmotoma magniferella (Walker, 1864)
- Arachnographa mesophthora (Meyrick, 1886)
- Arachnographa micrastrella (Meyrick, 1883)
- Baiocystis chrysoides (Turner, 1917)
- Baiocystis coniortia (Meyrick, 1884)
- Echinobasis halata (Meyrick, 1913)
- Echinobasis lactipalpis (Meyrick, 1920)
- Echinobasis semifulva (Turner, 1944)
- Epicurica laetiferanus (Walker, 1863)
- Epicurica mutabilis (Turner, 1939)
- Liocnema crypsirrhoda (Turner, 1939)
- Paneutricha hypertricha (Turner, 1927)
- Parocystola eubrocha (Turner, 1946)
- Parocystola leucospora Turner, 1896
- Phytotrypa anachorda (Meyrick, 1884)
- Phytotrypa anazancla (Meyrick, 1889)
- Phytotrypa brochosema (Meyrick, 1884)
- Phytotrypa erythrotaenia (Wallengren, 1861)
- Phytotrypa platyptera (Lower, 1893)
- Phytotrypa pretiosella (Walker, 1863)
- Phytotrypa propriella (Walker, 1864)
- Acorotricha crystanta Meyrick, 1913
- Acorotricha trichophora (Turner, 1917)
- Callimima daedalma Turner, 1935
- Callimima lophoptera (Lower, 1894)
- Heteroptolis leucosta (Lower, 1892)
- Hybocrossa paratypa Turner, 1917
- Trachyzancla histrica Turner, 1917
- Deigmoesta lithocosma (Meyrick, 1886)
- Tortricopsis aulacois Meyrick, 1883
- Tortricopsis crocopepla Turner, 1946
- Tortricopsis euryphanella (Meyrick, 1883)
- Tortricopsis hesychaea (Meyrick, 1886)
- Tortricopsis pyroptis Meyrick, 1902
- Tortricopsis semijunctella Walker, 1864
- Tortricopsis uncinella (Zeller, 1854)
- Wingia aurata (Walker, 1864)
- Wingia hesperidella (Meyrick, 1883)
- Wingia lambertella (Wing, 1850)
- Wingia psittacodes (Turner, 1917)
- Wingia rectiorella (Walker, 1864)
- Wingia subrosea (Turner, 1894)
- Wingia thalamia (Meyrick, 1883)
- Wingia theophila (Meyrick, 1886)
- Acanthodela erythrosema (Meyrick, 1886)
- Acanthodela protophaes (Meyrick, 1883)
- Ericibdela delotis (Meyrick, 1888)
- Platyphylla zophosphena Turner, 1946
- Ptyoptila matutinella (Walker, 1864)
- Archaereta dorsivittella (Walker, 1863)
- Enoplidia simplex (Turner, 1896)
- Enoplidia stenomorpha (Turner, 1946)
- Euchaetis coccoscela (Turner, 1946)
- Euchaetis crypsichroa Lower, 1893
- Euchaetis cryptorrhoda (Turner, 1946)
- Euchaetis endoleuca Meyrick, 1888
- Euchaetis euspilomela (Lower, 1893)
- Euchaetis habrocosma Meyrick, 1883
- Euchaetis holoclera Meyrick, 1888
- Euchaetis incarnatella (Walker, 1864)
- Euchaetis inceptella (Walker, 1864)
- Euchaetis inclusella (Walker, 1864)
- Euchaetis insana (Meyrick, 1921)
- Euchaetis iospila Meyrick, 1888
- Euchaetis iozona (Lower, 1893)
- Euchaetis metallota Meyrick, 1883
- Euchaetis parthenopa (Meyrick, 1883)
- Euchaetis poliarcha Meyrick, 1888
- Euchaetis rhizobola Meyrick, 1888
- Euchaetis rhodochila (Turner, 1946)
- Euchaetis rufogrisea (Meyrick, 1883)
- Heliocausta floridula Meyrick, 1913
- Heliocausta oecophorella (Walker, 1864)
- Heliocausta sarcodes Turner, 1917
- Prionocris acmaea (Meyrick, 1888)
- Prionocris charodes (Lower, 1920)
- Prionocris complanula (Turner, 1896)
- Prionocris mollis (Turner, 1946)
- Prionocris phylacopis (Meyrick, 1888)
- Prionocris protoxantha (Meyrick, 1883)
- Prionocris rhodopepla (Lower, 1903)
- Syringoseca mimica (Meyrick, 1888)
- Syringoseca rhodoxantha (Meyrick, 1888)
- Antipterna acrobaphes (Meyrick, 1885)
- Antipterna assulosa (Turner, 1940)
- Antipterna diclethra (Meyrick, 1885)
- Antipterna diplosticta (Turner, 1944)
- Antipterna euanthes (Meyrick, 1885)
- Antipterna glacialis (Meyrick, 1885)
- Antipterna hemimelas (Turner, 1940)
- Antipterna homoleuca (Meyrick, 1885)
- Antipterna homopasta (Turner, 1932)
- Antipterna lithophanes (Meyrick, 1885)
- Antipterna microphanes (Lower, 1902)
- Antipterna monostropha (Meyrick, 1885)
- Antipterna naias (Meyrick, 1902)
- Antipterna nivea (Turner, 1940)
- Antipterna panarga (Turner, 1932)
- Antipterna ptychomochla Turner, 1940
- Antipterna spathulata (Turner, 1944)
- Antipterna stichoptis (Lower, 1915)
- Antipterna tephrodes (Lower, 1902)
- Antipterna trilicella (Meyrick, 1885)
- Atelosticha phaedrella Meyrick, 1883
- Bathrosterra calotropha (Meyrick, 1883)
- Bathrosterra gypsoplaca (Turner, 1944)
- Bathrosterra macrotricha (Turner, 1917)
- Catacometes hemiscia (Meyrick, 1883)
- Catacometes phanozona (Turner, 1896)
- Chrysonoma acnissa (Turner, 1940)
- Chrysonoma bullifera Meyrick, 1920
- Chrysonoma catoptrina (Meyrick, 1884)
- Chrysonoma concisella (Walker, 1864)
- Chrysonoma consularis (Meyrick, 1913)
- Chrysonoma deltosema (Meyrick, 1884)
- Chrysonoma drepanephora (Turner, 1944)
- Chrysonoma epularis (Meyrick, 1913)
- Chrysonoma euchrysa (Lower, 1894)
- Chrysonoma fascialis (Fabricius, 1775)
- Chrysonoma gilvella (Turner, 1917)
- Chrysonoma habropis (Lower, 1897)
- Chrysonoma ioplaca (Turner, 1944)
- Chrysonoma iphia (Turner, 1940)
- Chrysonoma isosceliphora (Lower, 1894)
- Chrysonoma macropodias (Meyrick, 1913)
- Chrysonoma megaloxantha (Turner, 1917)
- Chrysonoma menodora (Meyrick, 1889)
- Chrysonoma panxantha (Lower, 1894)
- Chrysonoma paracycla (Meyrick, 1884)
- Chrysonoma seleniaca (Meyrick, 1884)
- Chrysonoma tentatella (Walker, 1864)
- Chrysonoma toxeres (Turner, 1944)
- Chrysonoma trigonocosma (Turner, 1941)
- Chrysonoma xuthoterma (Meyrick, 1920)
- Chrysonoma zanclotypa (Turner, 1917)
- Compsotropha charidotis Meyrick, 1884
- Compsotropha selenias Meyrick, 1884
- Compsotropha strophiella Meyrick, 1884
- Coryphoscola dictyosema (Turner, 1946)
- Diaphorodes tephrastis (Turner, 1917)
- Endeolena aurinatella (Walker, 1864)
- Endeolena xanthiella (Walker, 1864)
- Garrha absumptella (Walker, 1864)
- Garrha achroa (Turner, 1896)
- Garrha acosmeta (Turner, 1896)
- Garrha agglomerata (Meyrick, 1920)
- Garrha alma (Meyrick, 1914)
- Garrha amata (Meyrick, 1914)
- Garrha arrhodea (Turner, 1917)
- Garrha atoecha (Meyrick, 1886)
- Garrha atripunctatella (Turner, 1896)
- Garrha brachytricha (Turner, 1927)
- Garrha carnea (Zeller, 1855)
- Garrha cholodella (Meyrick, 1883)
- Garrha coccinea (Turner, 1917)
- Garrha costimacula (Meyrick, 1883)
- Garrha cylicotypa (Turner, 1946)
- Garrha defessa (Meyrick, 1920)
- Garrha demotica (Meyrick, 1883)
- Garrha eugramma (Lower, 1894)
- Garrha gypsopyga (Meyrick, 1914)
- Garrha icasta (Turner, 1941)
- Garrha idiosema (Turner, 1917)
- Garrha interjecta (Turner, 1946)
- Garrha leucerythra (Meyrick, 1883)
- Garrha limbata (Meyrick, 1883)
- Garrha mellichroa (Lower, 1897)
- Garrha mesodesma (Meyrick, 1889)
- Garrha mesogaea (Turner, 1916)
- Garrha metriopis (Meyrick, 1888)
- Garrha micromita (Turner, 1946)
- Garrha miltopsara (Turner, 1914)
- Garrha mitescens (Meyrick, 1914)
- Garrha moderatella (Walker, 1864)
- Garrha ocellifera (Meyrick, 1883)
- Garrha ochra (Turner, 1946)
- Garrha oncospila (Turner, 1946)
- Garrha paraderces (Meyrick, 1889)
- Garrha phaeoporphyra (Turner, 1939)
- Garrha phoenopis (Turner, 1916)
- Garrha platyporphyra (Turner, 1946)
- Garrha pseudota (Lower, 1901)
- Garrha pudica (Zeller, 1855)
- Garrha pyrrhopasta (Turner, 1946)
- Garrha repandula (Zeller, 1855)
- Garrha rubella (Turner, 1939)
- Garrha rufa (Meyrick, 1883)
- Garrha rufescens (Turner, 1946)
- Garrha rufimaculella (Turner, 1896)
- Garrha sericata (Meyrick, 1883)
- Garrha sincerella Walker, 1866
- Garrha spatiosa (Meyrick, 1921)
- Garrha submissa (Turner, 1946)
- Garrha umbratica (Turner, 1946)
- Garrha zonostola (Meyrick, 1884)
- Hadrocheta syncarpica Common, 1994
- Hemibela actinodes (Turner, 1940)
- Hemibela bacchias (Meyrick, 1913)
- Hemibela callista (Meyrick, 1885)
- Hemibela gnomica (Meyrick, 1885)
- Hemibela heliotricha (Lower, 1904)
- Hemibela hemicalypta (Meyrick, 1885)
- Hemibela oxyptera (Lower, 1894)
- Hemibela platyxantha (Lower, 1907)
- Hemibela pyrochrysa (Meyrick, 1889)
- Hemibela spumifera (Turner, 1936)
- Hemibela thymodes (Meyrick, 1885)
- Hemibela trigonoptera (Turner, 1940)
- Hemibela tyranna (Meyrick, 1885)
- Idioxantha anthina (Turner, 1947)
- Mionolena dolopis (Turner, 1941)
- Mionolena euxantha (Meyrick, 1884)
- Mionolena pleurophaea (Turner, 1940)
- Myrascia bracteatella (Walker, 1864)
- Myrascia chionora Common, 1977
- Myrascia cremantis (Meyrick, 1889)
- Myrascia empheres Common, 1977
- Myrascia interlineatella (Walker, 1864)
- Myrascia lathicentra (Meyrick, 1889)
- Myrascia megalocentra (Meyrick, 1889)
- Myrascia melitypa Common, 1977
- Myrascia mychias (Meyrick, 1889)
- Myrascia racinora Common, 1977
- Myrascia subductella (Walker, 1864)
- Myrascia trijugella (Zeller, 1877)
- Ocystola chionea Meyrick, 1885
- Ocystola crystallina Meyrick, 1885
- Ocystola holonota Meyrick, 1889
- Ocystola paulinella (Newman, 1856)
- Ocystola pyramis Meyrick, 1885
- Ocystola spectabilis (Turner, 1896)
- Oligoloba severa (Meyrick, 1883)
- Phyllophanes dyseureta Turner, 1896
- Sclerocheta phyocera Common, 1994
- Stereoloba diphracta (Lower, 1920)
- Stereoloba melanoplecta (Turner, 1917)
- Stereoloba promiscua (Meyrick, 1922)
- Thalerotricha mylicella Meyrick, 1884
- Zacorus albescens (Turner, 1944)
- Zacorus anomodes (Meyrick, 1889)
- Zacorus aparthena (Meyrick, 1884)
- Zacorus carus Butler, 1882
- Zacorus melanocentra (Meyrick, 1889)
- Zacorus montivaga (Turner, 1939)
- Zacorus pura (Meyrick, 1884)
- Zelotechna falcifera (Meyrick, 1883)
- Zelotechna hirax (Meyrick, 1883)
- Zelotechna sigmastropha (Lower, 1898)
- Phauloplana illuta (Meyrick, 1885)
- Phauloplana xiphomorpha (Turner, 1940)
- Pseudotheta syrtica (Meyrick, 1902)
- Phauloglossa aspila Common, 1997
- Phauloglossa palleuca Common, 1997
- Brachyzancla acerasia (Turner, 1940)
- Brachyzancla cretosa Turner, 1936
- Brachyzancla lissodes Turner, 1936
- Allognoma psephena (Meyrick, 1884)
- Enchronista proximella (Walker, 1863)
- Phloeograptis macrynta Meyrick, 1904
- Phloeograptis obliquata (Lucas, 1900)
- Phloeograptis pachnias (Meyrick, 1902)
- Phloeograptis spodopasta (Lower, 1920)
- Phloeograptis zopherota Meyrick, 1904
- Proteromicta crymorrhoa Meyrick, 1889
- Proteromicta spodostrota (Meyrick, 1902)
- Ptochosaris brachyota (Meyrick, 1889)
- Ptochosaris horrenda Meyrick, 1906
- Heterozyga coppatias Meyrick, 1885
- Aeolothapsa acrocosma (Turner, 1917)
- Aeolothapsa agelaea (Meyrick, 1885)
- Aeolothapsa isarithma (Meyrick, 1885)
- Aeolothapsa malacella (Meyrick, 1885)
- Aeolothapsa tanythrix (Turner, 1914)
- Aeolothapsa xantholoma (Turner, 1917)
- Artiastis heliacma Meyrick, 1889
- Artiastis philoscia (Meyrick, 1902)
- Artiastis ptochopa Meyrick, 1889
- Artiastis stenopolia (Turner, 1936)
- Artiastis tepida Meyrick, 1889
- Atholosticta chalcoteucta (Turner, 1933)
- Atholosticta oxypeuces (Turner, 1927)
- Boroscena phaulopis Turner, 1917
- Coesyra cyclotoma Meyrick, 1884
- Coesyra mediocris Turner, 1941
- Conobrosis acervata (Meyrick, 1914)
- Conobrosis haplochroma Common, 1997
- Cryptotypa ephalta (Meyrick, 1915)
- Cryptotypa filifera (Turner, 1936)
- Cryptotypa textilis (Meyrick, 1906)
- Disselia aleurota Meyrick, 1886
- Disselia iulophylla (Turner, 1933)
- Drepanocera galbanea (Meyrick, 1913)
- Drepanocera microstigmata (Turner, 1944)
- Drepanocera torpens (Meyrick, 1920)
- Erythrisa oenoessa Turner, 1938
- Hesperoptila arida Meyrick, 1902
- Hesperoptila capnopleura (Turner, 1936)
- Hesperoptila lasiocephala (Lower, 1916)
- Hesperoptila poliochroa (Turner, 1898)
- Hesperoptila semidalota (Turner, 1936)
- Ioptera aristogona Meyrick, 1883
- Ioptera demica Meyrick, 1889
- Oxythecta acceptella (Walker, 1864)
- Oxythecta alternella (Walker, 1864)
- Oxythecta gypsomera (Lower, 1920)
- Oxythecta hieroglyphica Meyrick, 1885
- Oxythecta loxomochla Turner, 1940
- Oxythecta lygrosema Meyrick, 1885
- Oxythecta nephelonota Meyrick, 1885
- Oxythecta neurota (Meyrick, 1885)
- Oxythecta zonoteles Meyrick, 1885
- Pararsia marmorea (Lower, 1897)
- Pelinoema pudica (Lower, 1900)
- Pelinoema xipholeuca (Lower, 1901)
- Periorycta eucraera (Turner, 1917)
- Phloeocetis euthemon (Turner, 1936)
- Phloeocetis leucospila (Meyrick, 1920)
- Phloeocetis pissogramma (Turner, 1940)
- Phloeocetis plagiospila (Lower, 1920)
- Phloeocetis polycapna (Turner, 1917)
- Phloeocetis psilostola (Meyrick, 1889)
- Phloeocetis symmicta (Turner, 1936)
- Phloeocetis virgea Turner, 1936
- Pycnocera hypoxantha Turner, 1896
- Scatochresis anadesma (Meyrick, 1889)
- Scatochresis episema (Meyrick, 1883)
- Scatochresis innumera (Meyrick, 1889)
- Scatochresis perigrapta (Turner, 1933)
- Stictopolia cretea (Turner, 1940)
- Tachystola acroxantha (Meyrick, 1885)
- Tachystola alphitopis (Turner, 1944)
- Tachystola anthera (Meyrick, 1885)
- Tachystola cerochyta (Turner, 1939)
- Tachystola enoplia (Meyrick, 1885)
- Tachystola hemisema (Meyrick, 1885)
- Tachystola oxytora (Meyrick, 1885)
- Tachystola phaeopyra (Turner, 1927)
- Tachystola ptochodes (Turner, 1917)
- Tachystola sidonia (Meyrick, 1913)
- Tachystola stenoptera (Meyrick, 1884)
- Tachystola thiasotis (Meyrick, 1885)
- Telanepsia astatopis (Turner, 1933)
- Telanepsia coprobora Common & Horak, 1994
- Telanepsia eucentra (Turner, 1927)
- Telanepsia idiospila (Turner, 1933)
- Telanepsia mobilis (Meyrick, 1915)
- Telanepsia niphadia (Meyrick, 1886)
- Telanepsia nonymopis (Turner, 1933)
- Telanepsia notospila (Turner, 1933)
- Telanepsia oricalla Turner, 1933
- Telanepsia scatophila Common & Horak, 1994
- Telanepsia stenophanes (Turner, 1933)
- Telanepsia stictocrossa (Turner, 1939)
- Telanepsia stockeri Common & Horak, 1994
- Telanepsia suppressella (Walker, 1864)
- Telanepsia tholopa (Turner, 1916)
- Telanepsia tidbinbilla Common & Horak, 1994
- Telanepsia trivialis (Meyrick, 1914)
- Ascetoloba lochmaea (Turner, 1917)
- Chezala aleurias Turner, 1917
- Chezala anaxia Turner, 1941
- Chezala aterpna Turner, 1941
- Chezala brachypepla (Meyrick, 1883)
- Chezala carella (Walker, 1864)
- Chezala carphalea (Meyrick, 1884)
- Chezala carphodes Turner, 1941
- Chezala cataxera (Meyrick, 1884)
- Chezala conjunctella (Walker, 1864)
- Chezala crypsileuca (Meyrick, 1884)
- Chezala erythrastis (Meyrick, 1889)
- Chezala fulvia (Butler, 1882)
- Chezala galactina (Turner, 1916)
- Chezala glaphyropla (Meyrick, 1884)
- Chezala isocycla Meyrick, 1922
- Chezala leparga (Turner, 1917)
- Chezala liquida (Meyrick, 1914)
- Chezala lucens Meyrick, 1915
- Chezala micranepsia (Turner, 1927)
- Chezala minyra (Meyrick, 1914)
- Chezala ochrobapta Lower, 1920
- Chezala osteochroa (Turner, 1898)
- Chezala privatella (Walker, 1864)
- Chezala silvestris Turner, 1917
- Chezala torva Turner, 1941
- Hadrognatha aetodes (Meyrick, 1889)
- Tanycaula acrophaea (Turner, 1916)
- Tanycaula ombrophora (Meyrick, 1883)
- Tanycaula platycapna (Turner, 1940)
- Tanycaula plesiosticta (Turner, 1938)
- Tanycaula semidalis (Turner, 1936)
- Cnecophora cinetica (Meyrick, 1884)
- Cnecophora melichrodes (Turner, 1898)
- Cnecophora rasilis (Turner, 1927)
- Diapatela placina (Turner, 1939)
- Diapatela semophanes (Meyrick, 1889)
- Diapatela thiopepla (Turner, 1939)
- Dissoloba caseicolor (Turner, 1944)
- Dissoloba cirrhodes (Meyrick, 1913)
- Dissoloba iochalca (Meyrick, 1886)
- Dissoloba ochrochoa (Lower, 1894)
- Prepalla anthracina (Turner, 1917)
- Prepalla cnephaea (Meyrick, 1889)
- Prepalla leucophlebia (Turner, 1941)
- Prepalla neurotenes (Turner, 1939)
- Prepalla phloeomima (Turner, 1939)
- Prepalla picea (Turner, 1939)
- Prepalla tephrina (Meyrick, 1884)
- Thema acratopa (Turner, 1939)
- Thema agastopis (Turner, 1939)
- Thema argoptera (Meyrick, 1884)
- Thema brevivitella Walker, 1864
- Thema chlorochyta (Meyrick, 1884)
- Thema endesma (Meyrick, 1884)
- Thema epiclines (Turner, 1939)
- Thema epitripta (Turner, 1917)
- Thema gypsina (Meyrick, 1884)
- Thema gypsosema (Turner, 1917)
- Thema holoxesta (Meyrick, 1889)
- Thema leucophara (Turner, 1914)
- Thema lomographa (Lower, 1902)
- Thema macroscia (Meyrick, 1889)
- Thema peloxantha (Meyrick, 1884)
- Thema protogramma (Meyrick, 1884)
- Thema proxima (Turner, 1939)
- Thema psammoxantha (Meyrick, 1884)
- Thema stasiastica (Meyrick, 1884)
- Thema xiphochrysa (Lower, 1905)
- Ericrypsina chorodoxa (Meyrick, 1920)
- Ericrypsina ductaria (Meyrick, 1913)
- Ericrypsina megalophanes Turner, 1938
- Acantholena acedesta (Turner, 1938)
- Acantholena dysaethria (Turner, 1938)
- Acantholena hiemalis (Meyrick, 1914)
- Acantholena siccella (Walker, 1864)
- Acedesta picicolor Turner, 1940
- Anomozancla scopariella (Walker, 1864)
- Delexocha ochrocausta (Meyrick, 1884)
- Epithymema amechana (Turner, 1944)
- Epithymema borborodes (Turner, 1917)
- Epithymema chrysocolla (Turner, 1896)
- Epithymema chrysopis (Meyrick, 1902)
- Epithymema crocias (Turner, 1941)
- Epithymema disparile Turner, 1914
- Epithymema gennaea (Turner, 1939)
- Epithymema helias (Meyrick, 1884)
- Epithymema idiophanes (Turner, 1941)
- Epithymema incomposita (Meyrick, 1884)
- Epithymema mimetis (Turner, 1917)
- Epithymema oridroma (Turner, 1940)
- Epithymema parile Turner, 1935
- Epithymema proselia (Turner, 1917)
- Epithymema tyrodes (Turner, 1938)
- Leistomorpha brontoscopa Meyrick, 1884
- Merocroca automima (Meyrick, 1889)
- Nephogenes abditella (Walker, 1863)
- Nephogenes achroa (Meyrick, 1914)
- Nephogenes desiccata (Meyrick, 1915)
- Nephogenes didymospila (Turner, 1936)
- Nephogenes graphica (Meyrick, 1888)
- Nephogenes melanoptila (Meyrick, 1883)
- Nephogenes mochlastis (Meyrick, 1888)
- Nephogenes philopsamma Meyrick, 1883
- Notodryas aeria Meyrick, 1897
- Notodryas callierga Meyrick, 1906
- Notodryas encrita (Lower, 1920)
- Notodryas vallata Meyrick, 1897
- Olbonoma asthenopis (Meyrick, 1889)
- Olbonoma callopistis (Meyrick, 1913)
- Olbonoma disticta (Turner, 1917)
- Olbonoma heliciotis (Turner, 1940)
- Olbonoma heterozona (Lower, 1894)
- Olbonoma leptospila (Meyrick, 1889)
- Olbonoma melliflua (Meyrick, 1884)
- Olbonoma plagiomochla (Turner, 1944)
- Olbonoma staitina Turner, 1940
- Olbonoma stenomita (Turner, 1944)
- Olbonoma thermistis (Meyrick, 1889)
- Olbonoma triptycha (Meyrick, 1884)
- Olenacantha egelida (Meyrick, 1883)
- Olenacantha parasema (Lower, 1920)
- Olenacantha tephropolia (Turner, 1938)
- Pantogymna themeropis (Meyrick, 1884)
- Pantogymna titanitis (Turner, 1927)
- Pantogymna zalocoma (Meyrick, 1884)
- Parergophela apricata (Meyrick, 1913)
- Parergophela ataurota (Turner, 1941)
- Parergophela crocobapta (Meyrick, 1884)
- Parergophela melirrhoa (Meyrick, 1884)
- Parergophela monadelta (Lower, 1897)
- Parergophela (Turner, 1941)
- Pellopsis aerodes (Meyrick, 1883)
- Phryganeutis cinerea Meyrick, 1884
- Platoloncha coniata (Meyrick, 1885)
- Platoloncha milichia (Meyrick, 1885)
- Platoloncha psamathina (Meyrick, 1885)
- Satrapia thesaurina Meyrick, 1886
- Trichomoeris amphichrysa Meyrick, 1913
- Trichomoeris heterochrysa Meyrick, 1922
- Ataleida lacteola (Turner, 1939)
- Endrosis sarcitrella (Linnaeus, 1758)
- Hofmannophila pseudospretella (Stainton, 1849)
- Macrophara aneureta (Turner, 1946)
- Trisyntopa euryspoda Lower, 1918
- Trisyntopa scatophaga (White, 1922)
- Diplogephyra amblyteles (Meyrick, 1889)
- Diplogephyra cyrtoloma (Turner, 1936)
- Diplogephyra sciophanes (Meyrick, 1883)
- Echinocosma catachrysa (Meyrick, 1889)
- Eusemocosma pruinosa (Meyrick, 1884)
- Gymnocoila callimeris (Meyrick, 1888)
- Gymnocoila cataplasta (Meyrick, 1888)
- Gymnocoila elaeota (Meyrick, 1888)
- Gymnocoila glaphyrota (Meyrick, 1888)
- Gymnocoila xanthocrossa (Meyrick, 1888)
- Haplodyta alloea (Turner, 1944)
- Haplodyta anisochroa (Turner, 1944)
- Haplodyta brachyomis (Meyrick, 1889)
- Haplodyta disema (Meyrick, 1884)
- Haplodyta lithochlora (Meyrick, 1889)
- Haplodyta noserodes (Meyrick, 1889)
- Haplodyta panxantha (Meyrick, 1884)
- Haplodyta polybotrya (Turner, 1917)
- Haplodyta thoracta Meyrick, 1886
- Isomoralla amylodes (Meyrick, 1884)
- Isomoralla causta (Turner, 1944)
- Isomoralla crocodes (Turner, 1944)
- Isomoralla curriculata (Meyrick, 1920)
- Isomoralla eriscota (Meyrick, 1889)
- Isomoralla eucista (Turner, 1917)
- Isomoralla gephyrota (Meyrick, 1884)
- Isomoralla melanomita (Turner, 1944)
- Isomoralla omichlota (Meyrick, 1884)
- Isomoralla philotherma (Meyrick, 1883)
- Isomoralla pyrrhoptera (Meyrick, 1884)
- Isomoralla silacea (Turner, 1917)
- Isomoralla triplectis (Meyrick, 1913)
- Microbela allocoma Meyrick, 1885
- Microbela epicona Meyrick, 1885
- Microbela monodyas Meyrick, 1885
- Microbela xanthopepla (Turner, 1944)
- Palimmeces adoxella (Meyrick, 1883)
- Palimmeces amaura (Meyrick, 1883)
- Palimmeces amauropis (Turner, 1938)
- Palimmeces amissella (Walker, 1864)
- Palimmeces amphileuca (Lower, 1903)
- Palimmeces autophaia Common, 1996
- Palimmeces centrotona (Meyrick, 1915)
- Palimmeces concolor (Turner, 1898)
- Palimmeces difficilis (Turner, 1939)
- Palimmeces frigescens (Meyrick, 1913)
- Palimmeces glaberrima (Turner, 1936)
- Palimmeces gypsota (Lower, 1893)
- Palimmeces habrophanes (Meyrick, 1883)
- Palimmeces hemiphanes (Meyrick, 1883)
- Palimmeces heptarcha (Meyrick, 1889)
- Palimmeces holopsara (Turner, 1937)
- Palimmeces homophanes (Turner, 1937)
- Palimmeces ithysticha Turner, 1916
- Palimmeces leucomitra (Meyrick, 1884)
- Palimmeces leucopelta (Meyrick, 1883)
- Palimmeces monolitha (Meyrick, 1884)
- Palimmeces nephobola (Turner, 1937)
- Palimmeces percna (Turner, 1938)
- Palimmeces petrophanes (Meyrick, 1914)
- Palimmeces phoryntis (Meyrick, 1902)
- Palimmeces poecilella (Meyrick, 1883)
- Palimmeces psarophanes (Turner, 1916)
- Palimmeces pseudomorpha (Turner, 1937)
- Palimmeces pycnographa (Turner, 1916)
- Palimmeces stephanota (Turner, 1937)
- Palimmeces synchroa (Turner, 1916)
- Palimmeces variegata (Meyrick, 1883)
- Palimmeces vernilis (Turner, 1933)
- Palimmeces vicina (Turner, 1916)
- Philobota abductella (Walker, 1864)
- Philobota aceraea (Meyrick, 1883)
- Philobota acerba (Turner, 1939)
- Philobota achranta (Turner, 1917)
- Philobota acompsa (Turner, 1939)
- Philobota acropola Meyrick, 1884
- Philobota actias (Lower, 1899)
- Philobota aedophanes Turner, 1944
- Philobota aethalea (Meyrick, 1883)
- Philobota agnesella (Newman, 1856)
- Philobota agrapha Turner, 1917
- Philobota amblopis Turner, 1944
- Philobota amblys Turner, 1944
- Philobota ameles Turner, 1944
- Philobota ancylotoxa Meyrick, 1884
- Philobota angustella (Walker, 1864)
- Philobota apora (Meyrick, 1883)
- Philobota arabella (Newman, 1856)
- Philobota archepeda (Meyrick, 1888)
- Philobota argotoxa Meyrick, 1889
- Philobota asemantica (Turner, 1944)
- Philobota atmobola Meyrick, 1884
- Philobota atmopis (Meyrick, 1889)
- Philobota atrisignis (Lower, 1900)
- Philobota austalea (Meyrick, 1884)
- Philobota auxolyca Meyrick, 1889
- Philobota baryptera (Turner, 1896)
- Philobota barysoma (Meyrick, 1883)
- Philobota basicapna (Turner, 1937)
- Philobota basiphaia Common, 1996
- Philobota bathrogramma (Turner, 1916)
- Philobota bathrophaea (Turner, 1914)
- Philobota biophora Meyrick, 1884
- Philobota brachystoma (Meyrick, 1915)
- Philobota byrsochra (Meyrick, 1915)
- Philobota calamaea Meyrick, 1884
- Philobota callistis (Meyrick, 1889)
- Philobota candida (Turner, 1898)
- Philobota capnonota (Turner, 1938)
- Philobota catharopa Turner, 1944
- Philobota celaenopa (Turner, 1936)
- Philobota centromita Turner, 1944
- Philobota cephalochrysa (Lower, 1894)
- Philobota chionoptera Meyrick, 1884
- Philobota chlorella (Meyrick, 1883)
- Philobota chrysopotama Meyrick, 1884
- Philobota cirrhocephala (Turner, 1917)
- Philobota cirrhopepla (Turner, 1916)
- Philobota clastosticha (Turner, 1939)
- Philobota cnecopasta (Turner, 1937)
- Philobota comarcha (Meyrick, 1920)
- Philobota cosmocrates Meyrick, 1889
- Philobota crassinervis (Lower, 1900)
- Philobota cretacea Meyrick, 1884
- Philobota crocopleura Turner, 1944
- Philobota crossoxantha (Lower, 1907)
- Philobota crypsichola Meyrick, 1884
- Philobota cryptea (Turner, 1938)
- Philobota curvilinea (Turner, 1896)
- Philobota cyphocentra (Meyrick, 1922)
- Philobota dedecorata Meyrick, 1915
- Philobota delochorda (Turner, 1917)
- Philobota delosema Turner, 1917
- Philobota delosticha (Lower, 1915)
- Philobota deltoloma (Lower, 1923)
- Philobota diaereta Turner, 1917
- Philobota dichotoma (Turner, 1941)
- Philobota dictyodes (Meyrick, 1889)
- Philobota dysphorata (Turner, 1938)
- Philobota egena (Turner, 1940)
- Philobota ellenella (Newman, 1856)
- Philobota embologramma (Turner, 1916)
- Philobota enchalca Turner, 1917
- Philobota ennephela (Meyrick, 1883)
- Philobota epibosca (Turner, 1937)
- Philobota epipercna (Turner, 1917)
- Philobota erebodes Meyrick, 1884
- Philobota eremosema Lower, 1915
- Philobota eremotropha (Turner, 1938)
- Philobota euarmosta Turner, 1944
- Philobota euchlora (Turner, 1896)
- Philobota euethira (Turner, 1944)
- Philobota euzancla (Turner, 1938)
- Philobota foedatella (Walker, 1864)
- Philobota fumifera (Turner, 1939)
- Philobota futilis Meyrick, 1920
- Philobota glaucoptera Meyrick, 1884
- Philobota gonostropha Lower, 1896
- Philobota grammatica (Meyrick, 1883)
- Philobota haplogramma (Turner, 1917)
- Philobota haplostola (Turner, 1937)
- Philobota hemera (Meyrick, 1886)
- Philobota hemichrysa (Lower, 1916)
- Philobota heptasticta (Turner, 1937)
- Philobota heterophaea Turner, 1944
- Philobota hexasticta (Turner, 1937)
- Philobota hiracistis Meyrick, 1889
- Philobota homochroa (Turner, 1916)
- Philobota homophyla (Turner, 1937)
- Philobota humerella (Walker, 1863)
- Philobota hydara Meyrick, 1884
- Philobota hylophila (Turner, 1917)
- Philobota hypocausta Meyrick, 1884
- Philobota hypopolia (Turner, 1917)
- Philobota ignava Meyrick, 1913
- Philobota immemor (Meyrick, 1913)
- Philobota impletella (Walker, 1869)
- Philobota incompta Turner, 1944
- Philobota iphigenes Meyrick, 1889
- Philobota ischnodes (Meyrick, 1902)
- Philobota ischnophanes (Turner, 1937)
- Philobota isonoma Common, 1996
- Philobota latifissella (Walker, 1864)
- Philobota laxeuta (Meyrick, 1913)
- Philobota leptochorda (Turner, 1916)
- Philobota leucodelta (Turner, 1938)
- Philobota limenarcha Meyrick, 1913
- Philobota lochmaula (Turner, 1917)
- Philobota lonchota Turner, 1896
- Philobota lutulenta (Meyrick, 1913)
- Philobota lysizona Meyrick, 1889
- Philobota macrostola (Turner, 1938)
- Philobota marcens Meyrick, 1914
- Philobota mathematica (Meyrick, 1883)
- Philobota melanoglypta Meyrick, 1889
- Philobota melanogypsa (Turner, 1938)
- Philobota melanoxantha Meyrick, 1889
- Philobota melanthes (Lower, 1899)
- Philobota meraca (Turner, 1937)
- Philobota metaxantha (Turner, 1941)
- Philobota microxantha Meyrick, 1889
- Philobota moestella (Walker, 1864)
- Philobota monogramma Meyrick, 1884
- Philobota monoides (Turner, 1917)
- Philobota monospila (Turner, 1937)
- Philobota mucida (Turner, 1938)
- Philobota myrochrista (Meyrick, 1920)
- Philobota napaea (Turner, 1917)
- Philobota nephelarcha Meyrick, 1884
- Philobota nephelota Turner, 1944
- Philobota obliviosa Meyrick, 1913
- Philobota ochlophila (Turner, 1938)
- Philobota olympias Meyrick, 1889
- Philobota omotypa Turner, 1944
- Philobota orecta (Turner, 1938)
- Philobota orescoa (Meyrick, 1883)
- Philobota orinoma Meyrick, 1884
- Philobota ortholoma (Turner, 1937)
- Philobota orthomita Turner, 1917
- Philobota orthotoma Turner, 1917
- Philobota oxyptila (Turner, 1937)
- Philobota pachychorda (Turner, 1937)
- Philobota pacifera (Meyrick, 1914)
- Philobota paragypsa Lower, 1900
- Philobota partitella (Walker, 1864)
- Philobota pasteoptera (Turner, 1937)
- Philobota pedetis Meyrick, 1884
- Philobota perangusta (Turner, 1936)
- Philobota perioeca (Turner, 1937)
- Philobota perixantha Turner, 1896
- Philobota perpetua (Meyrick, 1913)
- Philobota petrinodes (Lower, 1901)
- Philobota phaeodelta (Turner, 1937)
- Philobota philostaura (Meyrick, 1883)
- Philobota phlaura (Turner, 1938)
- Philobota physaula Meyrick, 1914
- Philobota pilidiota (Turner, 1917)
- Philobota pilipes (Butler, 1882)
- Philobota placophaea (Turner, 1937)
- Philobota plesiosperma (Turner, 1937)
- Philobota pleurosticha (Turner, 1936)
- Philobota plicilinea (Turner, 1938)
- Philobota polypenthes (Turner, 1939)
- Philobota prepodes (Turner, 1937)
- Philobota productella (Walker, 1864)
- Philobota profuga (Meyrick, 1913)
- Philobota proscedes (Turner, 1936)
- Philobota protecta Meyrick, 1920
- Philobota protorthra (Meyrick, 1883)
- Philobota psacasta (Meyrick, 1883)
- Philobota psammochroa (Lower, 1894)
- Philobota publicana (Meyrick, 1914)
- Philobota pulvifera (Turner, 1937)
- Philobota pycnoda (Lower, 1907)
- Philobota pyrota (Meyrick, 1889)
- Philobota rhadinosticha (Turner, 1938)
- Philobota rhipidura (Meyrick, 1913)
- Philobota ruinosa (Meyrick, 1913)
- Philobota scieropa Meyrick, 1889
- Philobota scioessa (Turner, 1938)
- Philobota scitula (Turner, 1917)
- Philobota semantica (Turner, 1916)
- Philobota silignias (Lower, 1899)
- Philobota similis (Turner, 1937)
- Philobota sophia Turner, 1896
- Philobota sordidella (Walker, 1864)
- Philobota sphenoleuca Lower, 1907
- Philobota spodotis Turner, 1944
- Philobota stella (Newman, 1856)
- Philobota stenophylla (Turner, 1939)
- Philobota stenotypa (Turner, 1917)
- Philobota sthenopis Turner, 1927
- Philobota stictoloma (Turner, 1944)
- Philobota stramentaria (Turner, 1916)
- Philobota strigatella (Donovan, 1805)
- Philobota strongyla (Turner, 1936)
- Philobota susanae (Lower, 1900)
- Philobota syncolla (Turner, 1917)
- Philobota syneches (Turner, 1914)
- Philobota synnephes (Turner, 1937)
- Philobota tanyscia (Meyrick, 1883)
- Philobota thiobaphes (Turner, 1937)
- Philobota thiocrossa (Turner, 1917)
- Philobota thiogramma Meyrick, 1889
- Philobota tranquilla (Turner, 1937)
- Philobota transversella (Walker, 1864)
- Philobota trigonosema (Turner, 1937)
- Philobota xanthastis (Meyrick, 1889)
- Philobota xanthodisca Turner, 1944
- Philobota xanthopolia (Turner, 1941)
- Philobota xanthoprepes Turner, 1917
- Philobota xerodes (Lower, 1900)
- Philobota xipheres Turner, 1896
- Philobota xiphopepla (Lower, 1920)
- Philobota xiphostola Meyrick, 1884
- Philobota xuthocrana (Turner, 1937)
- Philobota xylochroa (Lower, 1893)
- Philobota zalias (Lower, 1899)
- Prepocosma achylopa (Turner, 1936)
- Prepocosma acibdela (Turner, 1940)
- Prepocosma aplasta (Meyrick, 1914)
- Prepocosma argochroa (Turner, 1936)
- Prepocosma asthenospila (Turner, 1936)
- Prepocosma ataurota (Turner, 1944)
- Prepocosma byssodes (Turner, 1940)
- Prepocosma commoda (Turner, 1936)
- Prepocosma consimilis (Turner, 1936)
- Prepocosma cycnoptera (Meyrick, 1888)
- Prepocosma eriopa (Lower, 1900)
- Prepocosma haplopa (Turner, 1940)
- Prepocosma homomorpha (Turner, 1940)
- Prepocosma hylobita (Turner, 1917)
- Prepocosma hyperleuca (Turner, 1940)
- Prepocosma innocens (Meyrick, 1913)
- Prepocosma leptogramma (Turner, 1936)
- Prepocosma megalospora (Turner, 1936)
- Prepocosma melanospora (Meyrick, 1886)
- Prepocosma micropasta (Turner, 1940)
- Prepocosma modica (Turner, 1916)
- Prepocosma pallidula (Turner, 1936)
- Prepocosma pediaula (Turner, 1938)
- Prepocosma phaeostephes (Meyrick, 1888)
- Prepocosma puncta (Turner, 1947)
- Prepocosma schalidota (Meyrick, 1888)
- Prepocosma subtilis (Turner, 1940)
- Prepocosma tropica (Meyrick, 1888)
- Prodelodes samphoras (Meyrick, 1886)
- Stereocheta gummosa (Meyrick, 1913)
- Stereocheta ocularis (Turner, 1896)
- Stereocheta poliocrossa (Turner, 1944)
- Stereocheta sciocrossa (Meyrick, 1913)
- Telocharacta hemicroca (Lower, 1903)
- Telocharacta metachroa (Meyrick, 1889)
- Acolasta brachysticha (Turner, 1935)
- Acolasta rhabdora (Turner, 1937)
- Acolasta scolia Meyrick, 1902
- Aristeis chrysoteuches Meyrick, 1884
- Aristeis hepialella (Walker, 1864)
- Aristeis niphodisca (Turner, 1940)
- Atheropla barytypa Turner, 1939
- Atheropla bathroxantha (Turner, 1939)
- Atheropla calamaea (Turner, 1935)
- Atheropla chorias Meyrick, 1902
- Atheropla crocea Turner, 1939
- Atheropla decaspila Meyrick, 1889
- Atheropla dolichotricha (Turner, 1927)
- Atheropla esthlopis (Turner, 1917)
- Atheropla fumosa Turner, 1927
- Atheropla hemispila (Meyrick, 1889)
- Atheropla melichlora Meyrick, 1884
- Atheropla nigricincta (Meyrick, 1921)
- Atheropla psammodes (Turner, 1898)
- Atheropla psilopis Meyrick, 1889
- Atheropla scioxantha Lower, 1902
- Atheropla triplaca (Meyrick, 1902)
- Diplogrypa microptera (Turner, 1916)
- Eulechria absona (Turner, 1917)
- Eulechria aclina (Turner, 1932)
- Eulechria acrotropa (Meyrick, 1884)
- Eulechria adoxodes (Turner, 1933)
- Eulechria ancyrota (Meyrick, 1883)
- Eulechria aphaura Meyrick, 1888
- Eulechria arctans (T.P. Lucas, 1900)
- Eulechria argolina (Meyrick, 1889)
- Eulechria atmospila Turner, 1916
- Eulechria auantis (Meyrick, 1889)
- Eulechria aureola (Turner, 1898)
- Eulechria autographa (Meyrick, 1902)
- Eulechria balanota (Meyrick, 1889)
- Eulechria basiplaga (Walker, 1863)
- Eulechria callidesma (Lower, 1894)
- Eulechria capsellata Meyrick, 1913
- Eulechria catharistis Turner, 1916
- Eulechria ceratina (Meyrick, 1884)
- Eulechria ceratochroa Lower, 1920
- Eulechria chersomicta (Meyrick, 1920)
- Eulechria chionospila (Turner, 1941)
- Eulechria chrysodeta (Turner, 1941)
- Eulechria chrysomochla Turner, 1937
- Eulechria chrysozona (Turner, 1896)
- Eulechria clytophanes (Turner, 1941)
- Eulechria cocytias (Meyrick, 1915)
- Eulechria contentella (Walker, 1864)
- Eulechria convictella (Walker, 1864)
- Eulechria corsota Meyrick, 1914
- Eulechria delicia (Turner, 1917)
- Eulechria delospila Turner, 1916
- Eulechria delosticta (Turner, 1944)
- Eulechria diacrita (Turner, 1917)
- Eulechria diaphanes Turner, 1898
- Eulechria diasticha Turner, 1937
- Eulechria dichroa (Lower, 1893)
- Eulechria diploclethra Turner, 1916
- Eulechria drosocapna Meyrick, 1920
- Eulechria dysimera Turner, 1938
- Eulechria electrodes (Meyrick, 1884)
- Eulechria empheres Turner, 1938
- Eulechria encratodes Meyrick, 1922
- Eulechria epicausta Meyrick, 1883
- Eulechria epimicta (Meyrick, 1886)
- Eulechria eremnopa (Turner, 1917)
- Eulechria eriphila Meyrick, 1888
- Eulechria euadelpha (Lower, 1901)
- Eulechria eucrita (Turner, 1917)
- Eulechria eurycneca Turner, 1937
- Eulechria eurygramma Turner, 1916
- Eulechria exanimis Meyrick, 1883
- Eulechria flavipuncta (Turner, 1933)
- Eulechria gypsochroa Turner, 1937
- Eulechria habrosema (Turner, 1944)
- Eulechria haplopepla Turner, 1938
- Eulechria haplophara (Turner, 1915)
- Eulechria haplopolia Turner, 1938
- Eulechria haplosticta Turner, 1938
- Eulechria heliocoma Meyrick, 1888
- Eulechria heliodora Meyrick, 1888
- Eulechria heliophanes (Lower, 1894)
- Eulechria hemiochra (Turner, 1935)
- Eulechria hemisphaerica (Meyrick, 1886)
- Eulechria hilda (Turner, 1917)
- Eulechria holodascia Turner, 1938
- Eulechria homochra Turner, 1938
- Eulechria homopela (Turner, 1933)
- Eulechria homophyes (Turner, 1941)
- Eulechria homospora Meyrick, 1913
- Eulechria homotona (Meyrick, 1884)
- Eulechria hymenaea Meyrick, 1902
- Eulechria ischnota (Lower, 1903)
- Eulechria isogramma (Meyrick, 1884)
- Eulechria isozona (Lower, 1901)
- Eulechria leptobela Meyrick, 1883
- Eulechria leptocneca (Turner, 1933)
- Eulechria leptopasta Turner, 1938
- Eulechria leptosema Common, 1996
- Eulechria lissophanes Turner, 1938
- Eulechria lissopolia (Turner, 1927)
- Eulechria lunata (Turner, 1896)
- Eulechria malacoptera Meyrick, 1888
- Eulechria malacostola (Turner, 1941)
- Eulechria marmorata (Meyrick, 1889)
- Eulechria mechanica (Meyrick, 1889)
- Eulechria melanoploca (Meyrick, 1884)
- Eulechria melesella (Newman, 1856)
- Eulechria metacroca (Turner, 1944)
- Eulechria metarga (Turner, 1939)
- Eulechria micranepsia Turner, 1938
- Eulechria microschema (Meyrick, 1883)
- Eulechria modesta (Turner, 1944)
- Eulechria nephelella (Turner, 1898)
- Eulechria niphobola Lower, 1920
- Eulechria omosema Meyrick, 1920
- Eulechria ophiodes (Meyrick, 1889)
- Eulechria orbitalis Meyrick, 1922
- Eulechria orbitosa Meyrick, 1920
- Eulechria orestera (Turner, 1917)
- Eulechria orgiastis (Meyrick, 1889)
- Eulechria oxytona (Turner, 1916)
- Eulechria pallidella Meyrick, 1883
- Eulechria pantelella Meyrick, 1883
- Eulechria pastea (Turner, 1927)
- Eulechria paurophylla (Turner, 1916)
- Eulechria pentamera (Lower, 1893)
- Eulechria pentatypa (Turner, 1941)
- Eulechria perdita Meyrick, 1883
- Eulechria periphanes (Turner, 1944)
- Eulechria permeata (Meyrick, 1913)
- Eulechria phaeina (Turner, 1896)
- Eulechria phoenissa Meyrick, 1902
- Eulechria pissograpta Turner, 1938
- Eulechria platyrrhabda Turner, 1937
- Eulechria polioleuca (Turner, 1933)
- Eulechria psaritis (Turner, 1933)
- Eulechria psilopla (Meyrick, 1884)
- Eulechria pulverea (Meyrick, 1884)
- Eulechria pyrgophora (Turner, 1941)
- Eulechria rhymodes Meyrick, 1914
- Eulechria sciosticha (Turner, 1941)
- Eulechria sigmophora (Meyrick, 1884)
- Eulechria sphaeroides (Turner, 1896)
- Eulechria sphodra (Turner, 1941)
- Eulechria spreta Turner, 1939
- Eulechria stadiota (Meyrick, 1889)
- Eulechria stigmatophora Turner, 1896
- Eulechria stoechodes (Turner, 1936)
- Eulechria subpunctella (Walker, 1864)
- Eulechria suffusa (Turner, 1936)
- Eulechria symbleta (Turner, 1914)
- Eulechria syngenes (Turner, 1941)
- Eulechria tephrochroa Turner, 1916
- Eulechria theorica (Meyrick, 1884)
- Eulechria thermochroa (Meyrick, 1884)
- Eulechria theticophara Turner, 1938
- Eulechria threnodes Turner, 1916
- Eulechria timida Meyrick, 1914
- Eulechria tolmera (Turner, 1941)
- Eulechria triferella (Walker, 1864)
- Eulechria vegrandis (Meyrick, 1884)
- Eulechria xanthophylla Turner, 1937
- Eulechria xenomima (Meyrick, 1913)
- Eulechria xeropterella Common, 1996
- Eulechria xuthophylla Turner, 1937
- Eulechria xuthoptila Turner, 1938
- Eulechria zophoptera Turner, 1938
- Eulechria zoropa Turner, 1938
- Hoplostega ochroma (Meyrick, 1886)
- Pachybela argocentra (Lower, 1901)
- Pachybela cremnodisema (Lower, 1897)
- Pachybela crustulata (Meyrick, 1913)
- Pachybela eremica Turner, 1917
- Pachybela eurypolia Turner, 1939
- Pachybela leporina (Meyrick, 1914)
- Pachybela maculisarca (Lower, 1915)
- Pachybela oncera (Turner, 1941)
- Pachybela parisa Turner, 1917
- Pachybela peloma (Lower, 1900)
- Pachybela sarcosma (Lower, 1896)
- Pachybela tetraspora (Lower, 1900)
- Petalanthes diploxantha Meyrick, 1914
- Petalanthes hexastera Meyrick, 1883
- Petalanthes microphrica Turner, 1935
- Petalanthes periclyta Meyrick, 1883
- Petalanthes sphaerophora Meyrick, 1883
- Sclerocris acropenthes (Turner, 1939)
- Sclerocris albipalpis (Turner, 1939)
- Sclerocris amoebaea (Meyrick, 1889)
- Sclerocris amphisema (Lower, 1907)
- Sclerocris chalcoxantha (Meyrick, 1889)
- Sclerocris chiastis (Meyrick, 1889)
- Sclerocris comoxantha (Meyrick, 1889)
- Sclerocris cremnodes (Meyrick, 1883)
- Sclerocris crocinastis (Meyrick, 1889)
- Sclerocris cyclodesma (Turner, 1938)
- Sclerocris echidnias (Meyrick, 1889)
- Sclerocris goniosticha (Turner, 1939)
- Sclerocris gymnastica (Meyrick, 1920)
- Sclerocris menodes (Meyrick, 1888)
- Sclerocris nephelopa (Meyrick, 1883)
- Sclerocris nomistis (Meyrick, 1889)
- Sclerocris ochrosarca (Turner, 1938)
- Sclerocris pithanodes (Meyrick, 1920)
- Sclerocris styphlodes (Turner, 1946)
- Sclerocris tetragona (Meyrick, 1889)
- Sclerocris tetrasticha (Turner, 1944)
- Sclerocris thetica (Turner, 1916)
- Sclerocris thiodes (Turner, 1917)
- Temnogyropa cedea (Turner, 1944)
- Temnogyropa cosmozona (Turner, 1940)
- Temnogyropa insolita (Turner, 1940)
- Temnogyropa stenomorpha (Turner, 1940)
- Exarsia paracycla (Lower, 1897)
- Periallactis monostropha (Lower, 1897)
- Oresitropha melanotypa Turner, 1927
- Aspasiodes plectrantha (Meyrick, 1913)
- Phloioletes diachorda (Turner, 1939)
- Phloioletes spanioleuca (Turner, 1933)
- Machetis aphrobola Meyrick, 1883
- Machetis diamochla Turner, 1941
- Machetis dicranotypa (Turner, 1935)
- Machetis plagiozona Turner, 1917
- Machetis versatrix Meyrick, 1914
- Pyrgoptila serpentina Meyrick, 1889
- Pyrgoptila zalotypa (Turner, 1935)
- Sthenozancla plagiotypa (Turner, 1941)
- Syscalma cleophanta Meyrick, 1922
- Syscalma percara (Turner, 1940)
- Syscalma prymnaea Meyrick, 1920
- Syscalma stenoxantha Turner, 1940
- Baioglossa anisopasta (Turner, 1935)
- Casmara exculta (Meyrick, 1914)
- Casmara regalis Diakonoff, 1966
- Elaeonoma deltacostamela (Lower, 1896)
- Eremnozona straminea (Turner, 1917)
- Lasiocosma homalota (Meyrick, 1889)
- Leimmatonca chromatica (Turner, 1935)
- Leimmatonca dasylopha (Lower, 1920)
- Leipochlida phaulostola (Turner, 1935)
- Leipochlida spreta (Meyrick, 1920)
- Meioglossa pentochra (Lower, 1894)
- Mermeristis spodiaea (Meyrick, 1915)
- Phriconyma lucifuga Meyrick, 1883
- Thapsinotypa anthemodes (Meyrick, 1886)
- Barea acalles (Turner, 1927)
- Barea acritopis (Turner, 1917)
- Barea acrocapna (Turner, 1938)
- Barea adelosema (Lower, 1920)
- Barea aeglitis (Turner, 1940)
- Barea aleuropasta Turner, 1935
- Barea anerasta Turner, 1916
- Barea angusta Turner, 1935
- Barea anisochroa (Turner, 1935)
- Barea arrhythma (Turner, 1917)
- Barea asbolaea (Meyrick, 1883)
- Barea atmophora Turner, 1916
- Barea basigramma (Turner, 1896)
- Barea bathrochorda Turner, 1935
- Barea bryochroa Turner, 1916
- Barea bryopis Turner, 1935
- Barea centropis (Meyrick, 1889)
- Barea ceramodes Turner, 1935
- Barea chloreis (Turner, 1914)
- Barea chlorozona Lower, 1923
- Barea codrella (R. Felder & Rogenhofer, 1875)
- Barea coeliota Turner, 1935
- Barea confusella (Walker, 1864)
- Barea consignatella Walker, 1864
- Barea crassipalpis Turner, 1935
- Barea cratista Turner, 1935
- Barea crypsicentra (Meyrick, 1914)
- Barea crypsipyrrha (Turner, 1938)
- Barea delophanes (Meyrick, 1889)
- Barea desmophora (Meyrick, 1883)
- Barea discincta (Meyrick, 1884)
- Barea dryocoetes (Turner, 1939)
- Barea ebenopa Turner, 1935
- Barea eburnea (Turner, 1935)
- Barea eclecta Turner, 1935
- Barea epethistis (Meyrick, 1902)
- Barea eucapnodes (Turner, 1896)
- Barea euprepes (Turner, 1896)
- Barea eusciasta (Turner, 1916)
- Barea exarcha (Meyrick, 1883)
- Barea fenicoma (Meyrick, 1914)
- Barea fervescens (Turner, 1937)
- Barea glaphyra Turner, 1935
- Barea graphica Turner, 1935
- Barea gypsomicta (Turner, 1937)
- Barea helica (Meyrick, 1883)
- Barea hylodroma Turner, 1916
- Barea hyperarcha (Meyrick, 1889)
- Barea illepida (Turner, 1927)
- Barea inconcinna (Turner, 1927)
- Barea indecorella (Walker, 1864)
- Barea intricata (Turner, 1944)
- Barea lamprota Lower, 1923
- Barea leucocephala (Turner, 1896)
- Barea limpida Turner, 1935
- Barea lithoglypta (Meyrick, 1883)
- Barea melanodelta (Meyrick, 1883)
- Barea meridarcha (Meyrick, 1889)
- Barea mesocentra (Meyrick, 1889)
- Barea micropis (Meyrick, 1889)
- Barea nicaea (Meyrick, 1902)
- Barea nymphica Turner, 1916
- Barea ochrospora Turner, 1935
- Barea ombromorpha (Meyrick, 1920)
- Barea omophaea (Turner, 1941)
- Barea ophiosticha Turner, 1935
- Barea orthoptila (Lower, 1901)
- Barea panarcha (Turner, 1915)
- Barea pasteodes (Turner, 1914)
- Barea peisteria (Turner, 1937)
- Barea periodica Meyrick, 1920
- Barea phaeobrya Turner, 1935
- Barea phaeomochla (Turner, 1938)
- Barea phaulobrya Turner, 1935
- Barea phoenochyta (Turner, 1927)
- Barea pissina Turner, 1935
- Barea placophora (Turner, 1947)
- Barea platyochra Turner, 1935
- Barea plesiosticta Turner, 1935
- Barea poliobrya Turner, 1935
- Barea polytypa (Turner, 1935)
- Barea prepta Turner, 1935
- Barea psathyropa (Turner, 1927)
- Barea psologramma Turner, 1916
- Barea ptochica (Turner, 1917)
- Barea pyrora (Meyrick, 1914)
- Barea sciaspila (Lower, 1904)
- Barea semifixa Meyrick, 1915
- Barea semocausta (Meyrick, 1883)
- Barea sideritis Turner, 1935
- Barea sphaeridias (Meyrick, 1914)
- Barea subviridella (Turner, 1896)
- Barea synchyta (Meyrick, 1883)
- Barea tanyptila Turner, 1935
- Barea trissosema (Turner, 1939)
- Barea trizyga (Meyrick, 1914)
- Barea turbatella (Walker, 1864)
- Barea umbrosa (Meyrick, 1914)
- Barea viduata (Meyrick, 1920)
- Barea xanthocoma (Lower, 1897)
- Barea xanthoptera Turner, 1935
- Barea ypsilon Turner, 1935
- Barea zeugmatophora Turner, 1935
- Barea zophospila (Turner, 1944)
- Barea zygophora (Meyrick, 1889)
- Delophanes anthracephala (Lower, 1894)
- Diocrogephyra rhodobapta (Turner, 1938)
- Erythrobapta haemalea (Turner, 1916)
- Erythrobapta picimacula (Turner, 1935)
- Habrochlanis epiphaula (Meyrick, 1889)
- Habrochlanis fragilis (Meyrick, 1914)
- Habrochlanis poliocrana (Meyrick, 1886)
- Ischnomorpha charierga (Meyrick, 1889)
- Ischnomorpha idiotropa (Turner, 1936)
- Ischnomorpha thrypticopa (Meyrick, 1902)
- Liozancla holophaea Turner, 1919
- Locheutis delopasta Turner, 1939
- Locheutis myrophenges Turner, 1935
- Locheutis philochora Meyrick, 1883
- Macronemata elaphia Meyrick, 1883
- Micramicta amolgaea (Turner, 1938)
- Micramicta cephalanthes (Meyrick, 1888)
- Micramicta citritis (Turner, 1935)
- Micramicta crococephala (Turner, 1944)
- Micramicta flaccida (Meyrick, 1913)
- Ochyrolopha praecana (Meyrick, 1913)
- Oncomerista ochrophaea (Meyrick, 1883)
- Opsitycha squalidella (Meyrick, 1884)
- Ozotrypetes atrispersa (Turner, 1916)
- Ozotrypetes stenota (Meyrick, 1889)
- Sphyrelata amotella (Walker, 1864)
- Sphyrelata deltotypa (Turner, 1941)
- Sphyrelata eudmeta (Turner, 1917)
- Sphyrelata melanoleuca Meyrick, 1883
- Sphyrelata mesoplaca (Turner, 1941)
- Stenoptena icmaea (Meyrick, 1915)
- Triacra doxastica (Meyrick, 1889)
- Actenotis diasema (Turner, 1935)
- Airogephyra amydrodes (Turner, 1937)
- Airogephyra mochlonota (Turner, 1939)
- Airogephyra ochrogramma (Turner, 1939)
- Airogephyra ochronota (Turner, 1944)
- Airogephyra ochrosticta (Turner, 1944)
- Analcodes esharias (Meyrick, 1921)
- Antiopala ebenospila Turner, 1917
- Antiopala tephraea Meyrick, 1889
- Atalopsis cerochyta (Turner, 1940)
- Atalopsis costipuncta (Turner, 1940)
- Atalopsis heniocha (Meyrick, 1886)
- Atalopsis leptadelpha (Lower, 1920)
- Atalopsis melanossa (Turner, 1940)
- Catadoceta xanthostephana (Meyrick, 1888)
- Cirrograpta sporadica Common, 2000
- Cirromitra tetratherma (Lower, 1896)
- Coelognatha physica (Meyrick, 1920)
- Coelognatha xanthocephala (Lower, 1893)
- Diaphanta abares (Turner, 1941)
- Diaphanta adocima (Turner, 1935)
- Diaphanta arenivaga (Meyrick, 1884)
- Diaphanta eucryphaea (Turner, 1935)
- Diaphanta fuliginosa (Turner, 1935)
- Diaphanta litopis (Turner, 1936)
- Diaphanta pleurospila (Turner, 1935)
- Diaphanta silvicola (Turner, 1898)
- Diaphanta tetraspila (Turner, 1935)
- Diaphanta themerodes (Meyrick, 1902)
- Dolopsis apathodes (Meyrick, 1914)
- Dolopsis chalcophragma (Meyrick, 1889)
- Dolopsis coenodes (Meyrick, 1889)
- Dolopsis inferna (Lower, 1899)
- Dolopsis oxysema (Lower, 1903)
- Dolopsis perinyctis (Meyrick, 1889)
- Dolopsis xenopis (Meyrick, 1889)
- Dysthreneta lepta Turner, 1947
- Echinognatha comorrhoa (Turner, 1938)
- Echinognatha phanerosticta (Turner, 1933)
- Echinognatha tanytricha (Turner, 1933)
- Echinognatha trichoceros (Turner, 1933)
- Enlopholepis mediolinea (Turner, 1938)
- Ereiconastes amphidoxa (Meyrick, 1889)
- Ereiconastes butyrea (Turner, 1935)
- Ereiconastes torosema (Meyrick, 1889)
- Eulachna dasyptera Meyrick, 1884
- Eulachna droseropa Turner, 1940
- Guestia balia (Turner, 1933)
- Guestia chaetophora (Turner, 1933)
- Guestia uniformis (Meyrick, 1886)
- Hesperenoeca geraeopa (Meyrick, 1913)
- Hesperenoeca germinalis (Meyrick, 1913)
- Hesperenoeca leucostemma (Turner, 1941)
- Hesperenoeca solaris (Meyrick, 1913)
- Laxonoma abductella (Meyrick, 1884)
- Laxonoma hololeuca (Meyrick, 1884)
- Laxonoma leptostola (Meyrick, 1884)
- Leprocosma callizona (Meyrick, 1884)
- Leprocosma hoplophanes (Meyrick, 1889)
- Leprocosma phormictis (Meyrick, 1913)
- Leprocosma photodotis (Meyrick, 1889)
- Leptocroca sanguinolenta Meyrick, 1886
- Machaeritis aegrella Meyrick, 1886
- Machaeritis apocrypha (Turner, 1914)
- Machaeritis dystechna (Meyrick, 1889)
- Machaeritis indocta (Meyrick, 1886)
- Machaeritis myrodes Turner, 1944
- Machaeritis parastatis Turner, 1940
- Machaeritis pelinopa (Meyrick, 1902)
- Machaeritis pleuromochla Turner, 1944
- Machaeritis proseches Turner, 1940
- Machaeritis xanthomitra Turner, 1940
- Melanoima pentaspila (Lower, 1900)
- Micropeteina dryinodes (Meyrick, 1889)
- Neosigala hyperopta (Meyrick, 1889)
- Neosigala lathraea (Turner, 1916)
- Ochropolia aclita (Turner, 1938)
- Ochropolia micrastis (Lower, 1900)
- Oncolapara anarcha (Meyrick, 1889)
- Pachyceraia ochromochla (Turner, 1938)
- Pachyceraia torvella (Turner, 1938)
- Protomacha chalcaspis Meyrick, 1884
- Protomacha notia (Turner, 1941)
- Protomacha ochrochalca Meyrick, 1889
- Protomacha paralia Meyrick, 1913
- Psarophorca olympias (Lower, 1899)
- Psarophorca perigypsa (Lower, 1901)
- Psarophorca tapinophanes (Turner, 1940)
- Rhoecoceros pelomorpha Turner, 1940
- Saropla amydropis Meyrick, 1889
- Saropla ancistrotis Meyrick, 1889
- Saropla caelatella Meyrick, 1884
- Saropla consuetella (Walker, 1864)
- Saropla harpactis Meyrick, 1889
- Saropla philocala Meyrick, 1884
- Saropla vanescens (Meyrick, 1915)
- Saropla vernalis (Meyrick, 1884)
- Saropla xanthocoma (Lower, 1899)
- Scoliocheta ergatis (Meyrick, 1884)
- Sympoecila antygota (Meyrick, 1914)
- Sympoecila athletis (Meyrick, 1888)
- Sympoecila callisceptra (Meyrick, 1888)
- Sympoecila cholerodes (Meyrick, 1888)
- Sympoecila delotypa (Turner, 1941)
- Sympoecila diachorda (Turner, 1941)
- Sympoecila epichrista (Turner, 1937)
- Sympoecila euryptila (Turner, 1941)
- Sympoecila gypsopleura (Turner, 1916)
- Sympoecila halmopeda (Meyrick, 1888)
- Sympoecila holocrossa (Meyrick, 1889)
- Sympoecila hyperchlora (Meyrick, 1888)
- Sympoecila leucophanes (Meyrick, 1883)
- Sympoecila nepheloma (Lower, 1899)
- Sympoecila ochrocirrha (Turner, 1927)
- Sympoecila phaeosceptra (Meyrick, 1888)
- Sympoecila picraula (Lower, 1920)
- Sympoecila polybalia (Turner, 1938)
- Sympoecila thrincotis (Meyrick, 1888)
- Sympoecila tyroxantha (Meyrick, 1884)
- Syncometes holopsamma (Turner, 1944)
- Syncometes vilis (Turner, 1944)
- Trinaconeura homogypsa Turner, 1933
- Aglaodes chionoma Turner, 1898
- Tisobarica eranna Turner, 1916
- Tisobarica habromorpha Lower, 1923
- Tisobarica hedanopa Turner, 1916
- Tisobarica hemigenes (Meyrick, 1889)
- Tisobarica jucundella Walker, 1864
- Tisobarica larotypa Turner, 1916
- Tisobarica pyrrhella (Turner, 1896)
- Tisobarica thyteria (Meyrick, 1889)
- Aeolocosma cycloxantha Meyrick, 1906
- Aeolocosma iridozona Meyrick, 1880
- Ancistroneura ammophara Turner, 1947
- Ancistroneura thaumasia Turner, 1947
- Chioneocephala ochroptera (Meyrick, 1884)
- Clonitica eusarca (Meyrick, 1902)
- Copidostola orthotis Lower, 1897
- Corethropalpa melanoneura (Meyrick, 1884)
- Corynotricha amalodes (Meyrick, 1889)
- Corynotricha antipodella (Wallengren, 1861)
- Corynotricha habrodes (Lower, 1899)
- Corynotricha trimeris (Lower, 1902)
- Crossophora semiota Meyrick, 1886
- Diasceta aeolias (Meyrick, 1889)
- Diasceta furtiva (Turner, 1940)
- Diasceta phaeocosma (Meyrick, 1889)
- Diasceta terpnopis (Turner, 1944)
- Eridolera leucostephes (Turner, 1939)
- Eridolera tenellula (Turner, 1939)
- Joonggoora cunctilineata T. P. Lucas, 1901
- Joonggoora tricollata T. P. Lucas, 1901
- Leptocopa notoplecta Meyrick, 1918
- Leurophanes oresibates Turner, 1939
- Lonchoptena episcota (Meyrick, 1889)
- Metaphrastis acrochalca Meyrick, 1907
- Metaphrastis corusca (Turner, 1935)
- Microlocha entypa Meyrick, 1914
- Mimobrachyoma basileuca (Turner, 1933)
- Mimobrachyoma campylosema (Turner, 1944)
- Mimobrachyoma cosmanthes (Meyrick, 1889)
- Mimobrachyoma eusema (Lower, 1900)
- Mimobrachyoma gonosema (Meyrick, 1888)
- Mimobrachyoma hilaropa (Meyrick, 1889)
- Mimobrachyoma lychnosema (Meyrick, 1886)
- Mimobrachyoma maculifera (Lower, 1899)
- Mimobrachyoma meselectra (Meyrick, 1902)
- Mimobrachyoma ophthalmias (Meyrick, 1888)
- Mimobrachyoma optalea (Meyrick, 1902)
- Mimobrachyoma protadelpha (Meyrick, 1889)
- Mimobrachyoma pseudopis (Meyrick, 1920)
- Mimobrachyoma sulfurea (Meyrick, 1886)
- Nemepeira basatra (Lower, 1900)
- Nemepeira centrotherma (Lower, 1901)
- Nemepeira punicea (Turner, 1938)
- Nemepeira pyrocentra (Lower, 1897)
- Ochlogenes advectella Walker, 1864
- Oenochroa atradelpha (Lower, 1903)
- Oenochroa cimmeriella (Meyrick, 1883)
- Oenochroa cosmosticha (Turner, 1937)
- Oenochroa dinosema Meyrick, 1889
- Oenochroa dystena Turner, 1935
- Oenochroa egregia (Turner, 1937)
- Oenochroa endochlora Meyrick, 1883
- Oenochroa epiconia (Turner, 1936)
- Oenochroa gnophodes Turner, 1896
- Oenochroa homora Meyrick, 1902
- Oenochroa iobaphes Meyrick, 1883
- Oenochroa lactella (Walker, 1864)
- Oenochroa lechriomochla (Turner, 1933)
- Oenochroa lepida Turner, 1935
- Oenochroa mesozona (Lower, 1903)
- Oenochroa molybdoptera Turner, 1935
- Oenochroa ochrosoma Turner, 1896
- Oenochroa phaeobaphes (Turner, 1933)
- Oenochroa picimacula (Turner, 1938)
- Oenochroa serrulifera (Turner, 1933)
- Oenochroa suffulva Turner, 1935
- Oenochroa tacita (Turner, 1927)
- Oenochroa thermistis (Lower, 1896)
- Orescoa orites (Turner, 1941)
- Orescoa paurogramma (Meyrick, 1883)
- Pauronota thermaloma Lower, 1901
- Pholeutis aprepta Turner, 1947
- Pholeutis holoxytha Meyrick, 1915
- Pholeutis leucoprepta Turner, 1947
- Pholeutis neolecta Meyrick, 1906
- Pholeutis suffusca (Turner, 1919)
- Phyzanica pelogenes (Meyrick, 1906)
- Phyzanica tapinopa Turner, 1917
- Teerahna regifica T. P. Lucas, 1901
- Trachyxysta antichroma Meyrick, 1902
- Woorda aquosa T. P. Lucas, 1901
- Wullaburra nigromedia T. P. Lucas, 1901

The following species belongs to the subfamily Praydinae, but have not been assigned to a genus yet. Given here is the original name given to the species when it was first described:

- Philobota carinaria Meyrick, 1913
- Eulechria celata Meyrick, 1913
- Eulechria centroleuca Turner, 1938
- Saropla glagoessa Turner, 1944
- Philobota hemeris Meyrick, 1915
- Coesyra hemiphragma Meyrick, 1889
- Saropla hemixantha Turner, 1939
- Machimia homopolia Turner, 1946
- Eulechria homoteles Meyrick, 1888
- Philobota isomora Turner, 1915
- Chezala liopa Turner, 1927
- Eulechria pelina Turner, 1938
- Eulechria pelodora Meyrick, 1888
- Eulechria sciaphila Turner, 1927
- Eulechria tanysticha Turner, 1937

== Stathmopodinae ==
- Actinoscelis astricta Turner, 1923
- Aeoloscelis chrysophoenicea Meyrick, 1897
- Aeoloscelis hipparcha Meyrick, 1897
- Aeoloscelis pachyceros Turner, 1941
- Aeoloscelis sphragidota Meyrick, 1897
- Aeoloscelis thiostola Turner, 1923
- Calicotis crucifera Meyrick, 1889
- Calicotis microgalopsis Lower, 1904
- Calicotis sialota Turner, 1917
- Calicotis triploesta Turner, 1923
- Coracistis erythrocosma Meyrick, 1897
- Dolophrosynella balteata (Durrant, 1919)
- Ethirastis sideraula (Meyrick, 1915)
- Hieromantis albata (Meyrick, 1913)
- Hieromantis ephodophora Meyrick, 1897
- Idioglossa metallochrysa Turner, 1917
- Molybdurga metallophora Meyrick, 1897
- Mylocera tenebrifera Turner, 1898
- Pachyrhabda acroscia Turner, 1941
- Pachyrhabda adela Turner, 1923
- Pachyrhabda antinoma Meyrick, 1910
- Pachyrhabda argyritis Turner, 1941
- Pachyrhabda bacterias Meyrick, 1913
- Pachyrhabda campylosticha Turner, 1941
- Pachyrhabda capnoscia Turner, 1923
- Pachyrhabda hygrophaes Turner, 1923
- Pachyrhabda liriopis Turner, 1941
- Pachyrhabda punctifera Turner, 1941
- Pachyrhabda steropodes Meyrick, 1897
- Pachyrhabda xanthoscia Turner, 1923
- Pseudaegeria hyalina Turner, 1913
- Pseudaegeria phlogina Turner, 1941
- Pseudaegeria polytita Turner, 1913
- Pseudaegeria squamicornis (R. Felder & Rogenhofer, 1875)
- Snellenia capnora Turner, 1913
- Snellenia flavipennis (R. Felder & Rogenhofer, 1875)
- Snellenia hylaea Turner, 1913
- Snellenia lineata (Walker, 1856)
- Snellenia miltocrossa Turner, 1923
- Stathmopoda acontias Meyrick, 1897
- Stathmopoda amathodes Turner, 1941
- Stathmopoda aphanosema Turner, 1923
- Stathmopoda arachnophthora Turner, 1917
- Stathmopoda astrapeis Meyrick, 1897
- Stathmopoda basixantha Turner, 1917
- Stathmopoda bathrodelta Meyrick, 1921
- Stathmopoda callichrysa Lower, 1893
- Stathmopoda canonica Meyrick, 1897
- Stathmopoda castanodes Turner, 1941
- Stathmopoda cephalaea Meyrick, 1897
- Stathmopoda ceramoptila Turner, 1923
- Stathmopoda chalcotypa Meyrick, 1897
- Stathmopoda chalybeis Meyrick, 1897
- Stathmopoda citroptila Turner, 1941
- Stathmopoda crocophanes Meyrick, 1897
- Stathmopoda cyanopla Meyrick, 1897
- Stathmopoda desmoteles Meyrick, 1897
- Stathmopoda diclidias Meyrick, 1921
- Stathmopoda dimochla Turner, 1941
- Stathmopoda doratias Meyrick, 1897
- Stathmopoda effossa Meyrick, 1921
- Stathmopoda euzona (Turner, 1926)
- Stathmopoda grammatopis Meyrick, 1921
- Stathmopoda holobapta Lower, 1904
- Stathmopoda hyposcia Meyrick, 1897
- Stathmopoda iodes Meyrick, 1897
- Stathmopoda ischnotis Meyrick, 1897
- Stathmopoda isoclera (Meyrick, 1897)
- Stathmopoda lethonoa Meyrick, 1897
- Stathmopoda liporrhoa Meyrick, 1897
- Stathmopoda mannophora Turner, 1900
- Stathmopoda marmarosticha Turner, 1941
- Stathmopoda megathyma Meyrick, 1897
- Stathmopoda melanochra Meyrick, 1897
- Stathmopoda mesombra Meyrick, 1897
- Stathmopoda metopias Meyrick, 1920
- Stathmopoda mimantha Meyrick, 1913
- Stathmopoda nephocentra Meyrick, 1921
- Stathmopoda nitida Meyrick, 1913
- Stathmopoda notosticha Turner, 1941
- Stathmopoda nympheuteria Turner, 1941
- Stathmopoda ochrochyta (Turner, 1926)
- Stathmopoda pampolia Turner, 1923
- Stathmopoda pantarches Meyrick, 1897
- Stathmopoda platynipha Turner, 1923
- Stathmopoda ptycholampra Turner, 1941
- Stathmopoda recondita Turner, 1941
- Stathmopoda rhodocosma Turner, 1941
- Stathmopoda rhythmota Meyrick, 1920
- Stathmopoda rubripicta Meyrick, 1921
- Stathmopoda sentica (Lower, 1899)
- Stathmopoda sphendonita Meyrick, 1921
- Stathmopoda trichopeda Lower, 1904
- Stathmopoda trifida Meyrick, 1921
- Stathmopoda trimochla Turner, 1941
- Stathmopoda triselena Meyrick, 1897
- Stathmopoda tritophaea Turner, 1917
- Stathmopoda xanthocrana Turner, 1933
- Stathmopoda xanthoma Meyrick, 1897
- Stathmopoda zalodes Meyrick, 1913
- Stathmopoda zophoptila Turner, 1941
- Trychnopepla discors Turner, 1941
- Zatrichodes horrifica Meyrick, 1922

== Xyloryctinae ==
- Araeostoma aenicta Turner, 1917
- Arignota stercorata (T.P. Lucas, 1894)
- Athrotaxivora tasmanica McQuillan, 1998
- Bassarodes siriaca Meyrick, 1910
- Bathydoxa euxesta Turner, 1935
- Bida radiosella (Walker, 1863)
- Boydia criniferella Newman, 1856
- Boydia stenadelpha (Lower, 1905)
- Brachybelistis blackburnii (Lower, 1892)
- Brachybelistis neomorpha (Turner, 1898)
- Brachybelistis pentachroa (Lower, 1901)
- Catoryctis eugramma Meyrick, 1890
- Catoryctis leucomerata (Lower, 1893)
- Catoryctis mediolinea T.P. Lucas, 1894
- Catoryctis nonolinea T.P. Lucas, 1894
- Catoryctis perichalca Lower, 1923
- Catoryctis polysticha Lower, 1893
- Catoryctis sciastis (Meyrick, 1915)
- Catoryctis subnexella (Walker, 1864)
- Catoryctis subparallela (Walker, 1864)
- Catoryctis tricrena Meyrick, 1890
- Catoryctis truncata T.P. Lucas, 1902
- Chalarotona craspedota Meyrick, 1890
- Chalarotona insincera Meyrick, 1890
- Chalarotona intabescens Meyrick, 1890
- Chalarotona melipnoa Meyrick, 1890
- Chalarotona melitoleuca Meyrick, 1890
- Chereuta anthracistis Meyrick, 1906
- Chereuta chalcistis Meyrick, 1906
- Chereuta tinthalea Meyrick, 1906
- Clerarcha agana Meyrick, 1890
- Clerarcha dryinopa Meyrick, 1890
- Clerarcha grammatistis Meyrick, 1890
- Clerarcha poliochyta Turner, 1902
- Compsotorna eccrita Turner, 1917
- Compsotorna oligarchica Meyrick, 1890
- Copidoris dimorpha Meyrick, 1907
- Crypsicharis enthetica Meyrick, 1922
- Crypsicharis neocosma Meyrick, 1890
- Crypsicharis triplaca Lower, 1923
- Cryptophasa aglaodes (Lower, 1893)
- Cryptophasa albacosta Lewin, 1805
- Cryptophasa alphitodes Turner, 1904
- Cryptophasa argyrias Turner, 1906
- Cryptophasa argyrocolla Turner, 1917
- Cryptophasa atecmarta Turner, 1917
- Cryptophasa balteata (Walker, 1866)
- Cryptophasa bipunctata Scott, 1864
- Cryptophasa blosyra Turner, 1917
- Cryptophasa byssinopis Turner, 1902
- Cryptophasa cannea (T.P. Lucas, 1901)
- Cryptophasa catharia Turner, 1917
- Cryptophasa chionodes (Turner, 1898)
- Cryptophasa citrinopa (Lower, 1915)
- Cryptophasa delocentra (Meyrick, 1890)
- Cryptophasa diplosema (Lower, 1903)
- Cryptophasa ensigera Meyrick, 1925
- Cryptophasa epadelpha (Meyrick, 1890)
- Cryptophasa epixysta Turner, 1917
- Cryptophasa eumorpha (Turner, 1898)
- Cryptophasa flavolineata (Walker, 1864)
- Cryptophasa gypsomera (Lower, 1903)
- Cryptophasa hyalinopa (Lower, 1901)
- Cryptophasa immaculata Scott, 1864
- Cryptophasa insana (R. Felder & Rogenhofer, 1875)
- Cryptophasa irrorata Lewin, 1805
- Cryptophasa isoneura (Lower, 1902)
- Cryptophasa lasiocosma (Lower, 1908)
- Cryptophasa leucadelpha Meyrick, 1887
- Cryptophasa melanoscia (Lower, 1903)
- Cryptophasa molaris (T.P. Lucas, 1900)
- Cryptophasa nephrosema (Turner, 1898)
- Cryptophasa nigricincta (Turner, 1898)
- Cryptophasa nubila (T.P. Lucas, 1894)
- Cryptophasa ochroleuca (Lower, 1892)
- Cryptophasa opalina (Turner, 1900)
- Cryptophasa panleuca (Lower, 1901)
- Cryptophasa phaeochtha Meyrick, 1925
- Cryptophasa phaethontia (Meyrick, 1890)
- Cryptophasa phycidoides (T.P. Lucas, 1901)
- Cryptophasa platypedimela (Lower, 1894)
- Cryptophasa porphyritis Turner, 1906
- Cryptophasa psilocrossa Turner, 1902
- Cryptophasa pultenae Lewin, 1805
- Cryptophasa rubescens Lewin, 1805
- Cryptophasa rubra (Meyrick, 1890)
- Cryptophasa russata Butler, 1877
- Cryptophasa sacerdos Turner, 1902
- Cryptophasa sarcinota (Meyrick, 1890)
- Cryptophasa sceliphrodes Meyrick, 1925
- Cryptophasa spilonota Scott, 1864
- Cryptophasa stenoleuca (Lower, 1894)
- Cryptophasa stochastis (Meyrick, 1890)
- Cryptophasa tecta (T.P. Lucas, 1894)
- Cryptophasa tetrazona (Lower, 1901)
- Cryptophasa themerodes Turner, 1904
- Cryptophasa xylomima Turner, 1906
- Cryptophasa zorodes Turner, 1917
- Echiomima fabulosa Meyrick, 1915
- Echiomima mythica (Meyrick, 1890)
- Echiomima viperina Meyrick, 1915
- Eporycta hiracopis Meyrick, 1921
- Eschatura lactea (Turner, 1898)
- Eschatura lemurias Meyrick, 1897
- Gomphoscopa catoryctopsis (Lower, 1893)
- Gonioma hospita (R. Felder & Rogenhofer, 1875)
- Gonioma hypoxantha (Lower, 1894)
- Heterochyta aprepta (Turner, 1947)
- Heterochyta asteropa Meyrick, 1906
- Heterochyta infesta (Meyrick, 1921)
- Heterochyta pyrotypa Common, 1996
- Heterochyta tetracentra (Meyrick, 1906)
- Heterochyta xenomorpha Meyrick, 1906
- Hylypnes isosticha (Meyrick, 1915)
- Hylypnes leptosticta (Turner, 1947)
- Hylypnes pudica (Lower, 1896)
- Illidgea aethalodes Turner, 1902
- Illidgea epigramma (Meyrick, 1890)
- Iulactis insignis (Meyrick, 1904)
- Iulactis semifusca Meyrick, 1918
- Leistarcha amphigramma (Meyrick, 1915)
- Leistarcha scitissimella (Walker, 1864)
- Leistarcha tenuistria (Turner, 1935)
- Leistarcha thaumastica (Turner, 1946)
- Leptobelistis asemanta Turner, 1902
- Leptobelistis isthmodes (Meyrick, 1922)
- Lichenaula afflictella (Walker, 1864)
- Lichenaula appropinquans T.P. Lucas, 1901
- Lichenaula arisema Meyrick, 1890
- Lichenaula calligrapha Meyrick, 1890
- Lichenaula callispora Turner, 1904
- Lichenaula choriodes Meyrick, 1890
- Lichenaula circumsignata T.P. Lucas, 1900
- Lichenaula comparella (Walker, 1864)
- Lichenaula drosias Lower, 1899
- Lichenaula fumata Turner, 1898
- Lichenaula goniodes Turner, 1898
- Lichenaula ignota Turner, 1898
- Lichenaula laniata Meyrick, 1890
- Lichenaula lichenea Meyrick, 1890
- Lichenaula lithina Meyrick, 1890
- Lichenaula maculosa (Turner, 1898)
- Lichenaula melanoleuca Turner, 1898
- Lichenaula mochlias Meyrick, 1890
- Lichenaula musica Meyrick, 1890
- Lichenaula onychodes Turner, 1898
- Lichenaula onychotypa Turner, 1939
- Lichenaula pelodesma (Lower, 1899)
- Lichenaula petulans T.P. Lucas, 1900
- Lichenaula phloeochroa Turner, 1898
- Lichenaula selenophora Lower, 1892
- Lichenaula tholodes Turner, 1900
- Lichenaula tortriciformis T.P. Lucas, 1900
- Lichenaula tuberculata Meyrick, 1890
- Lichenaula undulatella (Walker, 1864)
- Liparistis lioxera Meyrick, 1915
- Liparistis monosema (Lower, 1893)
- Lophobela sinuosa Turner, 1917
- Maroga leptopasta Turner, 1917
- Maroga melanostigma (Wallengren, 1861)
- Maroga paragypsa Lower, 1901
- Maroga sericodes Meyrick, 1915
- Maroga setiotricha Meyrick, 1890
- Paralecta tinctoria (T.P. Lucas, 1894)
- Perixestis eucephala (Turner, 1902)
- Perixestis rhizophaga (Turner, 1902)
- Philarista porphyrinella (Walker, 1864)
- Phthonerodes peridela Common, 1964
- Phthonerodes scotarcha Meyrick, 1890
- Pilostibes basivitta (Walker, 1864)
- Pilostibes embroneta Turner, 1902
- Pilostibes serpta T.P. Lucas, 1901
- Pilostibes stigmatias Meyrick, 1890
- Plectophila acrochroa (Turner, 1900)
- Plectophila discalis (Walker, 1865)
- Plectophila electella (Walker, 1864)
- Plectophila eucrines (Turner, 1898)
- Plectophila micradelpha (Turner, 1898)
- Plectophila placocosma Lower, 1893
- Plectophila pyrgodes Turner, 1898
- Plectophila sarculata T.P. Lucas, 1901
- Plectophila thiophanes (Turner, 1917)
- Plectophila thrasycosma (Meyrick, 1915)
- Potniarcha hierastis (Meyrick, 1890)
- Scieropepla acrates Meyrick, 1890
- Scieropepla argoloma Lower, 1897
- Scieropepla ceramochroa (Turner, 1919)
- Scieropepla hapalyntis (Meyrick, 1911)
- Scieropepla liophanes Meyrick, 1890
- Scieropepla megadelpha Lower, 1899
- Scieropepla monoides Turner, 1906
- Scieropepla obfuscata (Meyrick, 1921)
- Scieropepla orthosema (Lower, 1893)
- Scieropepla oxyptera Meyrick, 1890
- Scieropepla photinodes Lower, 1897
- Scieropepla polioleuca (Turner, 1919)
- Scieropepla polyxesta Meyrick, 1890
- Scieropepla reversella (Walker, 1864)
- Scieropepla rimata Meyrick, 1890
- Scieropepla serica (Turner, 1944)
- Scieropepla serina Meyrick, 1890
- Scieropepla trinervis (Meyrick, 1904)
- Scieropepla typhicola Meyrick, 1885
- Sphalerostola epierana (Turner, 1947)
- Telecrates basileia (Turner, 1902)
- Telecrates desmochrysa Lower, 1896
- Telecrates laetiorella (Walker, 1864)
- Telecrates melanochrysa (Turner, 1939)
- Thymiatris allocrossa (Turner, 1902)
- Thymiatris cephalochra (Lower, 1894)
- Thysiarcha ecclesiastis (Meyrick, 1887)
- Tymbophora peltastis Meyrick, 1890
- Uzucha borealis Turner, 1898
- Uzucha humeralis Walker, 1864
- Xerocrates proleuca (Meyrick, 1890)
- Xylodryadella cryeranthes (Meyrick, 1925)
- Xylomimetes scholastis Turner, 1916
- Xylomimetes trachyptera (Turner, 1900)
- Xylorycta amaloptis Lower, 1915
- Xylorycta amblygona (Turner, 1900)
- Xylorycta amphileuca Lower, 1902
- Xylorycta apheles (Turner, 1898)
- Xylorycta argentella (Walker, 1864)
- Xylorycta argyrota Lower, 1908
- Xylorycta assimilis Turner, 1900
- Xylorycta austera T.P. Lucas, 1898
- Xylorycta bipunctella (Walker, 1864)
- Xylorycta calligramma (Meyrick, 1890)
- Xylorycta candescens Lower, 1896
- Xylorycta castanea (Turner, 1902)
- Xylorycta ceratospila Meyrick, 1915
- Xylorycta chionoptera Lower, 1893
- Xylorycta chrysomela Lower, 1897
- Xylorycta cirrhophragma Meyrick, 1921
- Xylorycta conistica Turner, 1917
- Xylorycta corticana T.P. Lucas, 1901
- Xylorycta cosmeta Turner, 1917
- Xylorycta cosmopis Meyrick, 1890
- Xylorycta cygnella (Walker, 1864)
- Xylorycta emarginata (T.P. Lucas, 1900)
- Xylorycta flavicosta (T.P. Lucas, 1894)
- Xylorycta haplochroa (Turner, 1898)
- Xylorycta heliomacula (Lower, 1894)
- Xylorycta homoleuca Lower, 1894
- Xylorycta leucophanes Lower, 1892
- Xylorycta luteotactella (Walker, 1864)
- Xylorycta maeandria Meyrick, 1915
- Xylorycta melaleucae Turner, 1898
- Xylorycta melanias Lower, 1899
- Xylorycta melanula (Meyrick, 1890)
- Xylorycta micracma (Meyrick, 1890)
- Xylorycta moligera (Meyrick, 1914)
- Xylorycta molybdina Turner, 1898
- Xylorycta nivella (Walker, 1864)
- Xylorycta ophiogramma Meyrick, 1890
- Xylorycta orectis Meyrick, 1890
- Xylorycta parabolella (Walker, 1864)
- Xylorycta parthenistis Lower, 1902
- Xylorycta perflua Meyrick, 1914
- Xylorycta philonympha Lower, 1903
- Xylorycta placidella (Walker, 1864)
- Xylorycta polysticha Turner, 1939
- Xylorycta sigmophora Lower, 1894
- Xylorycta stereodesma Lower, 1902
- Xylorycta streptogramma (Lower, 1903)
- Xylorycta strigata (Lewin, 1805)
- Xylorycta sucina Turner, 1939
- Xylorycta synaula Meyrick, 1890
- Xylorycta tapeina Turner, 1898
- Xylorycta tignaria Meyrick, 1921
- Zaphanaula hemileuca (Turner, 1896)
- Zauclophora pelodes Turner, 1900
- Zauclophora procellosa (T.P. Lucas, 1901)

== Stenomatinae ==
- Agriophara atratella (Walker, 1866)
- Agriophara axesta Meyrick, 1890
- Agriophara capnodes Meyrick, 1890
- Agriophara cinderella (Newman, 1856)
- Agriophara cinerosa Rosenstock, 1885
- Agriophara confertella (Walker, 1864)
- Agriophara cremnopis Lower, 1894
- Agriophara curta T.P. Lucas, 1900
- Agriophara diminuta Rosenstock, 1885
- Agriophara discobola Turner, 1898
- Agriophara dyscapna Turner, 1917
- Agriophara fascifera Meyrick, 1890
- Agriophara gravis Meyrick, 1890
- Agriophara horridula Meyrick, 1890
- Agriophara hyalinota Lower, 1899
- Agriophara leptosemela Lower, 1893
- Agriophara leucanthes Turner, 1898
- Agriophara leucosta Lower, 1893
- Agriophara levis Meyrick, 1921
- Agriophara murinella (Walker, 1864)
- Agriophara neoxanta Meyrick, 1915
- Agriophara nodigera Turner, 1900
- Agriophara plagiosema Turner, 1898
- Agriophara platyscia Lower, 1908
- Agriophara poliopepla Turner, 1898
- Agriophara polistis (Lower, 1923)
- Agriophara tephroptera Lower, 1903
- Agriophara velitata (T.P. Lucas, 1900)
- Aproopta melanchlaena Turner, 1919
- Eriogenes cossoides (Butler, 1882)
- Eriogenes mesogypsa Meyrick, 1925
- Eriogenes nielseni Edwards, 2003
- Phylomictis decretoria T.P. Lucas, 1900
- Phylomictis eclecta Turner, 1906
- Phylomictis idiotricha Meyrick, 1921
- Phylomictis leucopelta (Lower, 1902)
- Phylomictis lintearia Meyrick, 1921
- Phylomictis maligna Meyrick, 1890
- Phylomictis monochroma Lower, 1892
- Phylomictis palaeomorpha Turner, 1898
- Phylomictis sarcinopa Meyrick, 1920

== Autostichinae ==
- Anaptilora basiphaea Turner, 1919
- Anaptilora ephelotis Meyrick, 1916
- Anaptilora eremias Meyrick, 1904
- Anaptilora haplospila Turner, 1919
- Anaptilora homoclera Meyrick, 1916
- Anaptilora isocosma Meyrick, 1904
- Anaptilora parasira Meyrick, 1916
- Autosticha symmetra (Turner, 1919)
- Procometis aplegiopa Turner, 1904
- Procometis bisulcata Meyrick, 1890
- Procometis coniochersa Meyrick, 1922
- Procometis diplocentra Meyrick, 1890
- Procometis genialis Meyrick, 1890
- Procometis hylonoma Meyrick, 1890
- Procometis lipara Meyrick, 1890
- Procometis melanthes Turner, 1898
- Procometis monocalama Meyrick, 1890
- Procometis periscia Lower, 1903
- Procometis phloeodes Turner, 1898
- Procometis stenarga Turner, 1902
- Syndesmica homogenes Turner, 1919
- Trichloma asbolophora Lower, 1902

== Unplaced to Subfamily ==
- Callithauma basilica Turner, 1900
- Callithauma callianthes (Meyrick, 1889)
- Callithauma glycera Turner, 1916
- Callithauma leptodoma Turner, 1916
- Callithauma miniatula Turner, 1946
- Callithauma pyrites (Turner, 1896)
- Pytinaea anticrossa (Meyrick, 1915)
- Pytinaea pytinaea (Meyrick, 1902)
- Pytinaea schistopa (Meyrick, 1902)
- Sphaleropis adelphodes (Lower, 1893)
- Sphaleropis sphaleropis (Meyrick, 1902)
