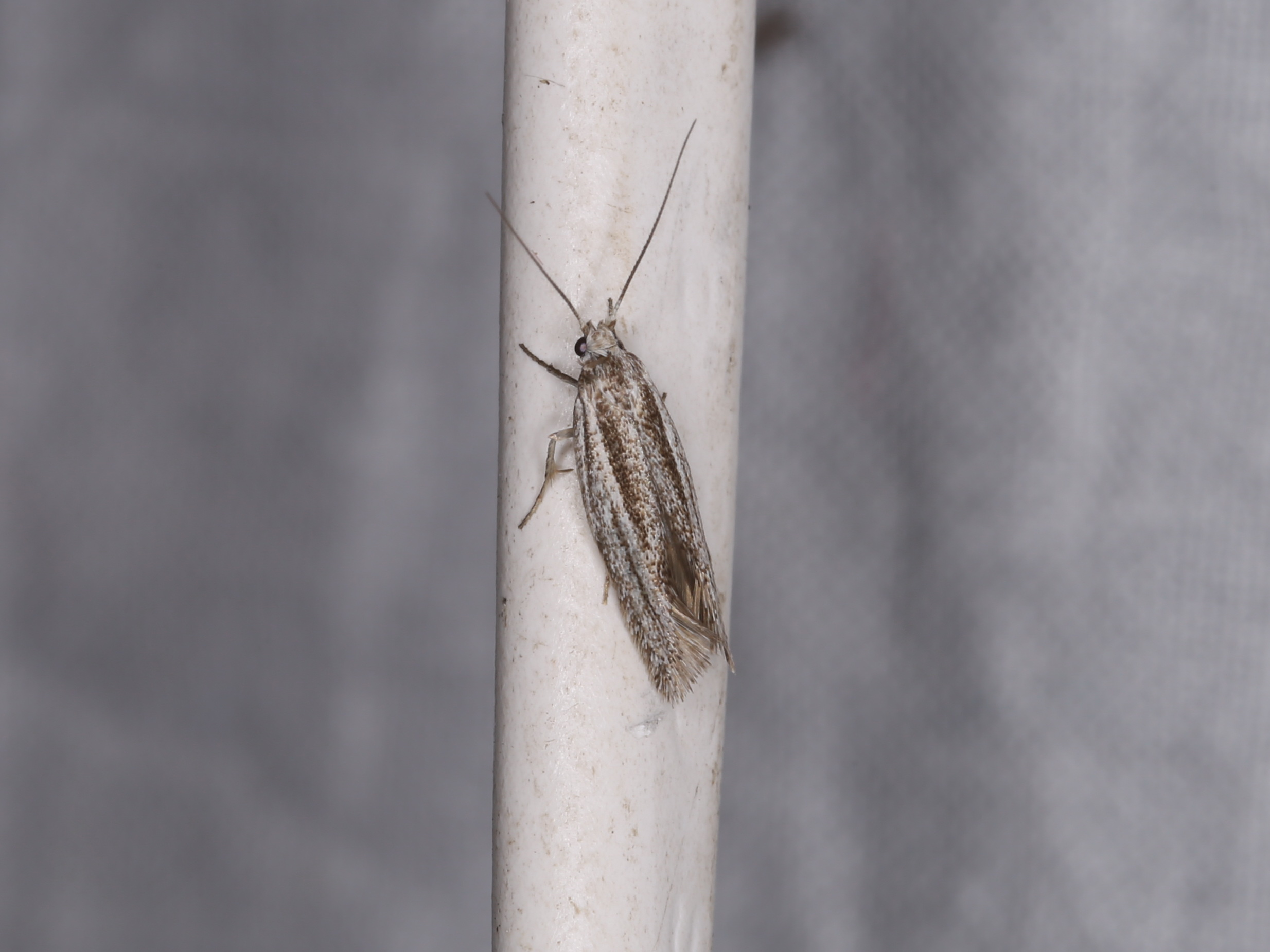
- Antipterna ptychomochla

Scientific classification
- Kingdom: Animalia
- Phylum: Arthropoda
- Class: Insecta
- Order: Lepidoptera
- Family: Oecophoridae
- Subfamily: Oecophorinae
- Genus: Antipterna; Meyrick, 1916

Type species
- Antipterna glacialis (Meyrick, 1885)

= Antipterna =

Genus of moths

Antipterna is a genus of moths of the family Oecophoridae, first described by Edward Meyrick in 1916.

== Species ==
(From IRMNG):

- Antipterna acrobaphes (Meyrick, 1885)
- Antipterna assulosa (Turner, 1940)
- Antipterna diclethra (Meyrick, 1885)
- Antipterna diplosticta (Turner, 1944)
- Antipterna euanthes (Meyrick, 1885)
- Antipterna glacialis (Meyrick, 1885)
- Antipterna hemimelas (Turner, 1940)
- Antipterna homoleuca (Meyrick, 1885)
- Antipterna homopasta (Turner, 1932)
- Antipterna lithophanes (Meyrick, 1885)
- Antipterna microphanes Lower, 1902
- Antipterna monostropha (Meyrick, 1885)
- Antipterna naias (Meyrick, 1902)
- Antipterna nivea (Turner, 1940)
- Antipterna panarga (Turner, 1932)
- Antipterna ptychomochla Turner, 1940
- Antipterna spathulata (Turner, 1944)
- Antipterna stichoptis (Lower, 1915)
- Antipterna tephrodes Lower, 1902
- Antipterna trilicella (Meyrick, 1885)
