= Antipterna homoleuca =

Scientific classification
- Kingdom: Animalia
- Phylum: Arthropoda
- Class: Insecta
- Order: Lepidoptera
- Family: Oecophoridae
- Genus: Antipterna
- Species: A. homoleuca

Binomial name
- Antipterna homoleuca (Meyrick, 1885)

Synonyms
- Ocystola homoleuca Meyrick, 1885; Ocystola argophanes Turner, 1940

Species of moth

Antipterna homoleuca is a species of moth in the family Oecophoridae, first described by Edward Meyrick in 1885 as Ocystola homoleuca. The lectotype for Ocystola homoleuca was collected at Wirrabara, South Australia, while that for Ocystola argophanes was collected in Brisbane, Queensland.

== Meyrick's description ==
Male & female: 10-15 mm. Head and thorax white, faintly ochreous-tinged. Palpi white, anterior edge somewhat grey, terminal joint ⅔ of second. Antennae whitish, ciliations 5. Abdomen ochreous-whitish. Legs dark grey, posterior pair ochreous-whitish. Forewings elongate, narrow, costa moderately arched, apex acute, hindmargin extremely obliquely rounded; shining white; inner margin narrowly and slightly tinged with greyish-ochreous: cilia white, on anal angle somewhat greyish-ochreous. Hindwings broad-lanceolate, acute, veins 3 and 4 from a point or very slightly remote; light grey; cilia ochreous-grey-whitish.

Closely allied to 0. monostropha, but always smaller, with the thorax white, the grey suffusion of forewings hardly perceptible, and veins 3 and 4 of the hindwings hardly or not remote.

Sydney and Bathurst (2300 feet). New South Wales; Wirrabara Forest, South Australia; six specimens in October and November.
