= Antipterna naias =

Scientific classification
- Kingdom: Animalia
- Phylum: Arthropoda
- Class: Insecta
- Order: Lepidoptera
- Family: Oecophoridae
- Genus: Antipterna
- Species: A. naias

Binomial name
- Antipterna naias (Meyrick, 1902)

Synonyms
- Machaeritis naias Meyrick, 1902; Ocystola paralia Lower, 1903

Species of moths

Antipterna naias is a species of moth in the family Oecophoridae, first described by Edward Meyrick in 1902 as Machaeritis naias. The male holotype for Machaeritis naias was collected on Mount Crackenback, New South Wales. The male holotype for Ocystola paralia was collected at Brighton, Victoria.
