= Antipterna homopasta =

Scientific classification
- Kingdom: Animalia
- Phylum: Arthropoda
- Class: Insecta
- Order: Lepidoptera
- Family: Oecophoridae
- Genus: Antipterna
- Species: A. homopasta

Binomial name
- Antipterna homopasta (Turner, 1932)

Synonyms
- Periallactis homopasta Turner, 1932

Species of moth

Antipterna homopasta is a species of moth in the family Oecophoridae, first described by Alfred Jefferis Turner in 1932 as Periallactis homopasta. The species epithet, homopasta, derives from the Greek, όμοπαστος ("uniformly sprinkled"). The male holotype for Periallactis homopasta was collected at Crows Nest in Queensland.
