= Antipterna diclethra =

Scientific classification
- Kingdom: Animalia
- Phylum: Arthropoda
- Class: Insecta
- Order: Lepidoptera
- Family: Oecophoridae
- Genus: Antipterna
- Species: A. diclethra

Binomial name
- Antipterna diclethra (Meyrick, 1885)

Synonyms
- Ocystola diclethra Meyrick, 1885 Machaeretis niphoessa Turner, 1940

Species of moth

Antipterna diclethra is a species of moth in the family Oecophoridae, first described by Edward Meyrick in 1885 as Ocystola diclethra. Lectotypes for both Ocystola diclethra and Machaeretis niphoessa were both collected in greater Sydney, New South Wales.

== Meyrick's description ==
Male & Female: 10-13 mm. Head, palpi, antennae, and thorax white; second joint of palpi externally grey on lower half, terminal joint ⅔ of second; antennal ciliations 2½. Abdomen light grey. Legs dark grey, posterior pair ochreous-whitish. Forewings elongate, narrow, costa gently arched, apex acute, hindmargin slightly sinuate, extremely oblique; snow-white; markings bright yellow-ochreous, more or less irrorated with dark fuscous; two small round generally confluent spots transversly placed in disc before middle, lower slightly anterior; a rather narrow fascia from ⅔ of costa to ¾ of inner margin, narrowly produced along inner margin to beneath anterior spots, and more broadly along costa to near apex, and connected below middle by a short slender bar with anal angle: cilia ochreous-whitish, suffused with ochreous and sometimes irrorated with dark fuscous between apex and anal angle. Hind-wings lanceolate, acute, veins 3 and 4 somewhat remote; light grey; cilia very pale greyish-ochreous.
Sydney, New South Wales; not uncommon from October to December.
