= Antipterna nivea =

Scientific classification
- Kingdom: Animalia
- Phylum: Arthropoda
- Class: Insecta
- Order: Lepidoptera
- Family: Oecophoridae
- Genus: Antipterna
- Species: A. nivea

Binomial name
- Antipterna nivea (Turner, 1940)

Synonyms
- Ocystola nivea Turner, 1940

Species of moth

Antipterna nivea is a species of moth in the family Oecophoridae, first described by Alfred Jefferis Turner in 1940 as Ocystola nivea. The species epithet, nivea, derives from the Latin adjective, niveus ("snow-white"). The male lectotype for Ocystola nivea was collected at Warwick in Queensland.
