= Antipterna spathulata =

Scientific classification
- Kingdom: Animalia
- Phylum: Arthropoda
- Class: Insecta
- Order: Lepidoptera
- Family: Oecophoridae
- Genus: Antipterna
- Species: A. spathulata

Binomial name
- Antipterna spathulata (Turner, 1944)

Synonyms
- Ocystola spathulata Turner, 1944

Species of moth

Antipterna spathulata is a species of moth in the family Oecophoridae, first described by Alfred Jefferis Turner in 1944 as Ocystola spathulata. The species epithet, spathulata, derives from the Latin, spathulatus ("spoon-shaped"). The male lectotype for Ocystola spathulata was collected at Waroona in Western Australia.
