= Antipterna tephrodes =

Scientific classification
- Kingdom: Animalia
- Phylum: Arthropoda
- Class: Insecta
- Order: Lepidoptera
- Family: Oecophoridae
- Genus: Antipterna
- Species: A. tephrodes

Binomial name
- Antipterna tephrodes (Lower, 1902)

Synonyms
- Ocystola tephrodes Lower, 1902

Species of moth

Antipterna tephrodes is a species of moth in the family Oecophoridae, first described by Oswald Bertram Lower in 1902 as Ocystola tephrodes. The male holotype for Ocystola tephrodes was collected at Stawell in Victoria.
