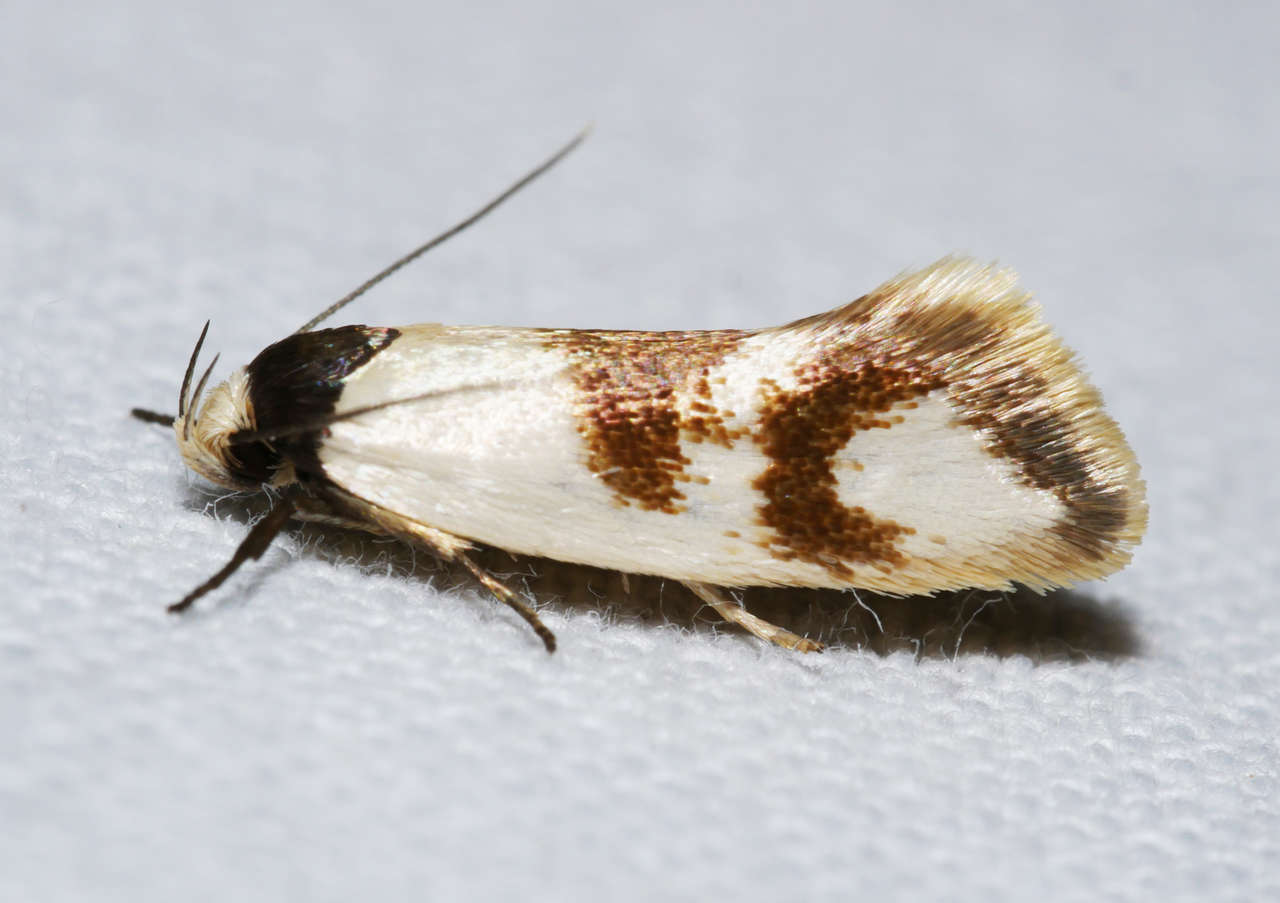

Scientific classification
- Kingdom: Animalia
- Phylum: Arthropoda
- Class: Insecta
- Order: Lepidoptera
- Family: Oecophoridae
- Genus: Antipterna
- Species: A. trilicella

Binomial name
- Antipterna trilicella (Meyrick, 1885)

= Antipterna trilicella =

Species of moth

Antipterna trilicella is a species of moth in the family Oecophoridae, first described by Edward Meyrick in 1885 as Ocystola trilicella. It appears to be a moth endemic to Australia and confined to the east coast, occurring in Victoria, New South Wales and Queensland.

== Meyrick's description ==
Male & Female: 14-18 mm. Head and palpi white, lower half of second joint anteriorly suffused with dark grey, terminal joint ¾ of second. Antennae whitish, ciliations 4. Thorax dark fuscous. Abdomen ochreous-whitish. Legs ochreous-whitish, anterior pair dark fuscous, middle pair suffused with fuscous. Forewings elongate, costa moderately arched, apex roundpointed, hindmargin sinuate, very oblique; white, slightly ochreous-tinged, with ochreous-brown markings; an erect triangular spot on middle of inner margin, reaching more than half across wing, apex sometimes produced obliquely forwards; a moderate inwards-curved fascia from ⅔ of costa to anal angle; an irregular line along hind-margin: cilia ochreous-whitish, basal half ochreous-fuscous. Hind-wings broad-lanceolate, tolerably acute, veins 3 and 4 from a point; light grey; cilia pale whitish-ochreous, round apex greyish-tinged at base.
Sydney and Blackheath (3500 feet), New South Wales; four specimens, in September, December, and January.
