= Antipterna lithophanes =

Scientific classification
- Kingdom: Animalia
- Phylum: Arthropoda
- Class: Insecta
- Order: Lepidoptera
- Family: Oecophoridae
- Genus: Antipterna
- Species: A. lithophanes

Binomial name
- Antipterna lithophanes (Meyrick, 1885)

Synonyms
- Ocystola lithophanes Meyrick, 1885; Ocystola linoleuca Turner, 1940; Philobota chionoleuca Turner, 1944; Philobota notomolybda Turner, 1944

Species of moth

Antipterna lithophanes is a species of moth in the family Oecophoridae, first described by Edward Meyrick in 1885 as Ocystola lithophanes. The lectotype for Ocystola lithophanes was collected at Deloraine, Tasmania. Holotypes for Alfred Jefferis Turner's synonyms were collected from Queensland and New South Wales.

Occurrence data from GBIF shows A. lithophanes occurring in Victoria, and New South Wales.

== Meyrick's description ==
Male & female: 18-19 mm. Head grey-whitish, crown more or less grey. Palpi grey, apex of second joint white, terminal joint ⅔ of second. Antennae, thorax, abdomen, and legs grey; antennal ciliations 4; posterior legs grey-whitish. Forewings elongate, narrow, costa gently arched, apex round-pointed, hindmargin extremely obliquely rounded; shining grey; costa suffused with ochreous-white, in male forming a definite moderate streak: cilia whitish-grey. Hindwings broad-lanceolate, round-pointed, veins 3 and 4 from a point; grey; cilia light grey.
Deloraine, Tasmania; two specimens in November.
