= Antipterna diplosticta =

Scientific classification
- Kingdom: Animalia
- Phylum: Arthropoda
- Class: Insecta
- Order: Lepidoptera
- Family: Oecophoridae
- Genus: Antipterna
- Species: A. diplosticta

Binomial name
- Antipterna diplosticta (Turner, 1944)

Synonyms
- Ocystola diplosticta Turner, 1944

Species of moth

Antipterna diplosticta is a species of moth in the family Oecophoridae, first described by Alfred Jefferis Turner in 1944 as Ocystola diplosticta. The species epithet, diplosticta, derives from the Greek, διπλοστικτος ("two spotted"). The male holotype for Ocystola diplosticta was collected at Gladstone in Queensland.
