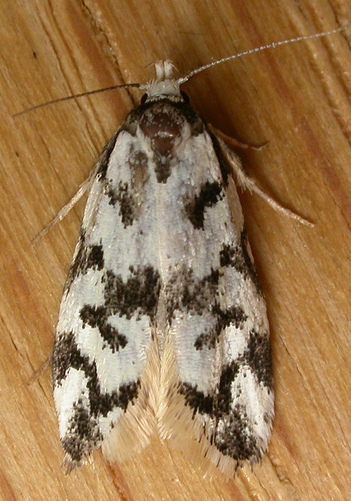

Scientific classification
- Kingdom: Animalia
- Phylum: Arthropoda
- Class: Insecta
- Order: Lepidoptera
- Family: Oecophoridae
- Genus: Cosmaresta
- Species: C. charaxias

Binomial name
- Cosmaresta charaxias Meyrick, 1889

= Cosmaresta charaxias =

Species of moth

Cosmaresta charaxias is a moth of the family Oecophoridae. It is found in Australia.
