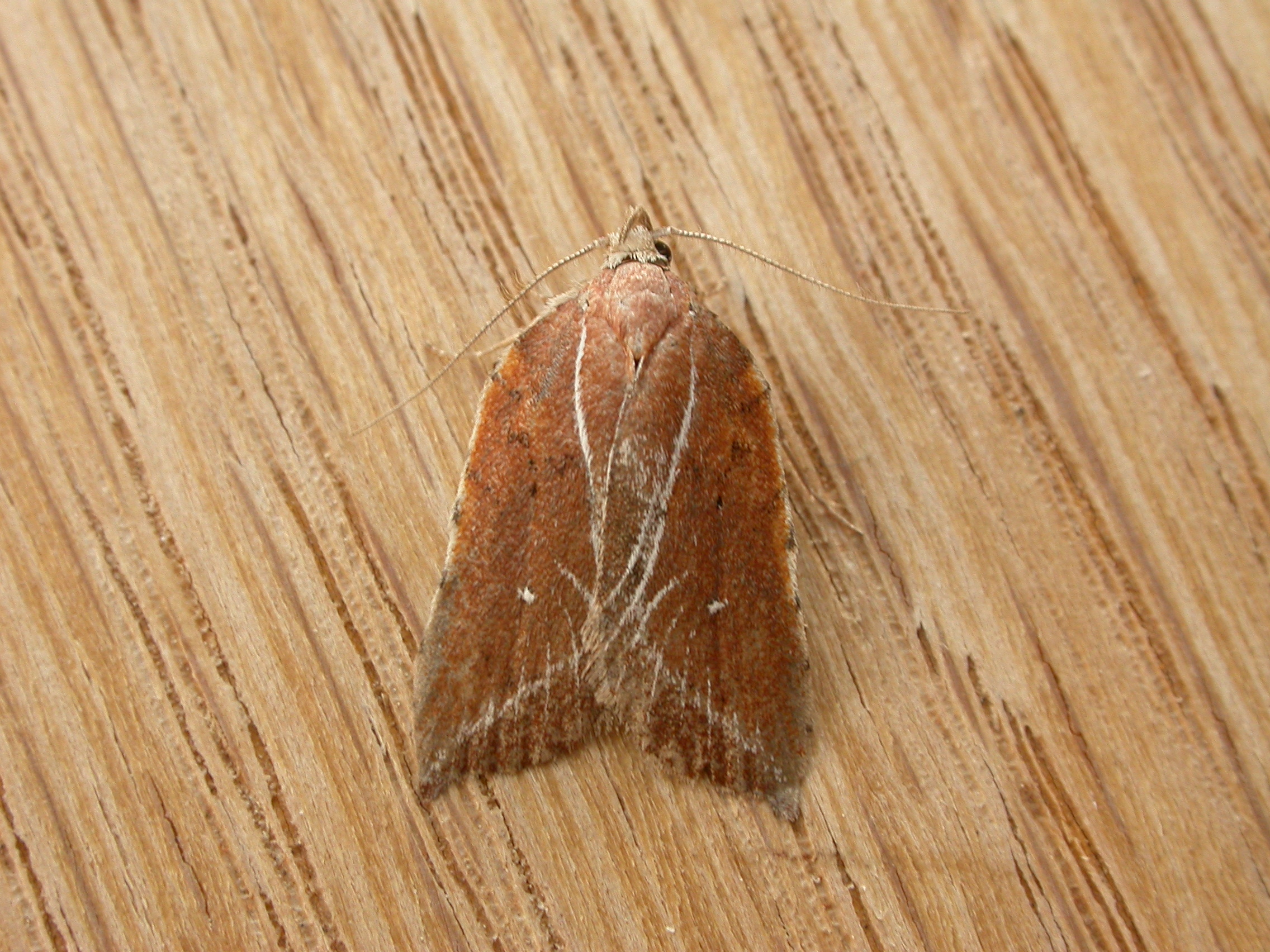

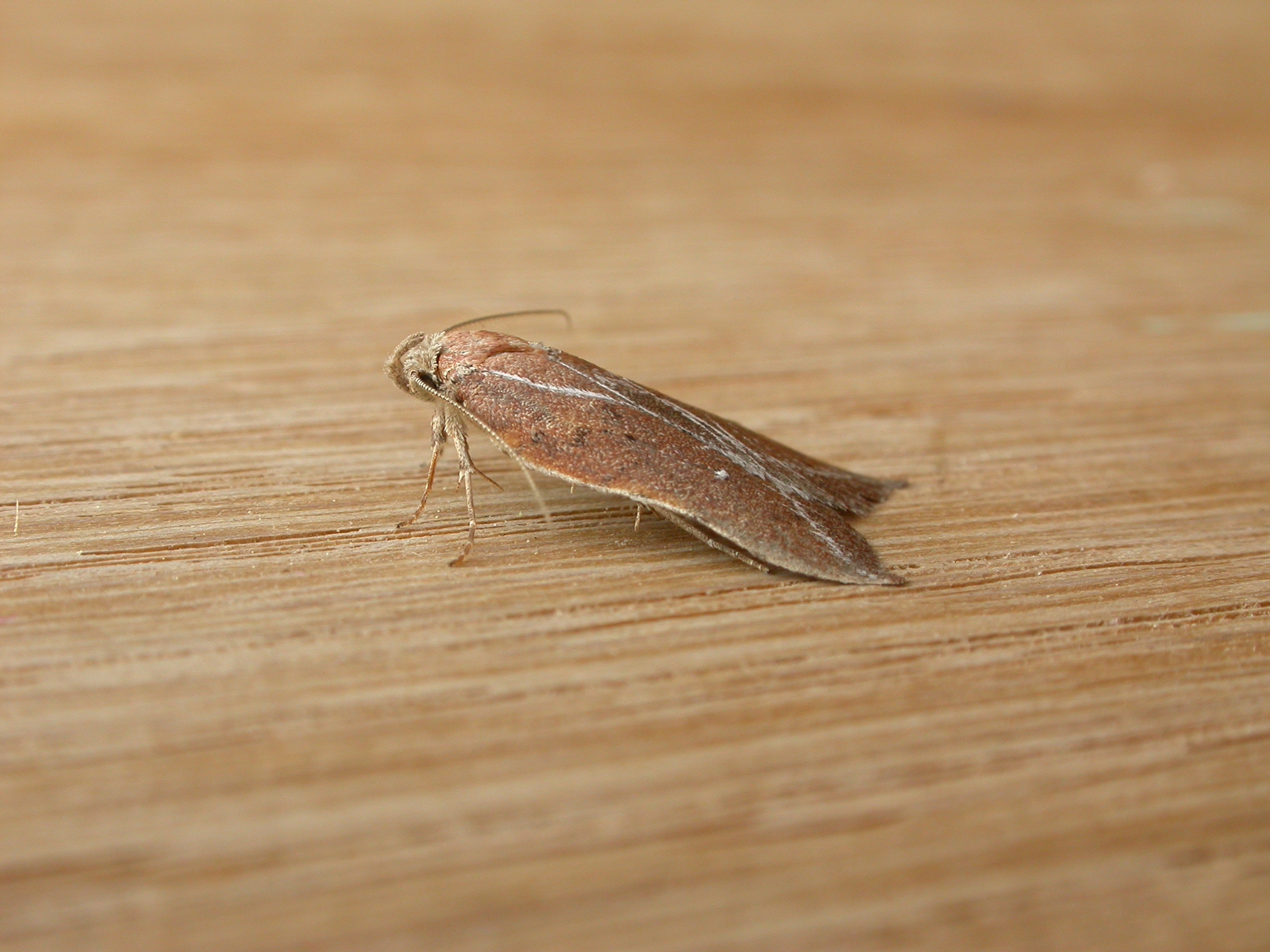

Scientific classification
- Kingdom: Animalia
- Phylum: Arthropoda
- Clade: Pancrustacea
- Class: Insecta
- Order: Lepidoptera
- Family: Oecophoridae
- Genus: Arachnographa
- Species: A. micrastrella

Binomial name
- Arachnographa micrastrella (Meyrick, 1883)

Synonyms
- Palparia micrastrella Meyrick, 1883; Colpoloma fraxinea Turner, 1946

= Arachnographa micrastrella =

Species of moth

Arachnographa micrastrella is a moth of the family Oecophoridae. It is found in New South Wales, Queensland and Victoria.
