= Antipterna panarga =

Scientific classification
- Kingdom: Animalia
- Phylum: Arthropoda
- Class: Insecta
- Order: Lepidoptera
- Family: Oecophoridae
- Genus: Antipterna
- Species: A. panarga

Binomial name
- Antipterna panarga (Turner, 1932)

Synonyms
- Periallactis panarga Turner, 1932

Species of moth

Antipterna panarga is a species of moth in the family Oecophoridae, first described by Alfred Jefferis Turner in 1932 as Periallactis panarga. The species epithet, panarga, derives from the Greek, παναργος ("wholly white"). The male holotype for Periallactis panarga was collected at Crows Nest in Queensland.
