= Antipterna microphanes =

Scientific classification
- Kingdom: Animalia
- Phylum: Arthropoda
- Class: Insecta
- Order: Lepidoptera
- Family: Oecophoridae
- Genus: Antipterna
- Species: A. microphanes

Binomial name
- Antipterna microphanes (Lower, 1902)

Synonyms
- Ocystola microphanes Lower, 1902

Species of moth

Antipterna microphanes is a species of moth in the family Oecophoridae, first described by Oswald Bertram Lower in 1902 as Ocystola microphanes. The male holotype for Ocystola microphanes was collected at Stawell in Victoria.
