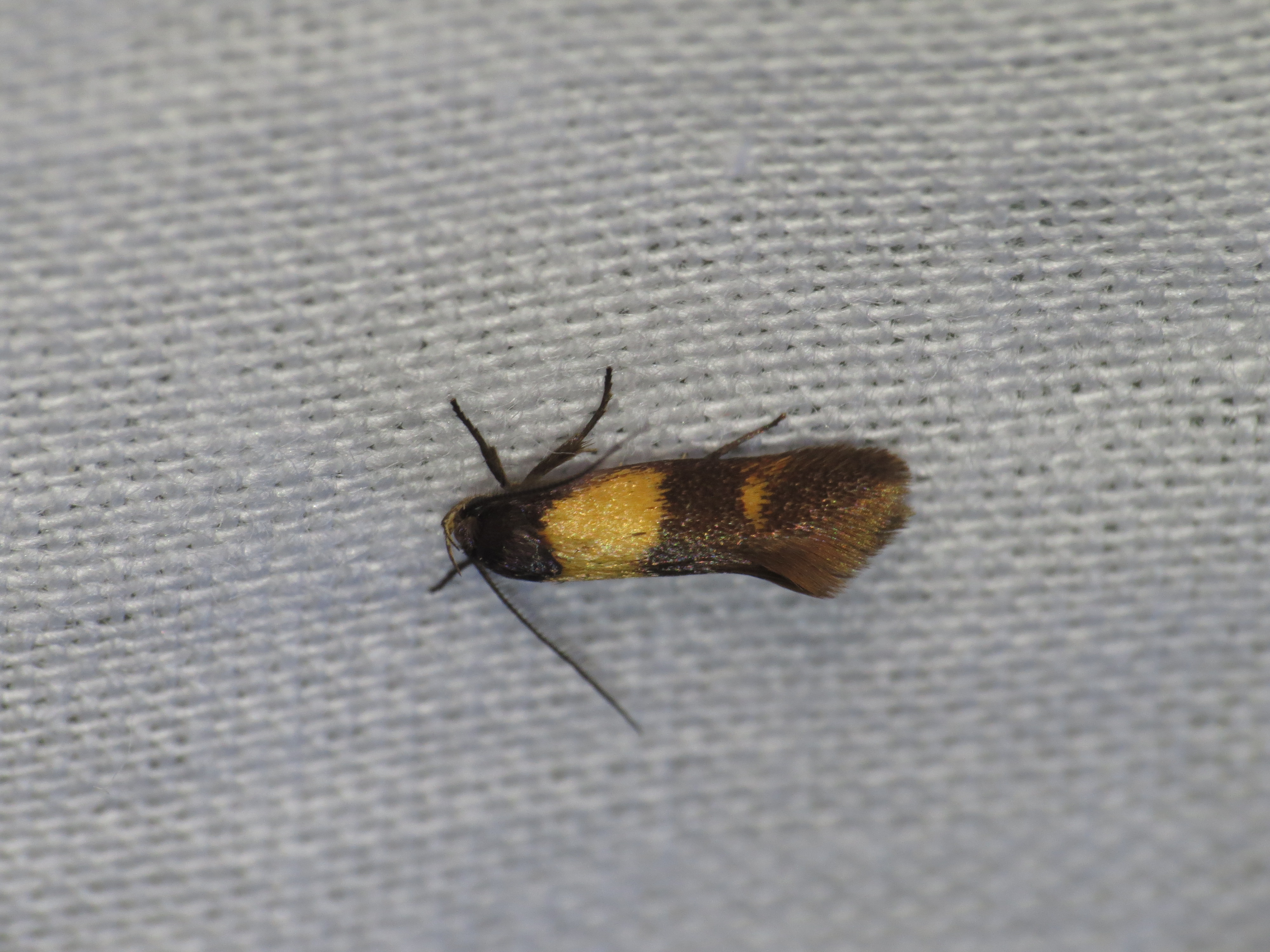

Scientific classification
- Domain: Eukaryota
- Kingdom: Animalia
- Phylum: Arthropoda
- Class: Insecta
- Order: Lepidoptera
- Family: Oecophoridae
- Genus: Antipterna
- Species: A. euanthes

Binomial name
- Antipterna euanthes (Meyrick, 1885)

Synonyms
- Ocystola euanthes Meyrick, 1885; Ocystola placoxantha Meyrick, 1885; Caesyra hemidesma Lower, 1897; Ocystola pachythrix Turner, 1917

= Antipterna euanthes =

Species of moth

Antipterna euanthes is a species of moth in the family Oecophoridae, first described by Edward Meyrick in 1885 as Ocystola euanthes, with the female lectotype being found in the Wirrabara Forest, South Australia. It appears to be a moth endemic to Australia and in addition to South Australia is also found in Victoria, New South Wales, and Queensland.

The larvae of this moth feed on leaves of eucalypts, and fold the leaf tips to make a shelter in which to develop.

== Meyrick's description ==
Female: 17 mm. Head yellow. Palpi dark fuscous, internally yellow-whitish, terminal joint nearly as long as second. Antennae, thorax, abdomen, and legs dark fuscous; posterior legs yellowish beneath. Forewings elongate, rather narrow, costa moderately arched, apex acute, hindmargin slightly sinuate, extremely oblique; yellow; markings dark fuscous, slightly purplish-tinged; a short streak from base of costa along inner margin to ¼; a moderately broad fascia from middle of costa to inner margin before anal angle, dilated beneath; an irregular fascia along hindmargin from apex to anal angle, touching central fascia: cilia dark fuscous. Hindwings ovate-lanceolate, acute, veins 3 and 4 from a point; dark fuscous; cilia dark fuscous.
Adelaide and Wirrabara Forest, South Australia; two specimens.
