= Antipterna assulosa =

Scientific classification
- Kingdom: Animalia
- Phylum: Arthropoda
- Class: Insecta
- Order: Lepidoptera
- Family: Oecophoridae
- Genus: Antipterna
- Species: A. assulosa

Binomial name
- Antipterna assulosa (Turner, 1940)

Synonyms
- Machaeretis assulosa Turner, 1940

Species of moth

Antipterna assulosa is a species of moth in the family Oecophoridae, first described by Alfred Jefferis Turner in 1940 as Machaeretis assulosa. The species epithet, assulosa, derives from the Latin adjective, assulosus ("like a splinter"). The holotype for Machaeretis assulosa was collected at Sandgate in Queensland.
