= Antipterna stichoptis =

Scientific classification
- Kingdom: Animalia
- Phylum: Arthropoda
- Class: Insecta
- Order: Lepidoptera
- Family: Oecophoridae
- Genus: Antipterna
- Species: A. stichoptis

Binomial name
- Antipterna stichoptis (Lower, 1915)

Synonyms
- Linosticha stichoptis Lower, 1915

Species of moth

Antipterna stichoptis is a species of moth in the family Oecophoridae, first described by Oswald Bertram Lower in 1915 as Linosticha stichoptis. The male holotype for Linosticha stichoptis was collected at Broken Hill in New South Wales, in a Casuarina tree.
