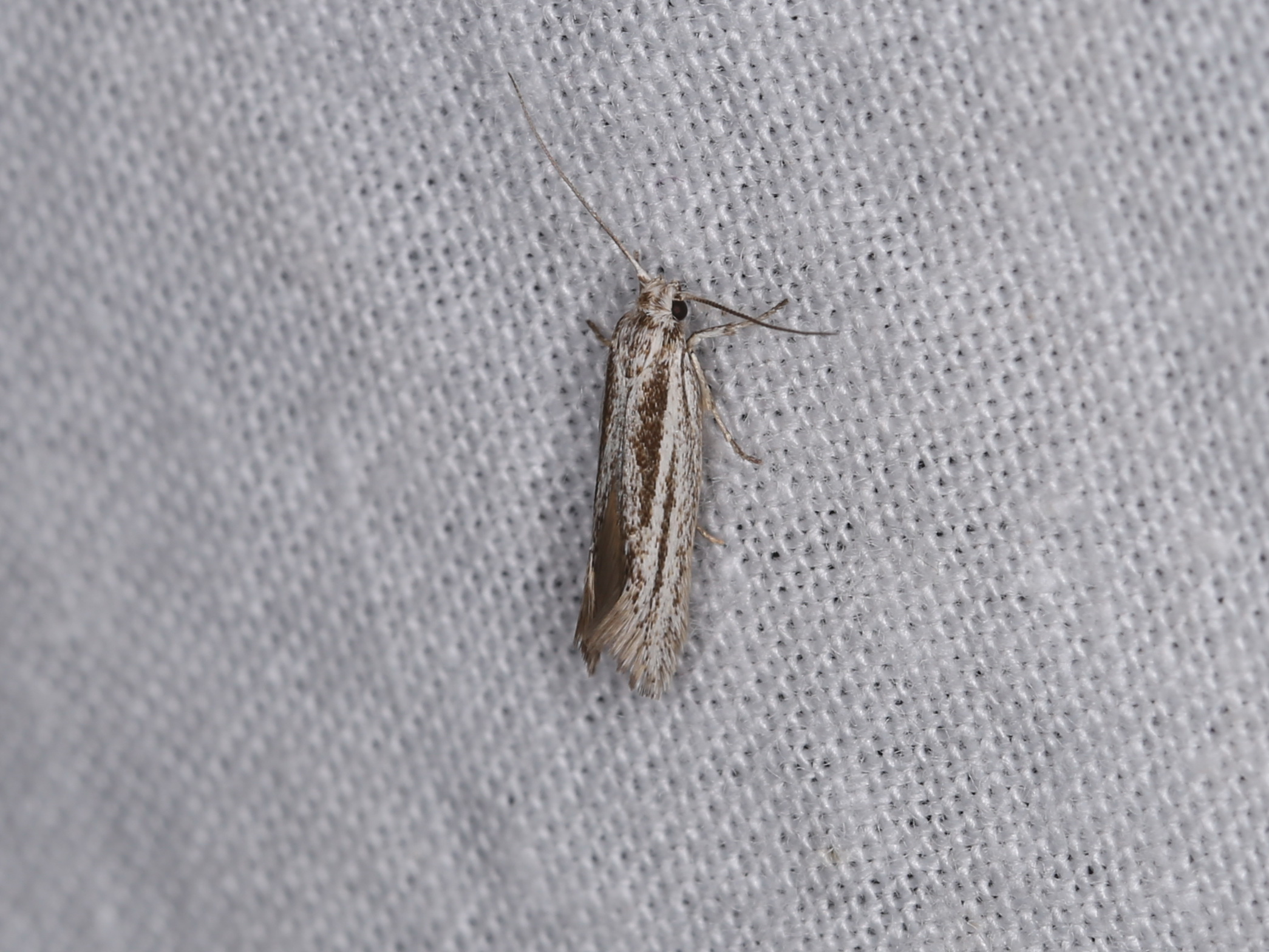

Scientific classification
- Kingdom: Animalia
- Phylum: Arthropoda
- Class: Insecta
- Order: Lepidoptera
- Family: Oecophoridae
- Genus: Antipterna
- Species: A. ptychomochla

Binomial name
- Antipterna ptychomochla Turner, 1940

= Antipterna ptychomochla =

Species of moths

Antipterna ptychomochla is a species of moth in the family Oecophoridae, first described by Alfred Jefferis Turner in 1940 as Antiterpna ptychomochla (sic). The species epithet derives from the Greek, πτυκομοχλοσ, meaning "with bar on fold".

== Distribution ==
It appears to be a moth endemic to Australia and found in South Australia and New South Wales, with occurrences near the confluence of the Murray and the Darling rivers. Turner described specimens from Merredin in Western Australia.
