= Antipterna glacialis =

Scientific classification
- Kingdom: Animalia
- Phylum: Arthropoda
- Class: Insecta
- Order: Lepidoptera
- Family: Oecophoridae
- Genus: Antipterna
- Species: A. glacialis

Binomial name
- Antipterna glacialis (Meyrick, 1885)

Synonyms
- Ocystola glacialis Meyrick, 1885

Species of moth

Antipterna glacialis is a species of moth in the family Oecophoridae, first described by Edward Meyrick in 1885 as Ocystola glacialis. The holotype was collected at Mount Lofty, South Australia.

== Meyrick's description ==
Male: 13 mm. Head and palpi white, terminal joint almost as long as second. Antennae, thorax, and abdomen whitish-grey; antennal ciliations 3. Legs dark grey, posterior pair whitish. Forewings elongate, narrow, costa moderately arched, apex acute, hind-margin faintly sinuate, extremely oblique shining white; a rather small subquadrate dark fuscous spot on inner margin beyond middle; a slender dark fuscous streak along hindmargin from apex to anal angle: cilia whitish, mixed with dark fuscous scales towards base. Hindwings broad-lanceolate, acute, veins 3 and 4 widely remote, parallel; light grey; cilia ochreous-whitish.
Mount Lofty, South Australia; one specimen received from Mr. E. Guest.
