= Antipterna acrobaphes =

Scientific classification
- Kingdom: Animalia
- Phylum: Arthropoda
- Class: Insecta
- Order: Lepidoptera
- Family: Oecophoridae
- Genus: Antipterna
- Species: A. acrobaphes

Binomial name
- Antipterna acrobaphes (Meyrick, 1885)

Synonyms
- Ocystola acrobaphes Meyrick, 1885

Species of moth

Antipterna acrobaphes is a species of moth in the family Oecophoridae, first described by Edward Meyrick in 1885 as Ocystola acrobaphes. The holotype was collected in Sydney, New South Wales, in January 1878.

== Meyrick's description ==
Male: 18 mm. Head light yellow-ochreous. Palpi ochreous-whitish, anterior edge dark grey, terminal joint 4/5 of second. Antennae grey, ciliations 3½. Thorax light yellow-ochreous, anterior margin strongly dark fuscous. Abdomen light greyish-ochieous. Legs dark grey, posterior pair whitish-ockreous. Fore-wings elongate, rather narrow, costa moderately arched, apex tolerably acute, hindmargin very obliquely rounded; pale ochreous-yellowish; extreme costal edge dark fuscous at base; a small roundish dark fuscous spot on anal angle; some dark fuscous scales at apex: cilia rather dark fuscous, towards middle of hind-margin mixed with pale ochreous-yellowish. Hindwings ovate-lanceolate, round-pointed, veins 3 and 4 from a point; grey; cilia grey.
Sydney, New South Wales; one specimen in January.
