= Antipterna hemimelas =

Scientific classification
- Kingdom: Animalia
- Phylum: Arthropoda
- Class: Insecta
- Order: Lepidoptera
- Family: Oecophoridae
- Genus: Antipterna
- Species: A. hemimelas

Binomial name
- Antipterna hemimelas (Turner, 1940)

Synonyms
- Ocystola hemimelas Turner, 1940

Species of moth

Antipterna hemimelas is a species of moth in the family Oecophoridae, first described by Alfred Jefferis Turner in 1940 as Ocystola hemimelas. The species epithet, hemimelas, derives from the Greek, έμιμελας ("half black"). The male holotype for Ocystola hemimelas was collected in Perth, Western Australia.
