= Antipterna monostropha =

Scientific classification
- Kingdom: Animalia
- Phylum: Arthropoda
- Class: Insecta
- Order: Lepidoptera
- Family: Oecophoridae
- Genus: Antipterna
- Species: A. monostropha

Binomial name
- Antipterna monostropha (Meyrick, 1885)

Synonyms
- Ocystola monostropha Meyrick, 1885

Species of moth

Antipterna monostropha is a species of moth in the family Oecophoridae, first described by Edward Meyrick in 1885 as Ocystola monostropha. The lectotype for Ocystola monostropha was collected at Blackheath, New South Wales.

Occurrence data from GBIF shows A. monostropha occurring in Western Australia, South Australia, New South Wales, and Queensland.

== Meyrick's description ==
Male & female: 16-20 mm. Head white, crown slightly greyish-tinged. Palpi white, anteriorly grey; terminal joint ⅔ of second. Antennae whitish, ciliations 5. Thorax light grey. Abdomen ochreous-whitish. Legs grey, posterior pair whitish. Forewings elongate, narrow, costa moderately arched, apex acute, hindmargin slightly sinuate, extremely oblique; shining white, very faintly ochreous-tinged; dorsal half suffused with light ochreous-grey from base to anal angle: cilia ochreous-white, beneath anal angle pale greyish-ochreous. Hindwings broad-lanceolate, ac\ite, veins 3 and 4 more or less remote or even parallel; grey; cilia very pale greyish-ochreous.
Sydney and Blackheath (3500 feet), New South Wales; rather common from September to November.
