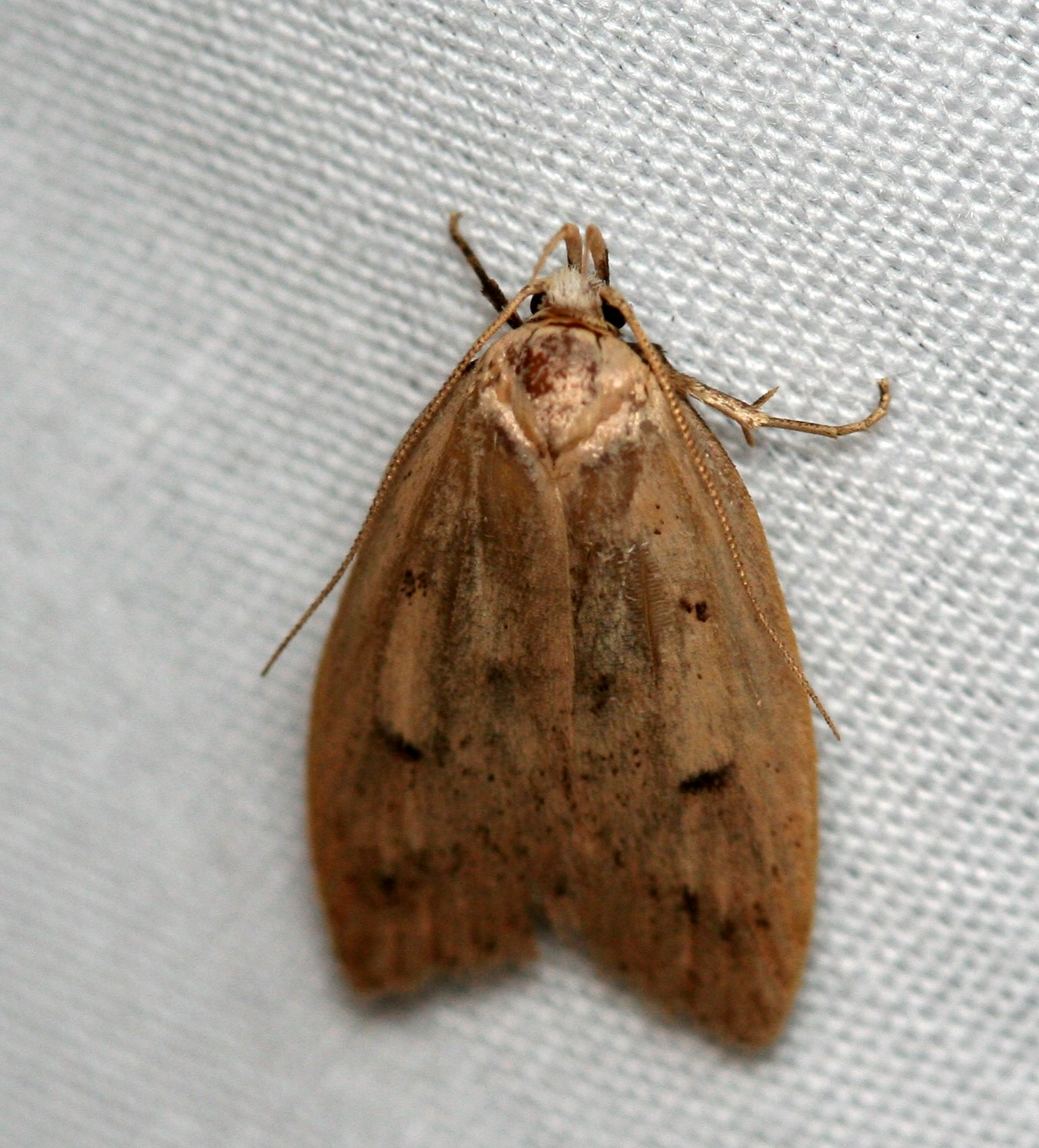
- Machimia_tentoriferella

Scientific classification
- Kingdom: Animalia
- Phylum: Arthropoda
- Clade: Pancrustacea
- Class: Insecta
- Order: Lepidoptera
- Family: Depressariidae
- Subfamily: Depressariinae
- Genus: Machimia; Clemens, 1860

= Machimia =

Genus of moths

Machimia is a genus of moths of the family Depressariidae described by James Brackenridge Clemens in 1860.

== Species ==
- Machimia aethostola Meyrick, 1931
- Machimia albula Turner, 1946
- Machimia anthracospora Meyrick, 1934
- Machimia caduca Walsingham, 1912
- Machimia chorrera Busck, 1914
- Machimia conspersa Turner, 1946
- Machimia cruda Meyrick, 1926
- Machimia cyphopleura Turner, 1946
- Machimia desertorum Berg, 1875
- Machimia diagrapha Meyrick, 1931
- Machimia dolopis Walsingham, 1912
- Machimia dystheata Turner, 1946
- Machimia eothina Meyrick, 1920
- Machimia guerneella de Joannis, 1914
- Machimia homopolia Turner, 1946
- Machimia ignicolor Busck, 1914
- Machimia illuminella Busck, 1914
- Machimia intaminata Meyrick, 1922
- Machimia metagypsa Turner, 1946
- Machimia miltosparsa Turner, 1914
- Machimia morata Meyrick, 1911
- Machimia neuroscia Meyrick, 1930
- Machimia notella Busck, 1914
- Machimia ochrophanes Turner, 1916
- Machimia oxybela Meyrick, 1931
- Machimia peperita Walsingham, 1912
- Machimia perianthes Meyrick, 1922
- Machimia pyrocalyx Meyrick, 1922
- Machimia pyrograpta Meyrick, 1932
- Machimia rhaphiducha Turner, 1946
- Machimia rogifera Meyrick, 1914
- Machimia sejunctella Walker, 1864
- Machimia serva Meyrick, 1920
- Machimia tentoriferella Clemens, 1860
- Machimia trigama Meyrick, 1928
- Machimia trunca Meyrick, 1930

== Former species ==
- Machimia absumptella Walker, 1864
- Machimia achroa Turner, 1896
- Machimia agglomerata Meyrick, 1920
- Machimia alma Meyrick, 1914
- Machimia amata Meyrick, 1914
- Machimia anaemica Turner, 1916
- Machimia analis Busck, 1914
- Machimia ancorata Walsingham, 1912
- Machimia atripunctatella Turner, 1896
- Machimia baliosticha Turner, 1946
- Machimia biseriata Meyrick, 1920
- Machimia brachytricha Turner, 1927
- Machimia brevicilia Turner, 1946
- Machimia caminodes Turner, 1916
- Machimia carella Walker, 1864
- Machimia carnea Zeller, 1855
- Machimia cholodella Meyrick, 1883
- Machimia coccinea Turner, 1917
- Machimia coccoscela Turner, 1946
- Machimia costimacula Meyrick, 1883
- Machimia crossota Walsingham, 1912
- Machimia crucifera Busck, 1914
- Machimia cryptorrhoda Turner, 1946
- Machimia cuphosema Turner, 1946
- Machimia cylicotypa Turner, 1946
- Machimia defessa Meyrick, 1920
- Machimia delosticta Turner, 1946
- Machimia ebenosticta Turner, 1946
- Machimia eoxantha Turner, 1896
- Machimia epicosma Turner, 1916
- Machimia erythema Walsingham, 1912
- Machimia eubrocha Turner, 1946
- Machimia fervida Zeller, 1855
- Machimia flava Zeller, 1839
- Machimia habroschema Turner, 1946
- Machimia haploceros Turner, 1946
- Machimia hebes Turner, 1946
- Machimia holochra Turner, 1946
- Machimia incensatella Walker, 1864
- Machimia interjecta Turner, 1946
- Machimia lera Turner, 1946
- Machimia leucerythra Meyrick, 1883
- Machimia limbata Meyrick, 1883
- Machimia loxomita Turner, 1946
- Machimia marcella Busck, 1914
- Machimia mesogaea Turner, 1916
- Machimia metaxantha Turner, 1946
- Machimia metriopis Meyrick, 1887
- Machimia micromita Turner, 1946
- Machimia microptera Turner, 1916
- Machimia miltosticha Turner, 1946
- Machimia mitescens Meyrick, 1914
- Machimia moderatella Walker, 1864
- Machimia mollis Turner, 1946
- Machimia myodes Meyrick, 1883
- Machimia neochlora Meyrick, 1883
- Machimia nephospila Turner, 1946
- Machimia notatana Walker, 1863
- Machimia notoporphyra Turner, 1946
- Machimia ochra Turner, 1946
- Machimia oncospila Turner, 1946
- Machimia pastea Turner, 1927
- Machimia phaenopis Turner, 1916
- Machimia picturata Turner, 1946
- Machimia platyporphyra Turner, 1946
- Machimia porphyraspis Turner, 1896
- Machimia praepedita Meyrick, 1920
- Machimia pseudota Lower, 1901
- Machimia pudica Zeller, 1855
- Machimia pyrrhopasta Turner, 1946
- Machimia pyrrhoxantha Meyrick, 1931
- Machimia repandula Zeller, 1855
- Machimia restricta Meyrick, 1920
- Machimia rhodopepla Lower, 1903
- Machimia rhoecozona Turner, 1946
- Machimia roseomarginella Busck, 1911
- Machimia rubella Turner, 1938
- Machimia rufa Meyrick, 1883
- Machimia rufescens Turner, 1946
- Machimia rufimaculella Turner, 1896
- Machimia sarcoxantha Lower, 1893
- Machimia sericata Meyrick, 1883
- Machimia similis Turner, 1946
- Machimia sobriella Walker, 1864
- Machimia stenomorpha Turner, 1946
- Machimia stenorrhoda Turner, 1946
- Machimia stygnodes Turner, 1946
- Machimia styphlodes Turner, 1946
- Machimia submissa Turner, 1946
- Machimia sulphurea Busck, 1914
- Machimia teratopa Meyrick, 1920
- Machimia umbratica Turner, 1946
- Machimia vestalis Zeller, 1873
- Machimia zatrephes Turner, 1916
- Machimia zelota Turner, 1916
