= G. carnea =

G. carnea may refer to:

- Garrha carnea, a concealer moth
- Geopyxis carnea, an apothecal fungus
- Gersemia carnea, a soft coral
- Glomera carnea, a flowering plant
- Glycera carnea, a blood worm
- Goodyera carnea, a white-flowered orchid
