= Machimia serva =

Scientific classification
- Kingdom: Animalia
- Phylum: Arthropoda
- Class: Insecta
- Order: Lepidoptera
- Family: Depressariidae
- Genus: Machimia
- Species: M. serva

Binomial name
- Machimia serva Meyrick, 1920

Species of moth

Machimia serva is a moth in the family Depressariidae. It was described by Edward Meyrick in 1920. It is found in Australia, where it has been recorded from Victoria.

The wingspan is about 26 mm. The forewings are pale greyish, irrorated (sprinkled) with fuscous. The stigmata is cloudy and dark grey, the plical spot rather beyond the first discal spot and there is an angulated subterminal series of faintly indicated darker dots. The hindwings are light grey.
