= Machimia trunca =

Scientific classification
- Kingdom: Animalia
- Phylum: Arthropoda
- Class: Insecta
- Order: Lepidoptera
- Family: Depressariidae
- Genus: Machimia
- Species: M. trunca

Binomial name
- Machimia trunca Meyrick, 1930

Species of moth

Machimia trunca is a moth in the family Depressariidae. It was described by Edward Meyrick in 1930. It is found in Pará, Brazil.
