= Prodelaca =

Scientific classification
- Kingdom: Animalia
- Phylum: Arthropoda
- Class: Insecta
- Order: Lepidoptera
- Family: Oecophoridae
- Subfamily: Oecophorinae
- Genus: Prodelaca; Common, 1994

Species
- See text.

Genus of moths

Prodelaca is a genus of moths of the family Oecophoridae.

== Species ==
- Prodelaca achalinella (Meyrick, 1883)
- Prodelaca biseriata (Meyrick, 1920)
- Prodelaca eocrossa (Meyrick, 1888)
- Prodelaca leptochroma (Turner, 1937)
- Prodelaca limata (Meyrick, 1914)
- Prodelaca micropasta (Turner, 1944)
- Prodelaca myodes (Meyrick, 1883)
- Prodelaca puellaris (Meyrick, 1883)
