= Machimia pyrograpta =

Scientific classification
- Kingdom: Animalia
- Phylum: Arthropoda
- Class: Insecta
- Order: Lepidoptera
- Family: Depressariidae
- Genus: Machimia
- Species: M. pyrograpta

Binomial name
- Machimia pyrograpta Meyrick, 1932

Species of moth

Machimia pyrograpta is a moth in the family Depressariidae. It was described by Edward Meyrick in 1932. It is found in Bolivia.
