= Machimia sejunctella =

Scientific classification
- Kingdom: Animalia
- Phylum: Arthropoda
- Class: Insecta
- Order: Lepidoptera
- Family: Depressariidae
- Genus: Machimia
- Species: M. sejunctella

Binomial name
- Machimia sejunctella (Walker, 1864)

Synonyms
- Gelechia sejunctella Walker, 1864

Species of moth

Machimia sejunctella is a moth in the family Depressariidae. It was described by Francis Walker in 1864. It is found in Brazil.

Adults are fawn coloured, the forewings with a broad darker fawn-coloured band and an elongated submarginal spot of the same colour. The hindwings are blackish.
