= Machimia eothina =

Scientific classification
- Kingdom: Animalia
- Phylum: Arthropoda
- Class: Insecta
- Order: Lepidoptera
- Family: Depressariidae
- Genus: Machimia
- Species: M. eothina

Binomial name
- Machimia eothina Meyrick, 1920

Species of moth

Machimia eothina is a moth in the family Depressariidae. It was described by Edward Meyrick in 1920. It is found in French Guiana.

The wingspan is about 17 mm. The forewings are whitish with scattered dark grey scales. The costa is narrowly suffused with pale rosy and the stigmata is cloudy and dark grey. There is a curved subterminal series of cloudy dark grey dots from beneath the costa at three-fourths to before the tornus. The terminal edge is rosy tinged. The hindwings are ochreous whitish.
