= Sclerocris =

Scientific classification
- Kingdom: Animalia
- Phylum: Arthropoda
- Class: Insecta
- Order: Lepidoptera
- Family: Oecophoridae
- Subfamily: Oecophorinae
- Genus: Sclerocris; Common, 1997

Species
- See text.

Genus of moths

Sclerocris is a genus of moths of the family Oecophoridae.

== Species ==
- Sclerocris acropenthes (Turner, 1938)
- Sclerocris albipalpis (Turner, 1939)
- Sclerocris amoebaea (Meyrick, 1889)
- Sclerocris amphisema (Lower, 1907)
- Sclerocris chalcoxantha (Meyrick, 1889)
- Sclerocris chiastis (Meyrick, 1889)
- Sclerocris comoxantha (Meyrick, 1889)
- Sclerocris cremnodes (Meyrick, 1883)
- Sclerocris crocinastis (Meyrick, 1889)
- Sclerocris cyclodesma (Turner, 1938)
- Sclerocris echidnias (Meyrick, 1889)
- Sclerocris goniosticha (Turner, 1939)
- Sclerocris gymnastica (Meyrick, 1920)
- Sclerocris menodes (Meyrick, 1888)
- Sclerocris nephelopa (Meyrick, 1883)
- Sclerocris nomistis (Meyrick, 1889)
- Sclerocris ochrosarca (Turner, 1938)
- Sclerocris pithanodes (Meyrick, 1920)
- Sclerocris styphlodes (Turner, 1946)
- Sclerocris tetragona (Meyrick, 1889)
- Sclerocris tetrasticha (Turner, 1944)
- Sclerocris thetica (Turner, 1916)
- Sclerocris thiodes (Turner, 1917)
