= Enoplidia =

Scientific classification
- Kingdom: Animalia
- Phylum: Arthropoda
- Class: Insecta
- Order: Lepidoptera
- Family: Oecophoridae
- Subfamily: Oecophorinae
- Genus: Enoplidia; Common, 1994

Species
- See text.

Moth genus of family Oecophoridae

Enoplidia is a genus of moths of the family Oecophoridae.

== Species ==
- Enoplidia simplex (Turner, 1896)
- Enoplidia stenomorpha (Turner, 1946)
