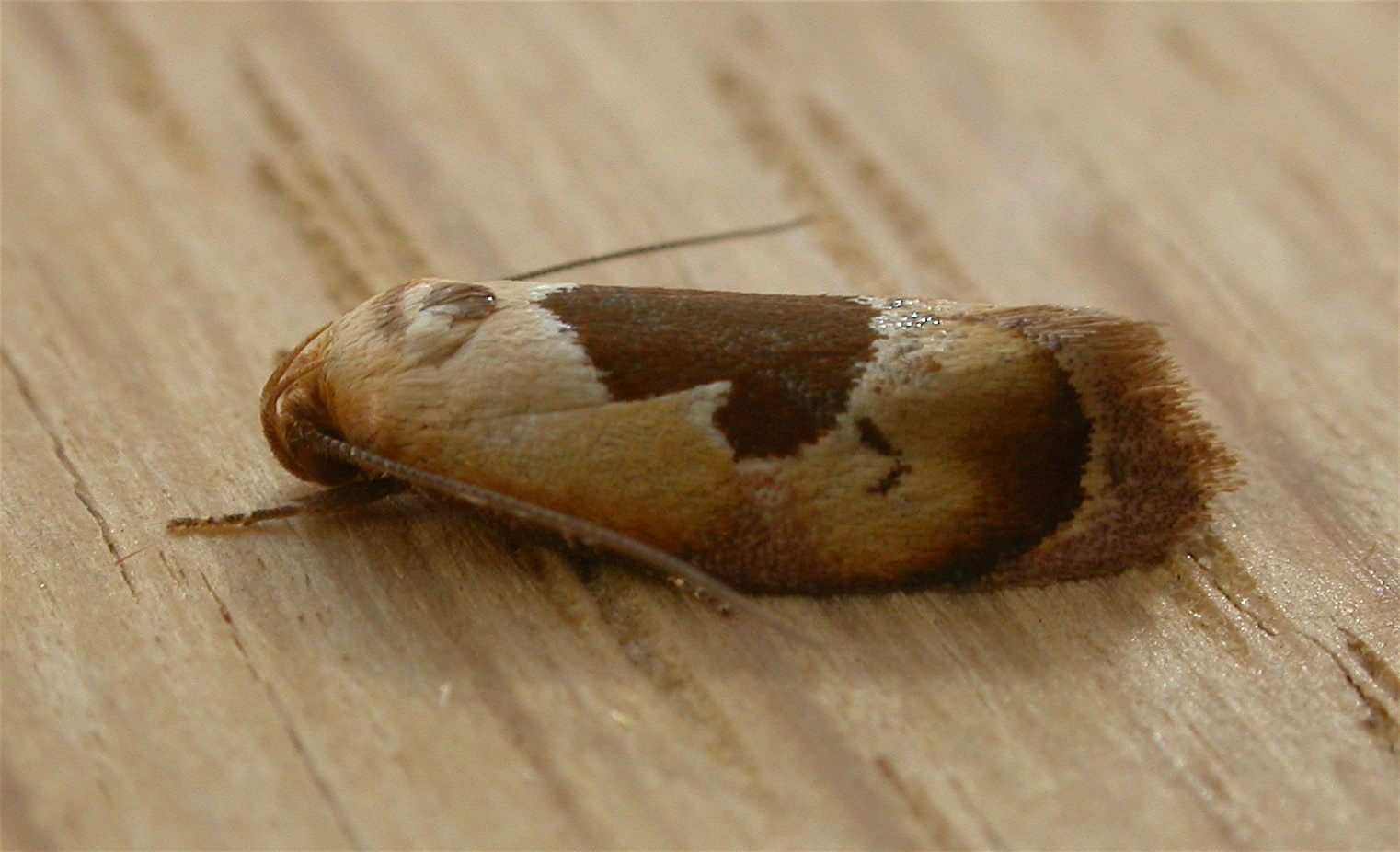

Scientific classification
- Kingdom: Animalia
- Phylum: Arthropoda
- Class: Insecta
- Order: Lepidoptera
- Family: Oecophoridae
- Genus: Hoplomorpha
- Species: H. camelaea

Binomial name
- Hoplomorpha camelaea (Meyrick, 1888)

Synonyms
- Eulechria camelaea Meyrick, 1888

= Hoplomorpha camelaea =

Species of moth

Hoplomorpha camelaea is a moth in the family Oecophoridae first described by Edward Meyrick in 1888. It is found in Australia, where it has been recorded from Victoria, Queensland, New South Wales and the Australian Capital Territory.

The wingspan is about 17 mm. The forewings are whitish ochreous with a large dark reddish-fuscous white-margined blotch extending on the inner margin from one-fourth to four-fifths, gradually narrowing upwards, reaching more than halfway across the wing, the upperside rounded but deeply triangularly indented before the middle. There is a cloudy greyish-pink band from the middle of the costa to the apex of this blotch, posteriorly margined by a brown line suffused with ferruginous and a curved transverse linear dark fuscous mark in the disc, its lower extremity touching the upper posterior angle of the blotch. There is a dark brown streak, suffused beneath with ferruginous, along the costa from the base, interrupted by a median band, beyond it leaving the costa and continued in a strong outward curve to the anal angle, broader and more suffused anteriorly in the disc, attenuated and nearly obsolete on the anal angle. The curve is posteriorly well defined and margined by a whitish-ochreous line except towards the costa. Beyond this line, the apical area is wholly greyish pink. The hindwings are whitish ochreous, the apical half dark grey, continued as a suffused streak along the hindmargin to the anal angle.
