= Parocystola =

Scientific classification
- Kingdom: Animalia
- Phylum: Arthropoda
- Clade: Pancrustacea
- Class: Insecta
- Order: Lepidoptera
- Family: Oecophoridae
- Subfamily: Oecophorinae
- Genus: Parocystola; Turner, 1896

Species
- See text.

Genus of moths

Parocystola is a genus of moths of the family Oecophoridae.

== Species ==
Species in this genus include:

- Parocystola eubrocha (Turner, 1946)
- Parocystola holodryas (Lower, 1899)
- Parocystola leucospora Turner, 1896
- Parocystola solae (Walsingham, 1911)
