= Machimia diagrapha =

Scientific classification
- Kingdom: Animalia
- Phylum: Arthropoda
- Class: Insecta
- Order: Lepidoptera
- Family: Depressariidae
- Genus: Machimia
- Species: M. diagrapha

Binomial name
- Machimia diagrapha Meyrick, 1931

Species of moth

Machimia diagrapha is a moth in the family Depressariidae. It was described by Edward Meyrick in 1931. It is found in Paraguay.
