= Stereoloba =

Scientific classification
- Kingdom: Animalia
- Phylum: Arthropoda
- Class: Insecta
- Order: Lepidoptera
- Family: Oecophoridae
- Subfamily: Oecophorinae
- Genus: Stereoloba; Common, 1994

Species
- See text.

Genus of moths

Stereoloba is a genus of moths of the family Oecophoridae.

== Species ==
- Stereoloba diphracta (Lower, 1920)
- Stereoloba melanoplecta (Turner, 1917)
- Stereoloba promiscua (Meyrick, 1922)
