= Garrha acosmeta =

Scientific classification
- Kingdom: Animalia
- Phylum: Arthropoda
- Clade: Pancrustacea
- Class: Insecta
- Order: Lepidoptera
- Family: Oecophoridae
- Genus: Garrha
- Species: G. acosmeta

Binomial name
- Garrha acosmeta (Turner, 1896)

Synonyms
- Heliocausta acosmeta Turner, 1896

Species of moth

Garrha acosmeta is a moth in the family Oecophoridae. It was described by Alfred Jefferis Turner in 1896. It is found in Australia, where it has been recorded from Queensland.

The wingspan is about 23 mm. The forewings are ochreous, inclining to pinkish. The costal edge is uniformly coloured with the disc and the markings are pale fuscous and very obscure. There is a fine dentate line curving outwards from the costa beyond the middle, and becoming parallel to the hindmargin at six-fifths. There are also traces of a median and inner line and there is a series of faint dots on the hindmargin. The hindwings are whitish, the hindmargin and apex ochreous tinged.
