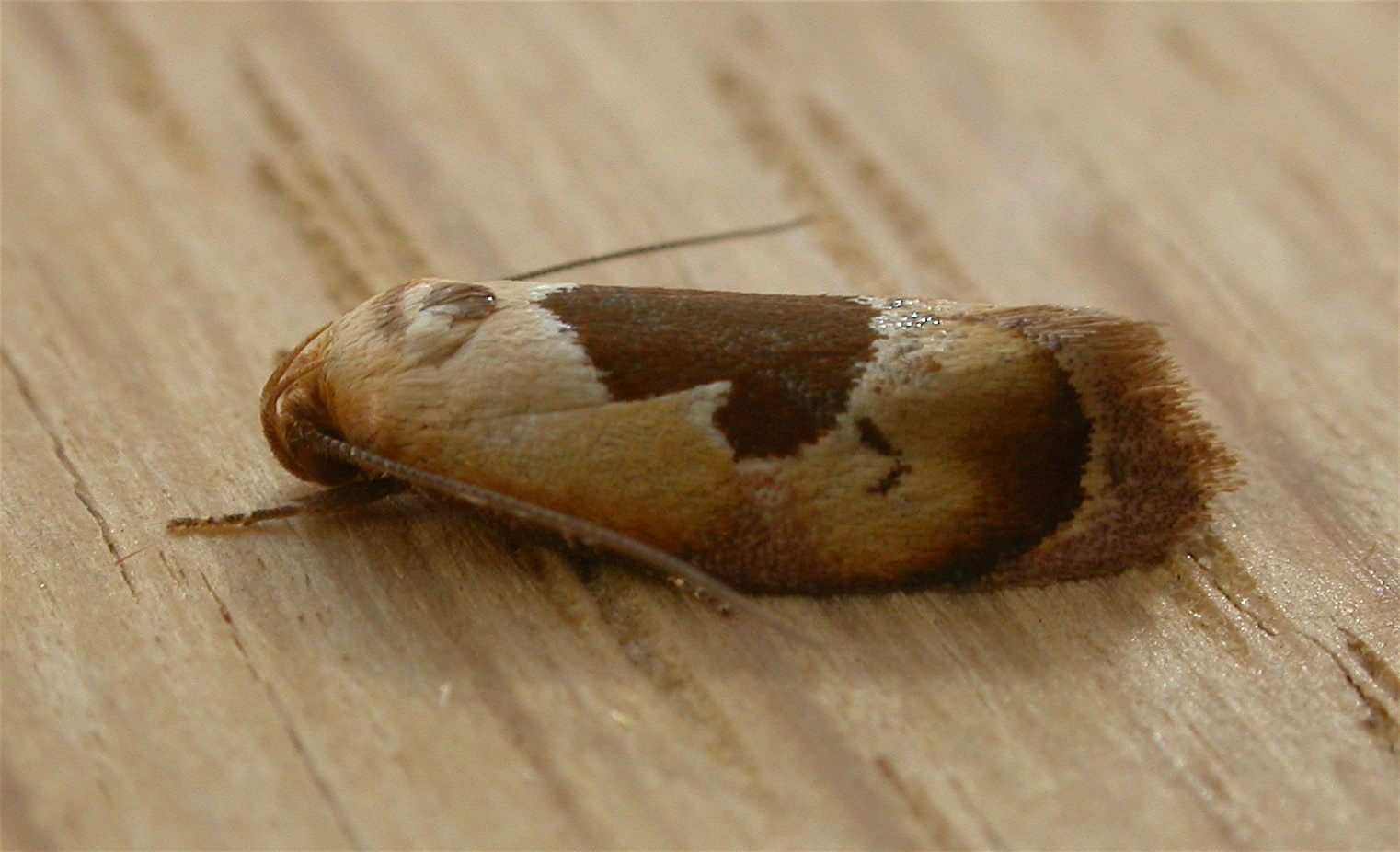
- Hoplomorpha camelaea

Scientific classification
- Kingdom: Animalia
- Phylum: Arthropoda
- Class: Insecta
- Order: Lepidoptera
- Family: Oecophoridae
- Subfamily: Oecophorinae
- Genus: Hoplomorpha; Turner, 1916

Species
- See text.

= Hoplomorpha =

Genus of moths

Hoplomorpha is a genus of moths of the family Oecophoridae.

== Species ==
- Hoplomorpha abalienella (Walker, 1864)
- Hoplomorpha camelaea (Meyrick, 1888)
- Hoplomorpha caminodes Turner, 1916
- Hoplomorpha epicosma Turner, 1916
- Hoplomorpha notatana (Walker, 1863)
- Hoplomorpha teratopa (Meyrick, 1920)
