= Machimia guerneella =

Scientific classification
- Domain: Eukaryota
- Kingdom: Animalia
- Phylum: Arthropoda
- Class: Insecta
- Order: Lepidoptera
- Family: Depressariidae
- Genus: Machimia
- Species: M. guerneella

Binomial name
- Machimia guerneella de Joannis, 1914

Species of moth

Machimia guerneella is a moth in the family of Depressariidae. This specific type of moth is found in Japan.

The wingspan is about 17 mm, the forewings are grey with black dots, and the hindwings are pale grey.
