= Machimia illuminella =

Scientific classification
- Kingdom: Animalia
- Phylum: Arthropoda
- Clade: Pancrustacea
- Class: Insecta
- Order: Lepidoptera
- Family: Depressariidae
- Genus: Machimia
- Species: M. illuminella

Binomial name
- Machimia illuminella (Busck, 1914)

Synonyms
- Cryptolechia illuminella Busck, 1914

Species of moth

Machimia illuminella is a moth in the family Depressariidae. It was described by August Busck in 1914. It is found in Panama and Costa Rica.

The wingspan is about 17 mm. The forewings are golden brown with a brick-red costal edge with a black extreme edge. There are three indistinct darker brown transverse lines. The terminal edge is broadly dark brown. The hindwings are bright red.
