= Stictochila =

Scientific classification
- Kingdom: Animalia
- Phylum: Arthropoda
- Class: Insecta
- Order: Lepidoptera
- Family: Oecophoridae
- Subfamily: Oecophorinae
- Genus: Stictochila; Common, 1994

Species
- See text.

Genus of moths

Stictochila is a genus of moths of the family Oecophoridae.

== Species ==
- Stictochila delosticta (Turner, 1946)
- Stictochila metata (Meyrick, 1914)
- Stictochila myriospila (Lower, 1903)
- Stictochila sarcoptera (Lower, 1897)
