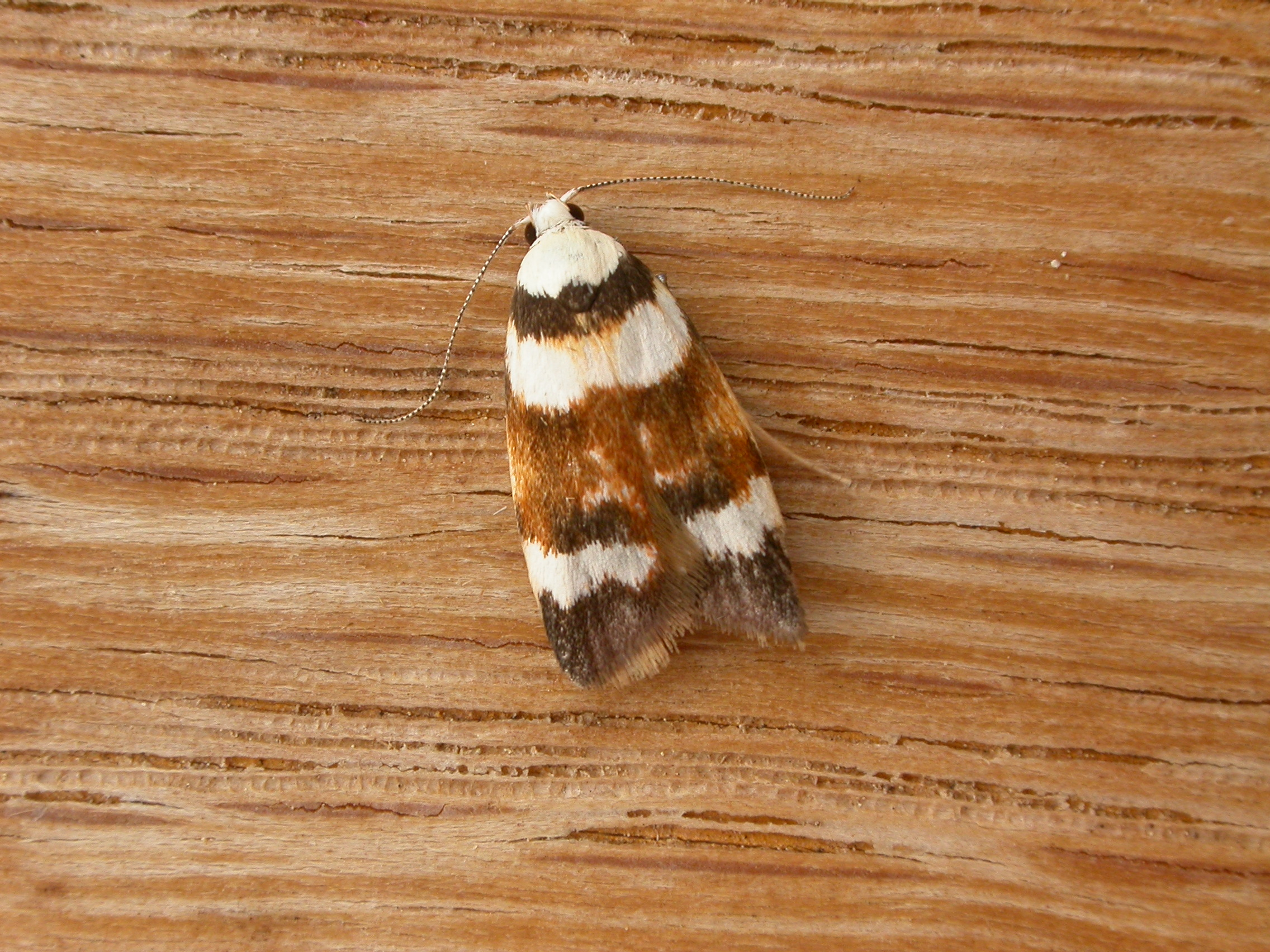

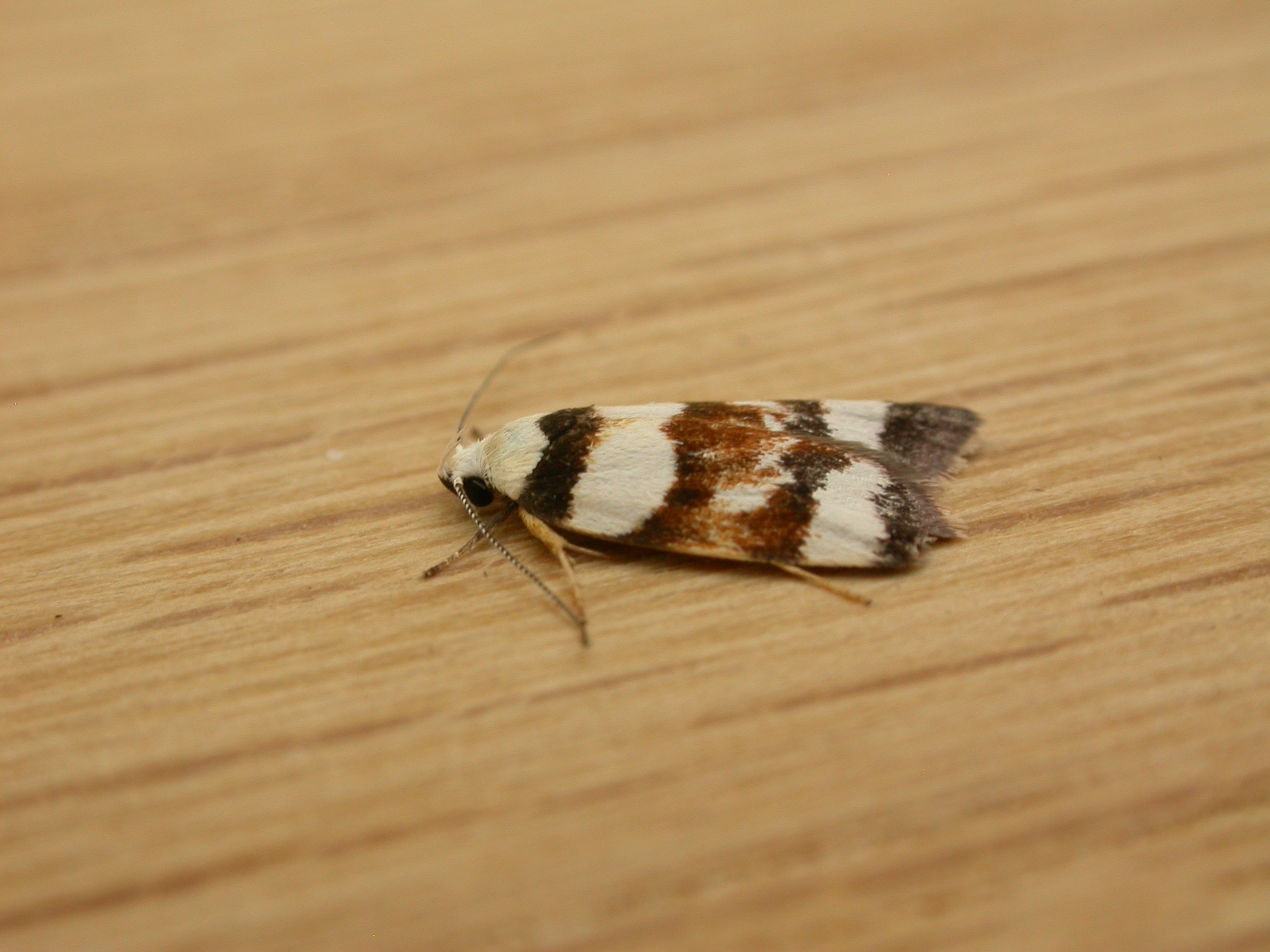

Scientific classification
- Kingdom: Animalia
- Phylum: Arthropoda
- Class: Insecta
- Order: Lepidoptera
- Family: Oecophoridae
- Genus: Catacometes
- Species: C. phanozona

Binomial name
- Catacometes phanozona (Turner, 1896)

Synonyms
- Heliocausta phanozona Turner, 1896

= Catacometes phanozona =

Species of moth

Catacometes phanozona is a moth of the family Oecophoridae. It is known in Australia from the Australian Capital Territory, New South Wales, Queensland and Victoria.
