= Machimia notella =

Scientific classification
- Domain: Eukaryota
- Kingdom: Animalia
- Phylum: Arthropoda
- Class: Insecta
- Order: Lepidoptera
- Family: Depressariidae
- Genus: Machimia
- Species: M. notella

Binomial name
- Machimia notella (Busck, 1914)

Synonyms
- Cryptolechia notella Busck, 1914

Species of moth

Machimia notella is a moth in the family Depressariidae. It was described by August Busck in 1914. It is found in Panama.

The wingspan is 14–16 mm. The forewings are reddish ochreous, with the extreme of the costa black. There is a small black dot at the base of the wing and a large round black spot on the middle of the cell, as well as an ill-defined spot obliquely above this on the costal edge just before the middle. There is also an indistinct curved series of black dots parallel with the apical and terminal edges at the apical fifth, as well as a small black dot on the fold. The hindwings are reddish ochreous with a strong sheen.
