= Machimia chorrera =

Scientific classification
- Domain: Eukaryota
- Kingdom: Animalia
- Phylum: Arthropoda
- Class: Insecta
- Order: Lepidoptera
- Family: Depressariidae
- Genus: Machimia
- Species: M. chorrera

Binomial name
- Machimia chorrera (Busck, 1914)

Synonyms
- Cryptolechia chorrera Busck, 1914

Species of moth

Machimia chorrera is a moth in the family Depressariidae. It was described by August Busck in 1914. It is found in Panama.

The wingspan is 19–20 mm. The forewings are light violaceous brown, the basal fourth of the costa edge black. There is a small black dot on the middle of the cell and another at the end of the cell, as well as a similar spot on the middle of the fold. There is a faint series of black spots at the apical fifth, parallel with the apical and terminal edges, which are narrowly rose coloured. The hindwings are dull fuscous.
