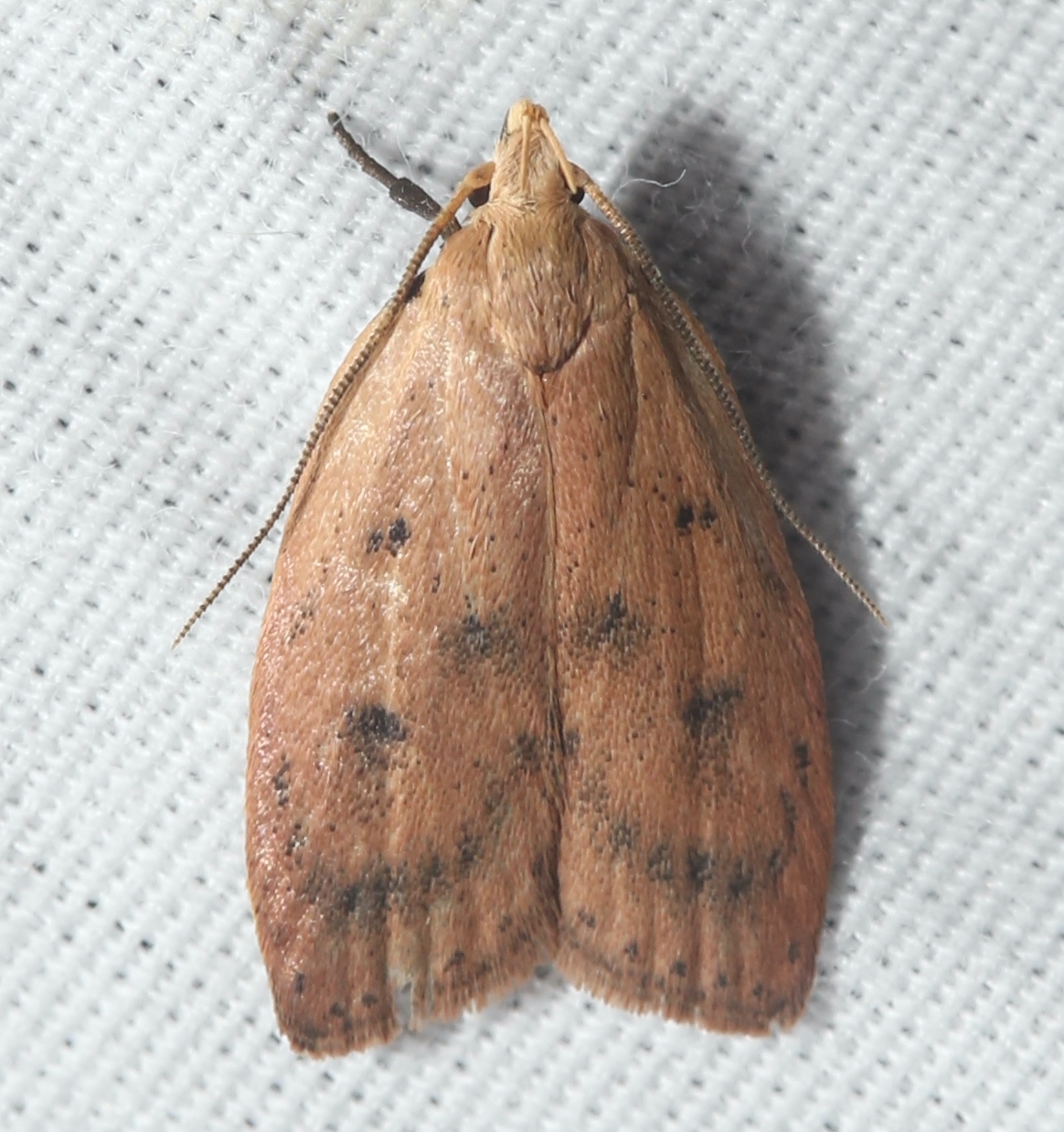

Scientific classification
- Kingdom: Animalia
- Phylum: Arthropoda
- Class: Insecta
- Order: Lepidoptera
- Family: Depressariidae
- Genus: Machimia
- Species: M. tentoriferella

Binomial name
- Machimia tentoriferella Clemens, 1860

Synonyms
- Depressaria confertella Walker, 1864; Depressaria fernaldella Chambers, 1878

= Machimia tentoriferella =

Species of moth

The gold-striped leaftier moth (Machimia tentoriferella) is a moth of the family Depressariidae. It is found in North America from Nova Scotia to North Carolina and Tennessee, west to Mississippi and Iowa, north to Ontario.

The binomial name tentoriferella refers to Latin tentorium (meaning "a tent"), this probably is a reference to the rolled or tied leaf enclosure made by the larva.

The wingspan is 20–26 mm. Adults fly from September to October depending on the location.

The larvae feed on Fraxinus americana and Fraxinus nigra. Other recorded food plants include birch, elm, maple, oak, basswood, butternut, cherry, beech, hickory, balsam poplar, chestnut, hazel, apple, lilac and dogwood.
