= Heliocausta =

Scientific classification
- Kingdom: Animalia
- Phylum: Arthropoda
- Class: Insecta
- Order: Lepidoptera
- Family: Oecophoridae
- Subfamily: Oecophorinae
- Genus: Heliocausta; Meyrick, 1883

Genus of moths

Heliocausta is a genus of moths of the family Oecophoridae.

== Species ==
- Heliocausta floridula Meyrick, 1913
- Heliocausta oecophorella (Walker, 1864)
- Heliocausta pelosticta Meyrick, 1883
- Heliocausta sarcodes Turner, 1917
- Heliocausta semiruptella (Walker, 1864)
- Heliocausta triphaenatella (Walker, 1864)
- Heliocausta unguentaria Meyrick, 1921
