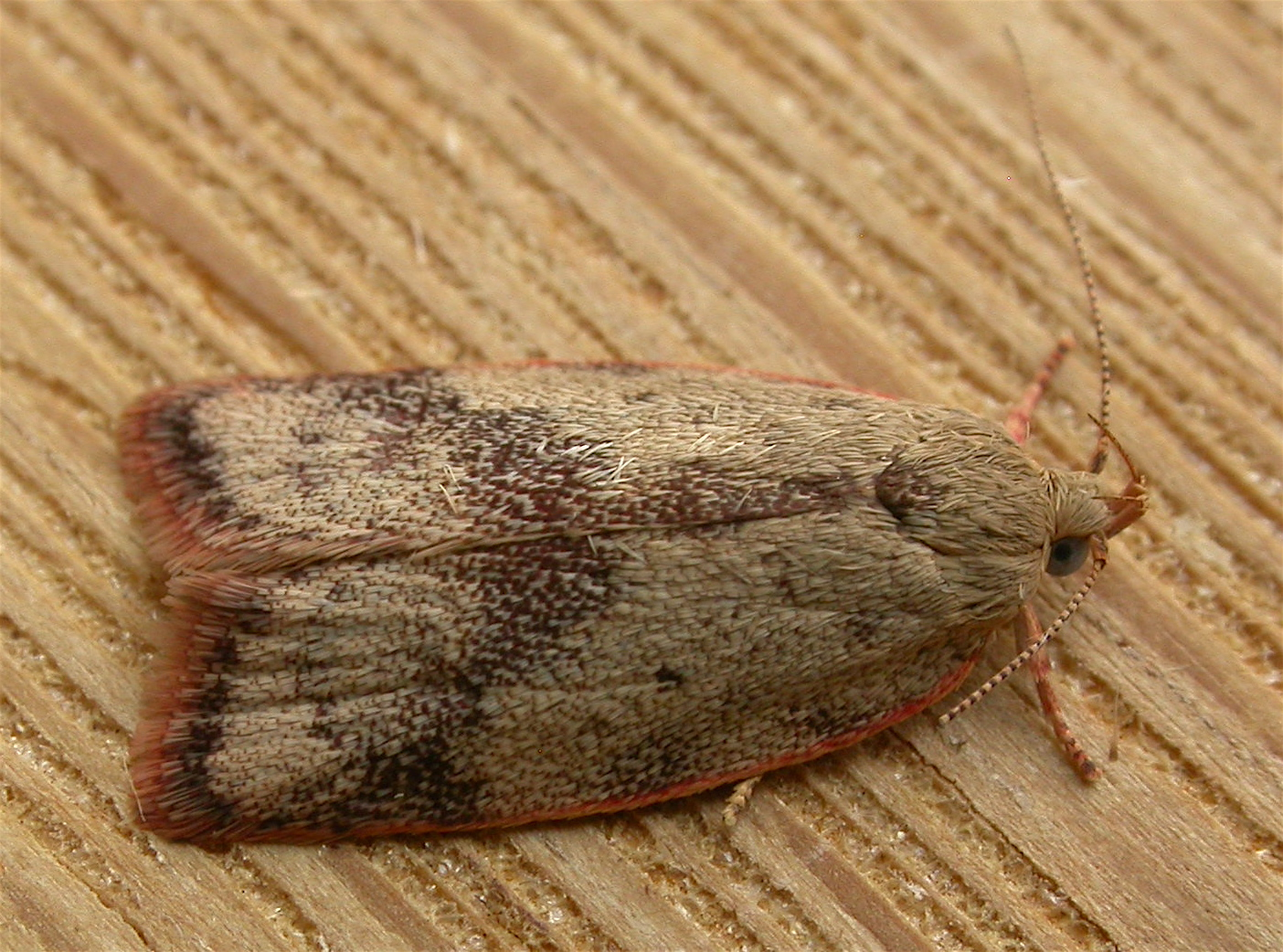
- Garrha limbata

Scientific classification
- Kingdom: Animalia
- Phylum: Arthropoda
- Class: Insecta
- Order: Lepidoptera
- Family: Oecophoridae
- Subfamily: Oecophorinae
- Genus: Garrha; Walker, 1866

Species
- See text.

Synonyms
- Euryplaca Meyrick, 1883; Hoplitica Meyrick, 1883

= Garrha =

Genus of moths

Garrha is a genus of moths of the family Oecophoridae.

== Species ==
- Garrha absumptella (Walker, 1864)
- Garrha achroa (Turner, 1896)
- Garrha acosmeta (Turner, 1896)
- Garrha agglomerata (Meyrick, 1920)
- Garrha alma (Meyrick, 1914)
- Garrha amata (Meyrick, 1914)
- Garrha arrhodea (Turner, 1917)
- Garrha atoecha (Meyrick, 1886)
- Garrha atripunctatella (Turner, 1896)
- Garrha brachytricha (Turner, 1927)
- Garrha carnea (Zeller, 1855)
- Garrha cholodella (Meyrick, 1883)
- Garrha coccinea (Turner, 1917)
- Garrha costimacula (Meyrick, 1883)
- Garrha cylicotypa (Turner, 1946)
- Garrha defessa (Meyrick, 1920)
- Garrha demotica (Meyrick, 1883)
- Garrha eugramma (Lower, 1894)
- Garrha gypsopyga (Meyrick, 1914)
- Garrha icasta (Turner, 1941)
- Garrha idiosema (Turner, 1917)
- Garrha interjecta (Turner, 1946)
- Garrha leucerythra (Meyrick, 1883)
- Garrha limbata (Meyrick, 1883)
- Garrha mellichroa (Lower, 1897)
- Garrha mesodesma (Meyrick, 1889)
- Garrha mesogaea (Turner, 1916)
- Garrha metriopis (Meyrick, 1888)
- Garrha micromita (Turner, 1946)
- Garrha miltopsara (Turner, 1914)
- Garrha mitescens (Meyrick, 1914)
- Garrha moderatella (Walker, 1864)
- Garrha ocellifera (Meyrick, 1883)
- Garrha ochra (Turner, 1946)
- Garrha oncospila (Turner, 1946)
- Garrha paraderces (Meyrick, 1889)
- Garrha phaeoporphyra (Turner, 1939)
- Garrha phoenopis (Turner, 1916)
- Garrha platyporphyra (Turner, 1946)
- Garrha pseudota (Lower, 1901)
- Garrha pudica (Zeller, 1855)
- Garrha pyrrhopasta (Turner, 1946)
- Garrha repandula (Zeller, 1855)
- Garrha rubella (Turner, 1939)
- Garrha rufa (Meyrick, 1883)
- Garrha rufescens (Turner, 1946)
- Garrha rufimaculella (Turner, 1896)
- Garrha sericata (Meyrick, 1883)
- Garrha sincerella Walker, 1866
- Garrha spatiosa (Meyrick, 1921)
- Garrha submissa (Turner, 1946)
- Garrha umbratica (Turner, 1946)
- Garrha zonostola (Meyrick, 1884)
