= Prionocris =

Scientific classification
- Kingdom: Animalia
- Phylum: Arthropoda
- Class: Insecta
- Order: Lepidoptera
- Family: Oecophoridae
- Subfamily: Oecophorinae
- Genus: Prionocris; Common, 1994

Species
- See text.

Genus of moths

Prionocris is a genus of moths of the family Oecophoridae.

== Species ==
- Prionocris acmaea (Meyrick, 1888)
- Prionocris charodes (Lower, 1920)
- Prionocris complanula (Turner, 1896)
- Prionocris mollis (Turner, 1946)
- Prionocris phylacopis (Meyrick, 1888)
- Prionocris protoxantha (Meyrick, 1883)
- Prionocris rhodopepla (Lower, 1903)
