= Brachynemata =

Scientific classification
- Kingdom: Animalia
- Phylum: Arthropoda
- Class: Insecta
- Order: Lepidoptera
- Family: Oecophoridae
- Subfamily: Oecophorinae
- Genus: Brachynemata; Meyrick, 1883

Species
- See text.

Synonyms
- Brachynemata Meyrick, 1885

Genus of moths

Brachynemata is a genus of moths of the family Oecophoridae.

== Species ==
- Brachynemata aphanes (Meyrick, 1884)
- Brachynemata cingulata Meyrick, 1885
- Brachynemata diantha (Meyrick, 1913)
- Brachynemata epiphragma (Meyrick, 1888)
- Brachynemata ichneuta (Meyrick, 1888)
- Brachynemata leucanepsia (Turner, 1940)
- Brachynemata mimopa (Meyrick, 1902)
- Brachynemata ochrolitha (Lower, 1903)
- Brachynemata ombrodes (Lower, 1897)
- Brachynemata restricta (Meyrick, 1920)
