= Machimia cruda =

Scientific classification
- Kingdom: Animalia
- Phylum: Arthropoda
- Class: Insecta
- Order: Lepidoptera
- Family: Depressariidae
- Genus: Machimia
- Species: M. cruda

Binomial name
- Machimia cruda Meyrick, 1926

Species of moth

Machimia cruda is a moth in the family Depressariidae. It was described by Edward Meyrick in 1926. It is found in Colombia.

The wingspan is about 25 mm. The forewings are pinkish ochreous tinged with grey. The discal stigmata is dark fuscous and there are two posterior curved transverse series of small undefined groups of dark fuscous scales. The hindwings are pale greyish, faintly tinged with pinkish.
