= Catacometes =

Scientific classification
- Kingdom: Animalia
- Phylum: Arthropoda
- Class: Insecta
- Order: Lepidoptera
- Family: Oecophoridae
- Subfamily: Oecophorinae
- Genus: Catacometes; Common, 1994

Species
- See text

Genus of moths

Catacometes is a genus of moths of the family Oecophoridae.

== Species ==
- Catacometes hemiscia (Meyrick, 1883)
- Catacometes phanozona (Turner, 1896)
