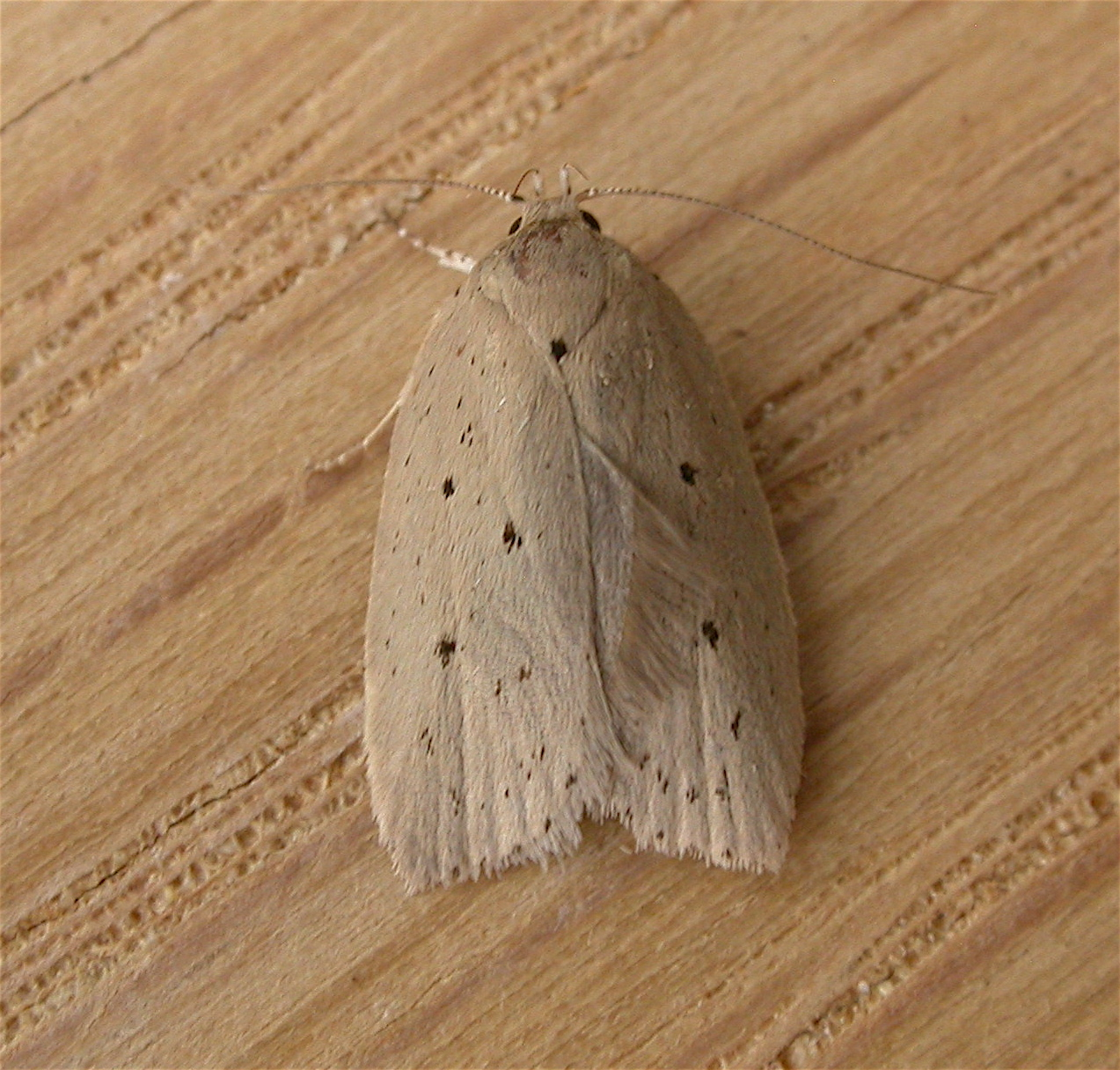
- Ironopolia

Scientific classification
- Kingdom: Animalia
- Phylum: Arthropoda
- Class: Insecta
- Order: Lepidoptera
- Family: Oecophoridae
- Subfamily: Oecophorinae
- Genus: Ironopolia; Common, 1994

Species
- See text.

= Ironopolia =

Genus of moths

Ironopolia is a genus of moths of the family Oecophoridae.

== Species ==
- Ironopolia ebenosticta (Turner, 1946)
- Ironopolia neochlora (Meyrick, 1883)
- Ironopolia sobriella (Walker, 1864)
- Ironopolia stygnodes (Turner, 1946)
