= Machimia peperita =

Scientific classification
- Domain: Eukaryota
- Kingdom: Animalia
- Phylum: Arthropoda
- Class: Insecta
- Order: Lepidoptera
- Family: Depressariidae
- Genus: Machimia
- Species: M. peperita

Binomial name
- Machimia peperita (Walsingham, 1912)

Synonyms
- Cryptolechia peperita Walsingham, 1912

Species of moth

Machimia peperita is a moth in the family Depressariidae. It was described by Thomas de Grey, 6th Baron Walsingham, in 1912. It is found in Guatemala.

The wingspan is about 25 mm. The forewings are creamy whitish above the fold, blending to brownish creamy and very pale fawn-brownish outwardly and dorsally, speckled throughout, but especially beyond the cell, with abruptly square-ended brownish scale-points. There is a diffused, transverse, small smoky fuscous patch at the end of the cell and a less conspicuous spot, a little beyond the middle of the cell, diffused and widened upward to the costa, where it merges in a narrow shade of fawn-brownish extending to the base and apex. There is a series of brownish fuscous dots around the termen and an outwardly curved transverse shade somewhat beyond the cell and a slight cloud beyond the middle of the fold are scarcely darker than the brownish creamy surrounding the wing. The hindwings are shining, very pale brownish cinereous, sparsely and inconspicuously speckled with single scales of a darker hue.
