= Machimia morata =

Scientific classification
- Kingdom: Animalia
- Phylum: Arthropoda
- Class: Insecta
- Order: Lepidoptera
- Family: Depressariidae
- Genus: Machimia
- Species: M. morata

Binomial name
- Machimia morata Meyrick, 1911

Species of moth

Machimia morata is a moth in the family Depressariidae. It was described by Edward Meyrick in 1911. It is found in Argentina.

The wingspan is 13–15 mm. The forewings are whitish ochreous, sprinkled with fuscous. The stigmata is blackish and there is a curved series of dark fuscous dots near the margin. The hindwings are ochreous grey whitish.
