= Machimia perianthes =

Scientific classification
- Kingdom: Animalia
- Phylum: Arthropoda
- Class: Insecta
- Order: Lepidoptera
- Family: Depressariidae
- Genus: Machimia
- Species: M. perianthes

Binomial name
- Machimia perianthes Meyrick, 1922

Species of moth

Machimia perianthes is a moth in the family Depressariidae. It was described by Edward Meyrick in 1922. It is found in French Guiana.
