= Machimia oxybela =

Scientific classification
- Kingdom: Animalia
- Phylum: Arthropoda
- Class: Insecta
- Order: Lepidoptera
- Family: Depressariidae
- Genus: Machimia
- Species: M. oxybela

Binomial name
- Machimia oxybela Meyrick, 1931

Species of moth

Machimia oxybela is a moth in the family Depressariidae. It was described by Edward Meyrick in 1931. It is found in Brazil.
