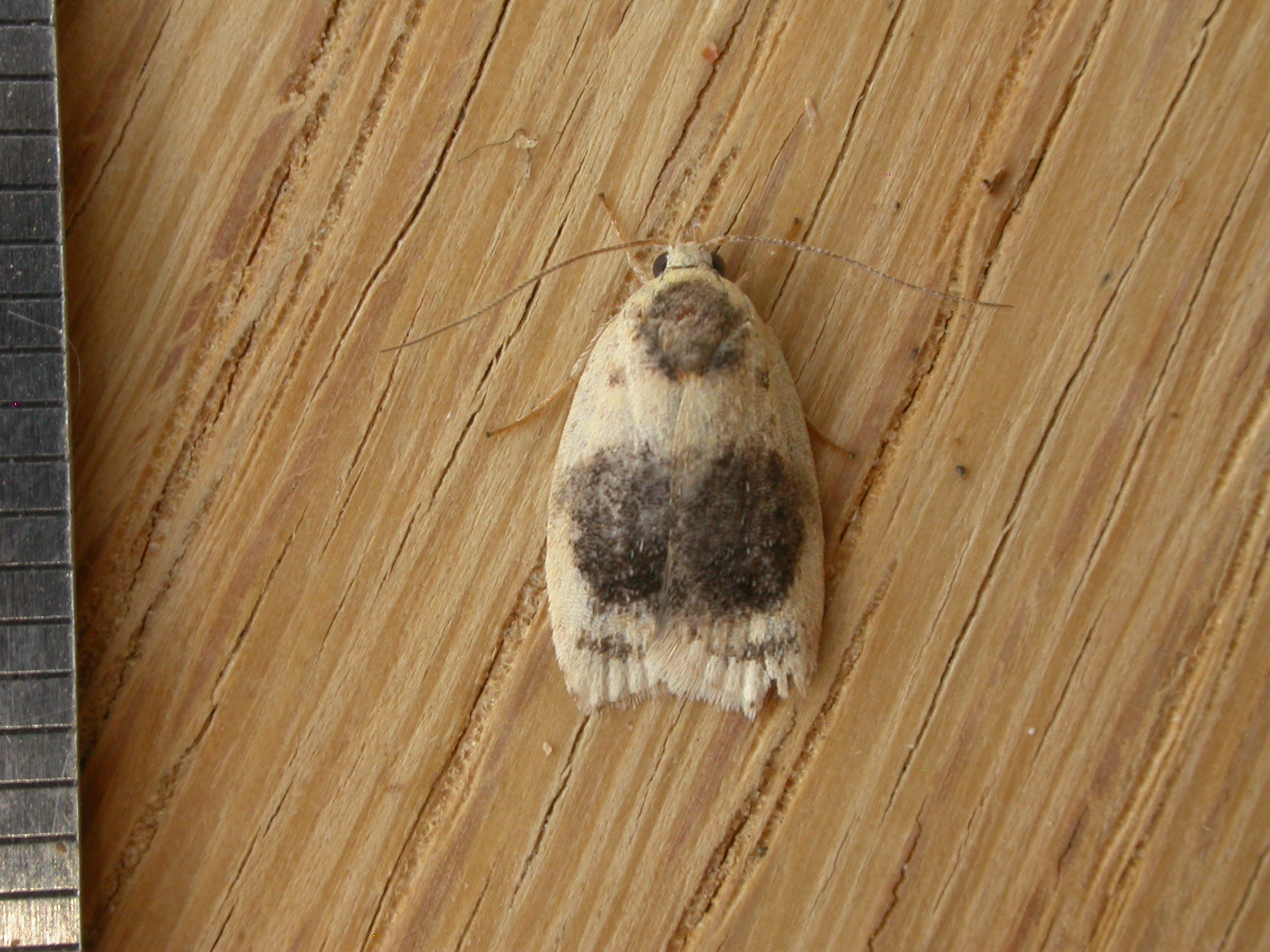

Scientific classification
- Kingdom: Animalia
- Phylum: Arthropoda
- Clade: Pancrustacea
- Class: Insecta
- Order: Lepidoptera
- Family: Oecophoridae
- Genus: Garrha
- Species: G. ocellifera

Binomial name
- Garrha ocellifera (Meyrick, 1883)

Synonyms
- Euryplaca ocellifera Meyrick, 1883

= Garrha ocellifera =

Species of moth

Garrha ocellifera is a moth of the family Oecophoridae. It is found in Australia, where it has been recorded from Queensland, New South Wales, the Australian Capital Territory, Victoria and Tasmania.

The wingspan is about 14.5–17 mm. The forewings are pale ochreous, with a small cloudy dark purplish-fuscous semi-oval spot on the inner margin near the base and a large roundish well-defined dark purplish-fuscous blotch in the middle of the disc. Within this blotch are two rather large roundish spots of whitish blue scales mixed with blackish, each surrounded by a suffused blackish ring. Between the blotch and the apex is an outwardly-curved cloudy dark fuscous transverse line and there are two or three dark fuscous-grey scales on the hindmargin around the apex. The hindwings are dark fuscous-grey, but whitish-ochreous towards the base and costa.

The larvae feed on dead leaves Angophora costata. Pupation takes place in the case.
