= Machimia ignicolor =

Scientific classification
- Domain: Eukaryota
- Kingdom: Animalia
- Phylum: Arthropoda
- Class: Insecta
- Order: Lepidoptera
- Family: Depressariidae
- Genus: Machimia
- Species: M. ignicolor

Binomial name
- Machimia ignicolor (Busck, 1914)

Synonyms
- Cryptolechia ignicolor Busck, 1914

Species of moth

Machimia ignicolor is a moth in the family Depressariidae. It was described by August Busck in 1914. It is found in Panama.

The wingspan is about 28 mm. The basal two-thirds of the forewings is light yellow, overlaid with carmine scales, while the outer third is dark violet red mixed with brown and carmine. The costal edge is blackish brown from the base to the apex and there is a curved blackish-brown line at the end of the cell. The hindwings are light carmine red.
