= Machimia caduca =

Scientific classification
- Kingdom: Animalia
- Phylum: Arthropoda
- Class: Insecta
- Order: Lepidoptera
- Family: Depressariidae
- Genus: Machimia
- Species: M. caduca

Binomial name
- Machimia caduca (Walsingham, 1912)

Synonyms
- Cryptolechia caduca Walsingham, 1912

Species of moth

Machimia caduca is a moth in the family Depressariidae. It was described by Thomas de Grey, 6th Baron Walsingham, in 1912. It is found in Guatemala.

The wingspan is about 24 mm. The forewings are tawny vinous with smoky blackish scales concentrated in the two discal spots (one at the end of the cell and the other halfway between this and the base) and in an outwardly bowed line on the outer fourth of the wing, parallel to the apex and termen. This line is only faintly indicated. There is a small, pale straw-ochreous patch at the extreme base and the extreme edge of the costa is also slightly tinged with ochreous. The hindwings are pale brownish cinereous.
