= Machimia rogifera =

Scientific classification
- Domain: Eukaryota
- Kingdom: Animalia
- Phylum: Arthropoda
- Class: Insecta
- Order: Lepidoptera
- Family: Depressariidae
- Genus: Machimia
- Species: M. rogifera

Binomial name
- Machimia rogifera Meyrick, 1914

Species of moth

Machimia rogifera is a moth in the family Depressariidae. It was described by Edward Meyrick in 1914. It is found in Guyana.

The wingspan is about 8 mm (0.31 in). The forewings are light yellow ochreous, suffused with ferruginous along the median portion of the costa. There is a slender black supramedian streak from the base to one-third, the space between this and the dorsum suffused with fuscous. There is also a large dark fuscous trapezoidal blotch extending on the dorsum from the middle to near the tornus, rather narrowed upwards and reaching across wing for four-fifths, edged with black and then with whitish. The hindwings are blackish grey.
