= Machimia ochrophanes =

Scientific classification
- Domain: Eukaryota
- Kingdom: Animalia
- Phylum: Arthropoda
- Class: Insecta
- Order: Lepidoptera
- Family: Depressariidae
- Genus: Machimia
- Species: M. ochrophanes

Binomial name
- Machimia ochrophanes Turner, 1916

Species of moth

Machimia ochrophanes is a moth in the family Depressariidae. It was described by Alfred Jefferis Turner in 1916. It is found in Australia, where it has been recorded from Queensland.

The wingspan is 19–23 mm. The forewings are pale ochreous-whitish, in females suffused with grey. The discal dots are obscure and there sometimes is a fuscous dot above the middle. There is a dot at two-thirds and sometimes another at one-third and another beyond it on the fold. The hindwings are ochreous grey-whitish, but darker in females.
