= Machimia anthracospora =

Scientific classification
- Kingdom: Animalia
- Phylum: Arthropoda
- Class: Insecta
- Order: Lepidoptera
- Family: Depressariidae
- Genus: Machimia
- Species: M. anthracospora

Binomial name
- Machimia anthracospora Meyrick, 1934

Species of moth

Machimia anthracospora is a moth in the family Depressariidae. It was described by Edward Meyrick in 1934. It is found in Brazil.
