= Machimia trigama =

Scientific classification
- Kingdom: Animalia
- Phylum: Arthropoda
- Class: Insecta
- Order: Lepidoptera
- Family: Depressariidae
- Genus: Machimia
- Species: M. trigama

Binomial name
- Machimia trigama (Meyrick, 1928)

Synonyms
- Cryptolechia trigama Meyrick, 1928

Species of moth

Machimia trigama is a moth in the family Depressariidae. It was described by Edward Meyrick in 1928. It is found in Mexico and the southern United States, where it has been recorded from Texas.

The wingspan is about 20 mm. The forewings are light gray with some scattered black scales. There is a small black spot on the base of the costa and a triangular blackish spot on the costa before the middle, as well as some blackish suffusion beneath and confluent with it. The plical and first discal stigmata form small black spots and the second discal spot forms a blackish-gray blotch. There are two strongly angulated series of small irregular black dots crossing the wing posteriorly, as well as five blackish dots on the posterior part of the costa, and a terminal series. The hindwings are light gray.
