= Machimia dolopis =

Scientific classification
- Domain: Eukaryota
- Kingdom: Animalia
- Phylum: Arthropoda
- Class: Insecta
- Order: Lepidoptera
- Family: Depressariidae
- Genus: Machimia
- Species: M. dolopis

Binomial name
- Machimia dolopis Walsingham, 1912

Synonyms
- Cryptolechia dolopis Walsingham, 1912

Species of moth

Machimia dolopis is a moth in the family Depressariidae. It was described by Thomas de Grey, 6th Baron Walsingham, in 1912. It is found in Mexico (Guerrero).

The wingspan is 15–17 mm. The forewings are smoky white, with minute fuscous dusting on a white ground colour. There is a narrow fuscous costal line at the base of the wing and a smoky fuscous discal spot at one-third, with a spot in the fold below and beyond it, which is followed by a larger ill-defined spot at the end of the cell. Straight below this is another plical spot, diffused downward to the dorsum and forming the lower extremity of a series of smoky fuscous spots, which, running parallel with the termen, form an angle pointing to the apex and revert to the costa at about two-thirds. The hindwings are shining whitish cinereous.
