= Machimia miltosparsa =

Scientific classification
- Kingdom: Animalia
- Phylum: Arthropoda
- Class: Insecta
- Order: Lepidoptera
- Family: Depressariidae
- Genus: Machimia
- Species: M. miltosparsa

Binomial name
- Machimia miltosparsa (Turner, 1914)

Synonyms
- Hoplitica miltosparsa Turner, 1914

Species of moth

Machimia miltosparsa is a moth in the family Depressariidae. It was described by Alfred Jefferis Turner in 1914. It is found in Australia, where it has been recorded from New South Wales.

The wingspan is about 22 mm. The forewings are whitish-grey, irrorated with brick red and with pale fuscous markings. The costal edge is whitish and there is a minute dot in the disc at one-fourth, a second beyond it on the fold and a third in the middle. There is a slender dentate line from the midcosta outwards, curved to the dorsum before the tornus. There is a series of small dots on the apical fourth of the costa and on the termen. The hindwings are grey-whitish.
