= Machimia conspersa =

Scientific classification
- Domain: Eukaryota
- Kingdom: Animalia
- Phylum: Arthropoda
- Class: Insecta
- Order: Lepidoptera
- Family: Depressariidae
- Genus: Machimia
- Species: M. conspersa

Binomial name
- Machimia conspersa Turner, 1946

Species of moth

Machimia conspersa is a moth in the family Depressariidae. It was described by Alfred Jefferis Turner in 1946. It is found in Australia, where it has been recorded from Victoria.
