= Machimia desertorum =

Scientific classification
- Domain: Eukaryota
- Kingdom: Animalia
- Phylum: Arthropoda
- Class: Insecta
- Order: Lepidoptera
- Family: Depressariidae
- Genus: Machimia
- Species: M. desertorum

Binomial name
- Machimia desertorum (Berg, 1875)

Synonyms
- Depressaria desertorum Berg, 1875

Species of moth

Machimia desertorum is a moth in the family Depressariidae. It is found in Patagonia.

The wingspan is about 17 mm for males and 19 mm for females. The forewings are yellowish-grey with a reddish tinge and dark scales. The hindwings are shining whitish.
