= Garrha rufimaculella =

Scientific classification
- Kingdom: Animalia
- Phylum: Arthropoda
- Clade: Pancrustacea
- Class: Insecta
- Order: Lepidoptera
- Family: Oecophoridae
- Genus: Garrha
- Species: G. rufimaculella

Binomial name
- Garrha rufimaculella (Turner, 1896)

Synonyms
- Hoplitica rufimaculella Turner, 1896

Species of moth

Garrha rufimaculella is a moth in the family Oecophoridae. It was described by Alfred Jefferis Turner in 1896. It is found in Australia, where it has been recorded from Queensland.

The wingspan is about 19 mm. The forewings are pinkish-ochreous, with scattered scales of a deeper pink forming indistinct markings and a dot in the disc before the middle, a second beyond the middle and a faintly indicated line from the middle of the costa obliquely outwards, sharply bent in the disc at five sixths, and continued parallel to the hindmargin to the inner-margin before the anal angle. There are many faint pink dots along the hindmargin, and in the disc showing a tendency to form anterior and median lines. The hindwings are whitish, tinged with grey towards the hindmargin.
