= Prodelaca biseriata =

Scientific classification
- Kingdom: Animalia
- Phylum: Arthropoda
- Class: Insecta
- Order: Lepidoptera
- Family: Oecophoridae
- Genus: Prodelaca
- Species: P. biseriata

Binomial name
- Prodelaca biseriata (Meyrick, 1920)

Synonyms
- Machimia biseriata Meyrick, 1920

Species of moth

Prodelaca biseriata is a moth in the family Oecophoridae. It was described by Edward Meyrick in 1920. It is found in Australia, where it has been recorded from Queensland.

The wingspan is about 17 mm. The forewings are pale ochreous grey, darker speckled with a faint pinkish tinge. The costal edge is whitish ochreous except towards the base. The stigmata is dark grey, with the plical somewhat beyond the first discal. There are also two excurved series of cloudy dark grey dots, first from beneath the costa at one-third to the second discal stigma, beneath this forming a loop with three exterior dots larger and more strongly marked, then to near the dorsum at two-thirds, second from beneath the costa at three-fifths to nearly midway between the second discal stigma and the apex, then curved to the tornus. There is a terminal series of dark fuscous dots. The hindwings are light greyish, darker towards the apex.
