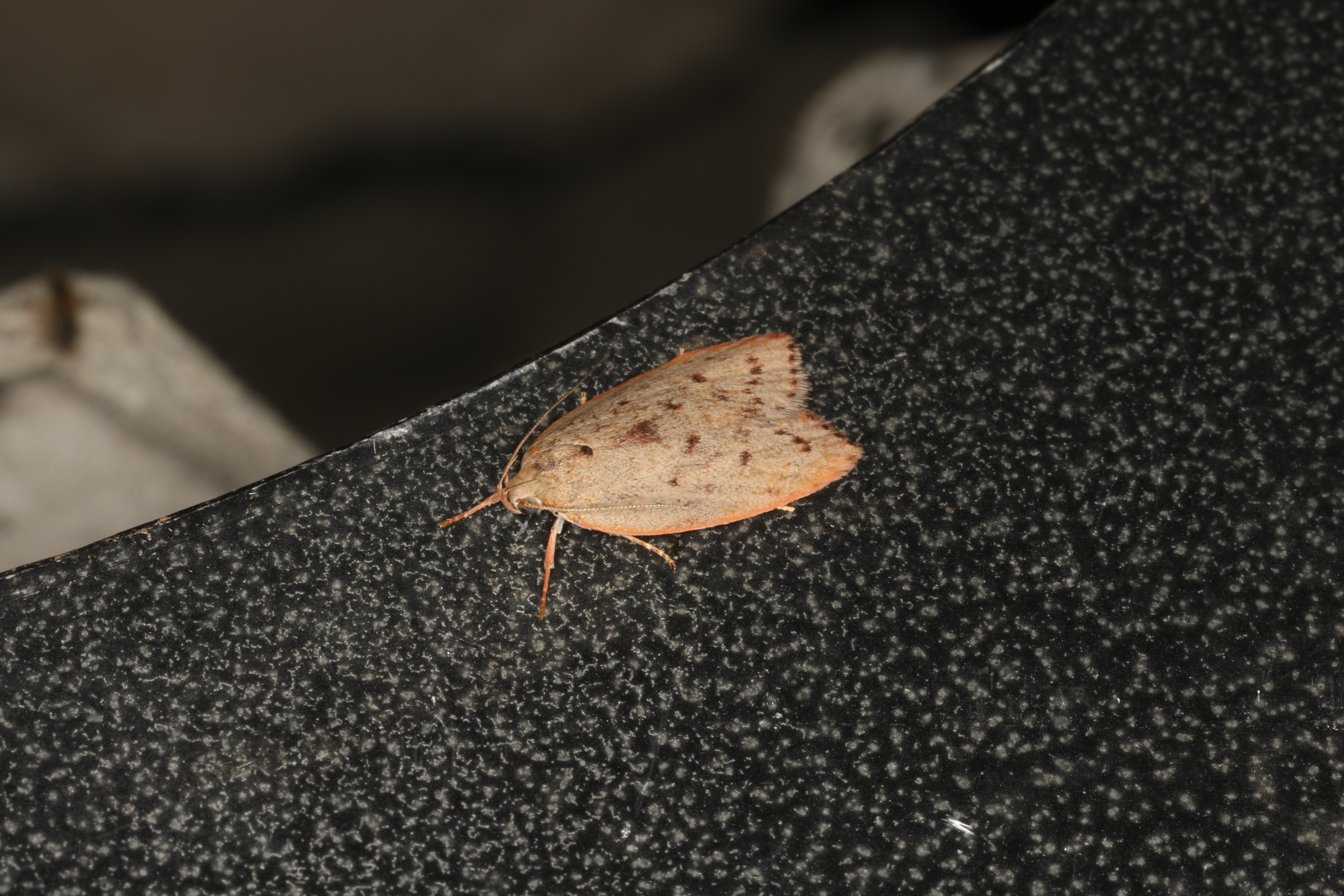

Scientific classification
- Kingdom: Animalia
- Phylum: Arthropoda
- Clade: Pancrustacea
- Class: Insecta
- Order: Lepidoptera
- Family: Oecophoridae
- Genus: Garrha
- Species: G. absumptella

Binomial name
- Garrha absumptella (Walker, 1864)

Synonyms
- Depressaria absumptella Walker, 1864; Machimia similis Turner, 1946

= Garrha absumptella =

Species of moth

Garrha absumptella is a moth in the family Oecophoridae, described by Francis Walker in 1864. It can be found in Australia, where it has been recorded from New South Wales and Tasmania.

The wingspan is 22–25 mm (0.87–0.98 in).
