= Garrha achroa =

Scientific classification
- Kingdom: Animalia
- Phylum: Arthropoda
- Clade: Pancrustacea
- Class: Insecta
- Order: Lepidoptera
- Family: Oecophoridae
- Genus: Garrha
- Species: G. achroa

Binomial name
- Garrha achroa (Turner, 1896)

Synonyms
- Heliocausta achroa Turner, 1896

Species of moth

Garrha achroa is a moth in the family Oecophoridae. It was described by Alfred Jefferis Turner in 1896. It is found in Australia, where it has been recorded from Queensland and Western Australia.

The wingspan is about 20 mm. The forewings are whitish-grey, with fuscous markings and a row of minute dots from the costa about the middle towards the hindmargin, sharply bent in the disc at five-sixths, and continued parallel to the hindmargin to inner margin. There are a few scattered fuscous scales in the disc and there is a row of dots along the costa from four-fifths to the apex, and along the hindmargin to the anal angle. The hindwings are grey.
