= Garrha amata =

Scientific classification
- Kingdom: Animalia
- Phylum: Arthropoda
- Clade: Pancrustacea
- Class: Insecta
- Order: Lepidoptera
- Family: Oecophoridae
- Genus: Garrha
- Species: G. amata

Binomial name
- Garrha amata (Meyrick, 1914)

Synonyms
- Machimia amata Meyrick, 1914

Species of moth

Garrha amata is a moth in the family Oecophoridae. It was described by Edward Meyrick in 1914. It is found in Australia, where it has been recorded from Western Australia.

The wingspan is about 24 mm. The forewings are light rosy ochreous, along the costa more rosy tinged. The stigmata is minute and crimson, the plical spot is placed obliquely beyond the first discal spot. The hindwings are ochreous whitish, towards the apex suffused with pale rosy.
