= Prionocris mollis =

Scientific classification
- Kingdom: Animalia
- Phylum: Arthropoda
- Class: Insecta
- Order: Lepidoptera
- Family: Oecophoridae
- Genus: Prionocris
- Species: P. mollis

Binomial name
- Prionocris mollis (Turner, 1946)

Synonyms
- Machimia mollis Turner, 1946

Species of moth

Prionocris mollis is a moth in the family Oecophoridae. It was described by Turner in 1946. It is found in Australia, where it has been recorded from New South Wales.
