= Garrha mitescens =

Scientific classification
- Kingdom: Animalia
- Phylum: Arthropoda
- Clade: Pancrustacea
- Class: Insecta
- Order: Lepidoptera
- Family: Oecophoridae
- Genus: Garrha
- Species: G. mitescens

Binomial name
- Garrha mitescens (Meyrick, 1914)

Synonyms
- Machimia mitescens Meyrick, 1914

Species of moth

Garrha mitescens is a moth in the family Oecophoridae. It was described by Edward Meyrick in 1914. It is found in Australia, where it has been recorded from Queensland and the Northern Territory.

The wingspan is 16–21 mm. The forewings are ochreous suffusedly irrorated (sprinkled) with grey, along the costa rosy tinged. The stigmata is obscure, darker grey, the plical spot slightly beyond the first discal, both of these sometimes almost obsolete. Sometimes, there is an irregular transverse series of several obscure spots of grey suffusion at about one-third and halfway. There is an angulated series of obscure dark fuscous dots from two-thirds of the costa to the tornus and sometimes obscure dark fuscous dots along the posterior part of the costa and termen. The hindwings are light greyish yellow ochreous, sometimes greyer towards the apex and termen.
