= Garrha atoecha =

Scientific classification
- Kingdom: Animalia
- Phylum: Arthropoda
- Clade: Pancrustacea
- Class: Insecta
- Order: Lepidoptera
- Family: Oecophoridae
- Genus: Garrha
- Species: G. atoecha

Binomial name
- Garrha atoecha (Meyrick, 1886)

Synonyms
- Heliocausta atoecha Meyrick, 1886; Hoplitica eoxantha Turner, 1896; Hoplitica habroptera Lower, 1900; Machimia loxomita Turner, 1946

Species of moth

Garrha atoecha is a moth in the family Oecophoridae. It was described by Edward Meyrick in 1886. It is found in Australia, where it has been recorded from New South Wales and Queensland.

The wingspan is 19–23 mm. The forewings are whitish, thickly irrorated (sprinkled) with red scales. The costal edge is red, the extreme edge whitish. The markings are purplish fuscous and indistinct. There is a discal dot at two-fifths, and a second at four-fifths, as well as three indistinctly suffused transverse lines, all partially obsolete, first at one-fifth, second just posterior to the first and the third through the second dot, distinct on the costa. A fourth line runs parallel to the hindmargin and is indistinct towards the costa. There is a row of suffused dots along the hindmargin. The hindwings are yellow.
