= Sclerocris styphlodes =

Scientific classification
- Kingdom: Animalia
- Phylum: Arthropoda
- Class: Insecta
- Order: Lepidoptera
- Family: Oecophoridae
- Genus: Sclerocris
- Species: S. styphlodes

Binomial name
- Sclerocris styphlodes (Turner, 1946)

Synonyms
- Hoplomorpha styphlodes Turner, 1946

Species of moth

Sclerocris styphlodes is a moth in the family Oecophoridae. It was described by Turner in 1946. It is found in Australia, where it has been recorded from Queensland.

The wingspan is 21–26 mm. The forewings are pale fuscous with dark fuscous dots and with a whitish costal edge. The discal spots are approximated, the first discal at one-third, the plical beneath it and the second discal at the middle. There is a curved subterminal line of minute dots, sometimes indistinct. The hindwings are grey.
