= Garrha mesogaea =

Scientific classification
- Kingdom: Animalia
- Phylum: Arthropoda
- Clade: Pancrustacea
- Class: Insecta
- Order: Lepidoptera
- Family: Oecophoridae
- Genus: Garrha
- Species: G. mesogaea

Binomial name
- Garrha mesogaea (Turner, 1916)

Synonyms
- Machimia mesogaea Turner, 1916

Species of moth

Garrha mesogaea is a moth in the family Oecophoridae. It was described by Alfred Jefferis Turner in 1916. It is found in Australia, where it has been recorded from Queensland.

The wingspan is 14–18 mm. The forewings are ochreous-grey-whitish, the discal spots obsolete, or one or two spots faintly indicated. The costal edge is pink.
