= Garrha ochra =

Scientific classification
- Kingdom: Animalia
- Phylum: Arthropoda
- Clade: Pancrustacea
- Class: Insecta
- Order: Lepidoptera
- Family: Oecophoridae
- Genus: Garrha
- Species: G. ochra

Binomial name
- Garrha ochra (Turner, 1946)

Synonyms
- Machimia ochra Turner, 1946

Species of moth

Garrha ochra is a moth in the family Oecophoridae. It was described by Alfred Jefferis Turner in 1946. It is found in Australia, where it has been recorded from Western Australia.

The wingspan is 28–32 mm. The forewings are pale greyish-ochreous faintly tinged reddish and with a rosy costal line leaving the extreme edge whitish. The markings are pale fuscous, often faint or absent and there is a dentate line from one-fourth of the costa to the mid-dorsum, as well as a line of dots from the costa beyond the middle to four-fifths, there bent to the end of the dorsum before the tornus. There is also a terminal series of dots. The hindwings are whitish.
