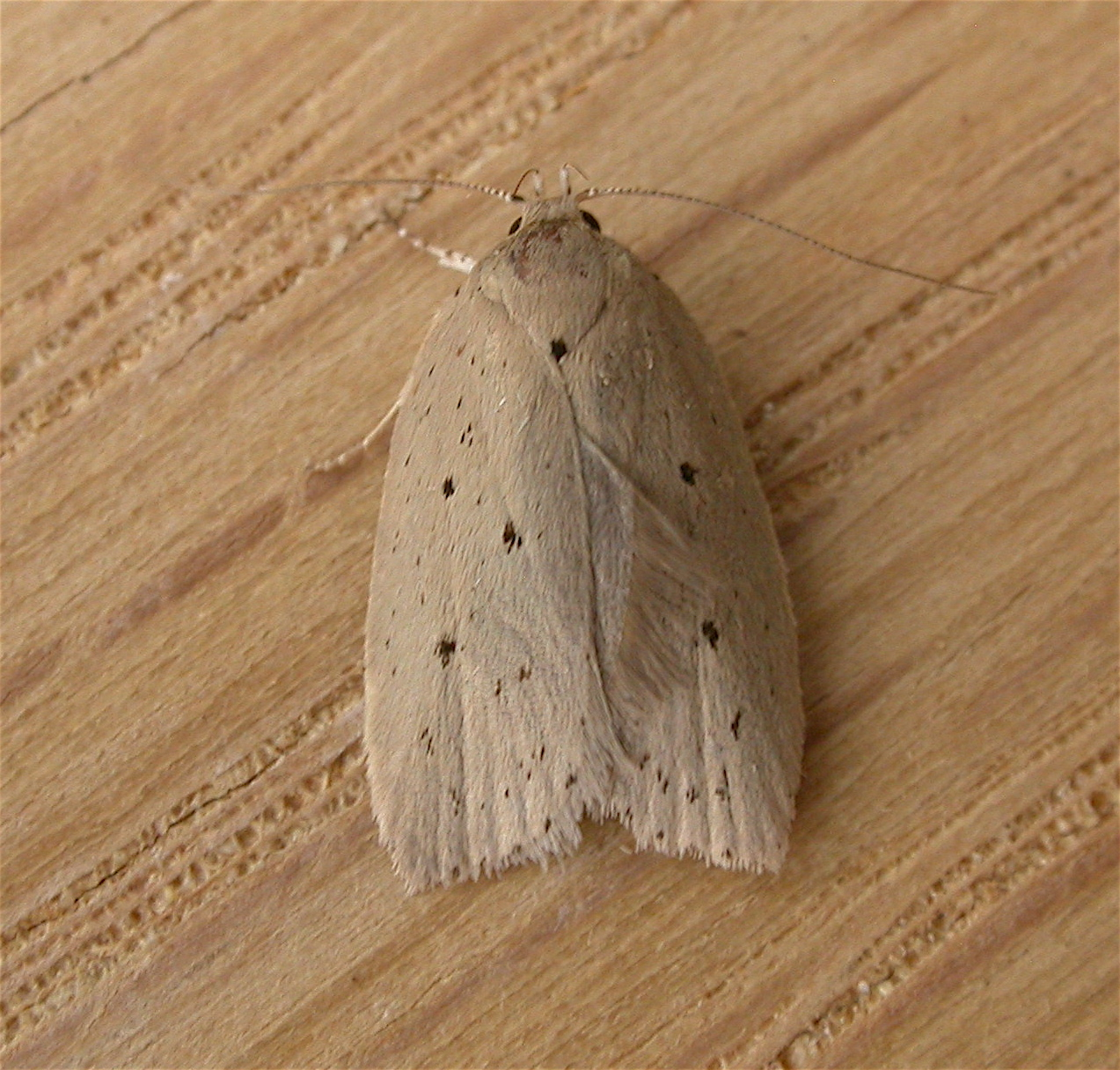

Scientific classification
- Kingdom: Animalia
- Phylum: Arthropoda
- Class: Insecta
- Order: Lepidoptera
- Family: Oecophoridae
- Genus: Ironopolia
- Species: I. sobriella

Binomial name
- Ironopolia sobriella (Walker, 1863)

Synonyms
- Depressaria sobriella Walker, 1864

= Ironopolia sobriella =

Species of moth

Ironopolia sobriella is a moth of the family Oecophoridae. It is found in Australia, where it has been recorded from Queensland, New South Wales, the Australian Capital Territory, Victoria, South Australia and Western Australia. The species was described by Francis Walker in 1863.

The wingspan is about 20 mm.
