= Hoplomorpha caminodes =

Scientific classification
- Kingdom: Animalia
- Phylum: Arthropoda
- Class: Insecta
- Order: Lepidoptera
- Family: Oecophoridae
- Genus: Hoplomorpha
- Species: H. caminodes

Binomial name
- Hoplomorpha caminodes Turner, 1916

Synonyms
- Machimia caminodes

Species of moth

Hoplomorpha caminodes is a moth in the family Oecophoridae. It was described by Alfred Jefferis Turner in 1916. It is found in Australia, where it has been recorded from Queensland.

The wingspan is 13–15 mm. The forewings are pale reddish ochreous, darker towards the costa and with a dark reddish dorsal streak, edged with whitish, from one-fifth to four-fifths, abruptly truncated posteriorly. A fuscous spot, indented posteriorly, is found before the tornus, from this a reddish-ochreous suffusion containing two minute fuscous dots extends more than halfway across the disc beyond the middle, and is preceded by a whitish dot. There is a short, outwardly oblique, reddish-ochreous streak from three-fourths of the costa and an interrupted, fuscous line from beneath the costa to the termen above the tornus. There is also a fine, fuscous terminal line. The hindwings are dark grey, towards the base ochreous whitish.
