= Garrha brachytricha =

Scientific classification
- Kingdom: Animalia
- Phylum: Arthropoda
- Clade: Pancrustacea
- Class: Insecta
- Order: Lepidoptera
- Family: Oecophoridae
- Genus: Garrha
- Species: G. brachytricha

Binomial name
- Garrha brachytricha (Turner, 1927)

Synonyms
- Machimia brachytricha Turner, 1927

Species of moth

Garrha brachytricha is a moth in the family Oecophoridae. It was described by Alfred Jefferis Turner in 1927. It is found in Australia, where it has been recorded from Tasmania.

The forewings are ochreous-pink, inclining to pale brick-red.
