= Garrha repandula =

Scientific classification
- Kingdom: Animalia
- Phylum: Arthropoda
- Clade: Pancrustacea
- Class: Insecta
- Order: Lepidoptera
- Family: Oecophoridae
- Genus: Garrha
- Species: G. repandula

Binomial name
- Garrha repandula (Zeller, 1855)

Synonyms
- Cryptolechia repandula Zeller, 1855; Cryptolechia scitipunctella Walker, 1869

Species of moth

Garrha repandula is a moth in the family Oecophoridae. It was described by Philipp Christoph Zeller in 1855. It is found in Australia, where it has been recorded from South Australia and Tasmania.
