= Brachynemata restricta =

Scientific classification
- Kingdom: Animalia
- Phylum: Arthropoda
- Class: Insecta
- Order: Lepidoptera
- Family: Oecophoridae
- Genus: Brachynemata
- Species: B. restricta

Binomial name
- Brachynemata restricta (Meyrick, 1920)

Synonyms
- Machimia restricta Meyrick, 1920

Species of moth

Brachynemata restricta is a moth in the family Oecophoridae. It was described by Edward Meyrick in 1920. It is found in Australia, where it has been recorded from Queensland.

The wingspan is 18–19 mm. The forewings are pale ochreous grey, the extreme costal edge tinged with whitish. The markings are blackish. There is a minute dot on the costa near the base, a dot towards the costa near the base and the stigmata is moderate, with the plical rather beyond the first discal spot. There is a more or less developed strongly curved series of minute irregular dots from beneath the costa at one-third, traversing the second discal stigma to above the dorsum at two-thirds. There is also a series of somewhat larger dots from beneath the middle of the costa very obliquely outwards to a point nearer to the apex than to the second discal stigma, then angulated and slightly curved to the dorsum before the tornus. A marginal row of dots is found round the apical third of the costa and termen. The hindwings are grey, towards the base paler and tinged whitish ochreous.
