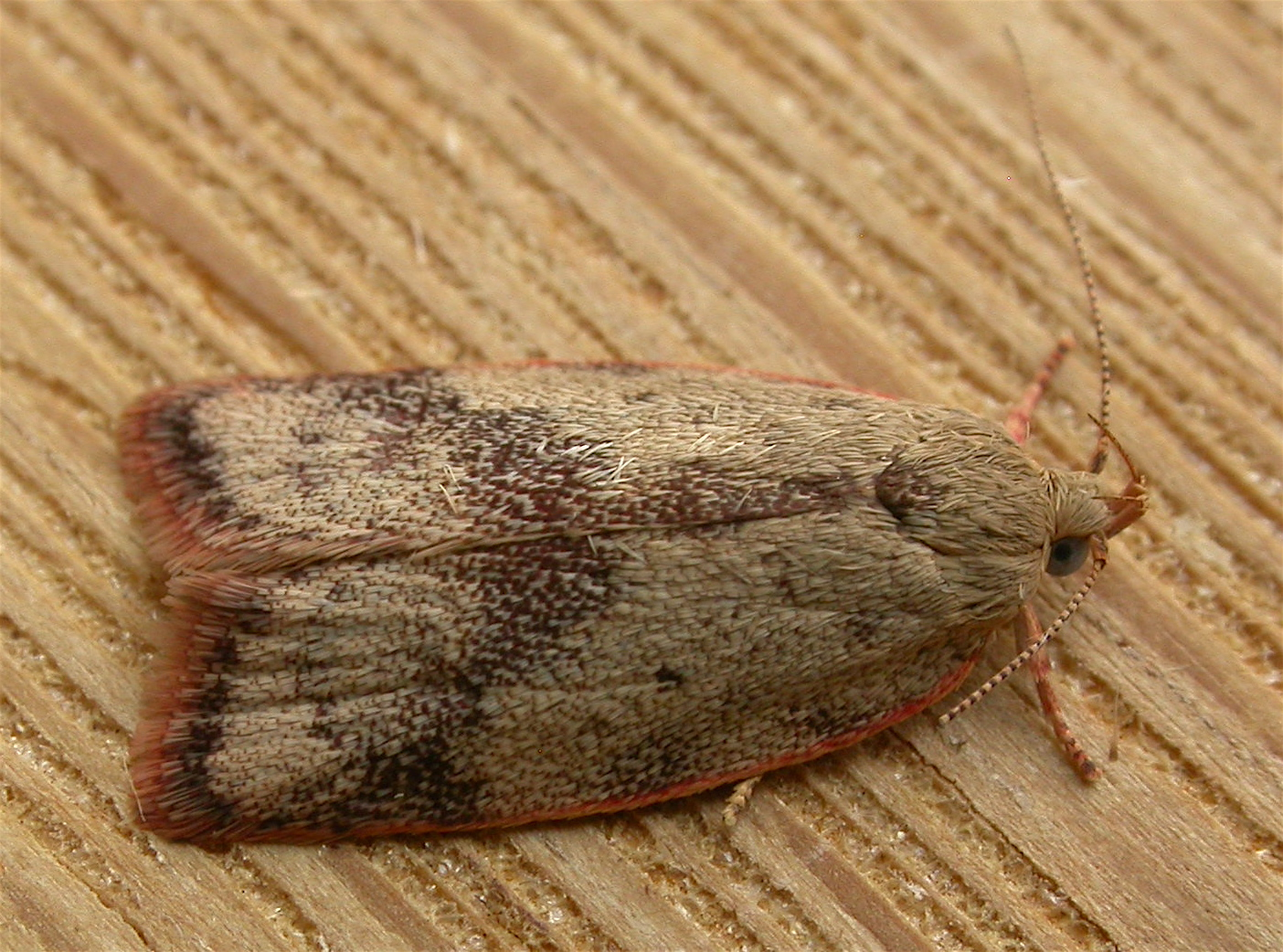

Scientific classification
- Kingdom: Animalia
- Phylum: Arthropoda
- Clade: Pancrustacea
- Class: Insecta
- Order: Lepidoptera
- Family: Oecophoridae
- Genus: Garrha
- Species: G. limbata

Binomial name
- Garrha limbata (Meyrick, 1883)

Synonyms
- Heliocausta limbata Meyrick, 1883

= Garrha limbata =

Species of moth

Garrha limbata is a moth of the family Oecophoridae. It is found in Australia, where it has been recorded from Queensland, New South Wales, the Australian Capital Territory, Victoria and South Australia.

The wingspan is about 18 mm. The forewings are reddish fuscous with ochreous whitish scales and a dark fuscous dot in the disc before the middle, a second in the disc beyond the middle (connected with the first by a line of ochreous whitish scales) and a third on the fold. The hindwings are yellow, the apex and hindmargin broadly suffused with blackish grey.
