= Enoplidia stenomorpha =

Scientific classification
- Kingdom: Animalia
- Phylum: Arthropoda
- Class: Insecta
- Order: Lepidoptera
- Family: Oecophoridae
- Genus: Enoplidia
- Species: E. stenomorpha

Binomial name
- Enoplidia stenomorpha (Turner, 1946)

Synonyms
- Machimia stenomorpha Turner, 1946

Species of moth in genus Enoplidia

Enoplidia stenomorpha is a moth in the family Oecophoridae. It was described by Alfred Jefferis Turner in 1946. It is found in Australia, where it has been recorded from Queensland.

The wingspan is about 15 mm. The forewings are pale ochreous with fuscous markings. The first discal spot is found at one-third, the plical slightly beyond it, both minute and the second larger dorsal is found before two-thirds. There is a slender gently curved line from four-fifths of the costa to the tornus. The hindwings are pale grey.
