= Enoplidia simplex =

Scientific classification
- Kingdom: Animalia
- Phylum: Arthropoda
- Class: Insecta
- Order: Lepidoptera
- Family: Oecophoridae
- Genus: Enoplidia
- Species: E. simplex

Binomial name
- Enoplidia simplex (Turner, 1896)

Synonyms
- Heliocausta simplex Turner, 1896; Heliocausta plausibilis Meyrick, 1913; Heliocausta sarcophaea Meyrick, 1921; Machimia stenorrhoda Turner, 1946

Species of moth in genus Enoplidia

Enoplidia simplex is a moth in the family Oecophoridae. It was described by Alfred Jefferis Turner in 1896. It is found in Australia, where it has been recorded from Queensland, New South Wales and Victoria.

The wingspan is about 20 mm.
