= Garrha moderatella =

Scientific classification
- Kingdom: Animalia
- Phylum: Arthropoda
- Clade: Pancrustacea
- Class: Insecta
- Order: Lepidoptera
- Family: Oecophoridae
- Genus: Garrha
- Species: G. moderatella

Binomial name
- Garrha moderatella (Walker, 1864)

Synonyms
- Depressaria moderatella Walker, 1864; Hoplitica liosarca Meyrick, 1888

Species of moth

Garrha moderatella is a moth in the family Oecophoridae. It was described by Francis Walker in 1864. It is found in Australia, where it has been recorded from Victoria and Tasmania.

The wingspan is about 30 mm. The forewings are pale pinkish tan with a dull reddish dot in the disc at one-third, a second on the fold somewhat beyond the first. Both are very inconspicuous. There is a third more distinct dot in the disc beyond the middle and faint indications of a posterior series. The hindwings are pale ochreous grey.
