= Garrha platyporphyra =

Scientific classification
- Kingdom: Animalia
- Phylum: Arthropoda
- Clade: Pancrustacea
- Class: Insecta
- Order: Lepidoptera
- Family: Oecophoridae
- Genus: Garrha
- Species: G. platyporphyra

Binomial name
- Garrha platyporphyra (Turner, 1946)

Synonyms
- Machimia platyporphyra Turner, 1946

Species of moth

Garrha platyporphyra is a moth in the family Oecophoridae. It was described by Alfred Jefferis Turner in 1946. It is found in Australia, where it has been recorded from Queensland.
