= Hoplomorpha epicosma =

Scientific classification
- Kingdom: Animalia
- Phylum: Arthropoda
- Class: Insecta
- Order: Lepidoptera
- Family: Oecophoridae
- Genus: Hoplomorpha
- Species: H. epicosma

Binomial name
- Hoplomorpha epicosma Turner, 1916

Synonyms
- Machimia epicosma

Species of moth

Hoplomorpha epicosma is a moth in the family Oecophoridae. It was described by Alfred Jefferis Turner in 1916. It is found in Australia, where it has been recorded from Queensland.

The wingspan is 14–16 mm. The forewings are whitish, the base of the costa dark fuscous and the costal edge grey, with a short, oblique mark at two-fifths and a large, dark fuscous blotch on the inner margin from one-fourth to three-fourths, attenuated anteriorly, reaching to the fold, its upper edge concave, angulated at each extremity of the concavity. Along its posterior edge is a leaden-fuscous line, surmounted by a leaden-fuscous dot in the disc at two-thirds. There is an outwardly curved, fuscous line from the costa at three-fourths to the anal angle, its anterior edge suffused with greenish grey. Along its posterior edge is a narrow, white line not reaching to the anal angle and the apical area is purple fuscous, sprinkled with leaden-fuscous scales. The hindwings are ochreous whitish with the apical half fuscous.
