= Catacometes hemiscia =

Scientific classification
- Kingdom: Animalia
- Phylum: Arthropoda
- Class: Insecta
- Order: Lepidoptera
- Family: Oecophoridae
- Genus: Catacometes
- Species: C. hemiscia

Binomial name
- Catacometes hemiscia (Meyrick, 1883)

Synonyms
- Heliocausta hemiscia Meyrick, 1883; Machimia picturata Turner, 1946

Species of moth

Catacometes hemiscia is a moth in the family Oecophoridae. It was described by Edward Meyrick in 1883. It is found in Australia, where it has been recorded from New South Wales.

The wingspan is about 16 mm. The forewings are white, towards the costa faintly greyish tinged and with a dark fuscous blotch on the inner margin, extending almost from the base to two-fifths, terminated above by the fold, posteriorly lighter and ill defined. There is an ill-defined cloudy fuscous subquadrate blotch beyond this, extending on the inner margin from before the middle to three-fourths, reaching rather more than halfway across the wing. There is also a dark fuscous dot in the disc before the middle, confluent with the anterior angle of this blotch, and a small dark fuscous spot in the disc beyond middle, connected with the posterior edge of the blotch near the inner margin by a curved row of three smaller fuscous spots. There is a dark fuscous ill-defined partially interrupted transverse line from just below the costa at two-thirds to before the anal angle, angulated outwards in the disc. A straight suffused dark fuscous line is found from the costa a little before the apex to the hindmargin just above the anal angle, beyond which the ground colour is suffused with pale grey, forming a narrow hindmarginal band. The hindwings are whitish grey, towards the base whitish.
