= Stereoloba promiscua =

Scientific classification
- Kingdom: Animalia
- Phylum: Arthropoda
- Class: Insecta
- Order: Lepidoptera
- Family: Oecophoridae
- Genus: Stereoloba
- Species: S. promiscua

Binomial name
- Stereoloba promiscua (Meyrick, 1922)

Synonyms
- Capua promiscua Meyrick, 1922; Machimia lera Turner, 1946

Species of moth

Stereoloba promiscua is a moth in the family Oecophoridae. It was described by Edward Meyrick in 1922. It is found in Australia, where it has been recorded from Queensland.

The wingspan is about 14 mm. The forewings are white with fuscous markings. There is a basal costal dot and another at two-fifths, as well as a small costal triangle before the apex and a discal dot at two-thirds. The terminal edge is fuscous. The hindwings are whitish.
