= Garrha coccinea =

Scientific classification
- Kingdom: Animalia
- Phylum: Arthropoda
- Clade: Pancrustacea
- Class: Insecta
- Order: Lepidoptera
- Family: Oecophoridae
- Genus: Garrha
- Species: G. coccinea

Binomial name
- Garrha coccinea (Turner, 1917)

Synonyms
- Machimia coccinea Turner, 1917

Species of moth

Garrha coccinea is a moth in the family Oecophoridae. It was described by Alfred Jefferis Turner in 1917. It is found in Australia, where it has been recorded from Queensland.

The wingspan is about 20 mm. The forewings are red, slightly tinged with ochreous and without defined markings, but there are traces of two discal dots and a posterior line. The hindwings are pale-ochreous without a grey or fuscous tinge.
