= Garrha alma =

Scientific classification
- Kingdom: Animalia
- Phylum: Arthropoda
- Clade: Pancrustacea
- Class: Insecta
- Order: Lepidoptera
- Family: Oecophoridae
- Genus: Garrha
- Species: G. alma

Binomial name
- Garrha alma (Meyrick, 1914)

Synonyms
- Machimia alma Meyrick, 1914

Species of moth

Garrha alma is a moth in the family Oecophoridae. It was described by Edward Meyrick in 1914. It is found in Australia, where it has been recorded from Victoria.

The wingspan is 20–21 mm. The forewings are brownish, mixed with light rosy ochreous. The stigmata is very indistinct and fuscous, the discal spot somewhat approximated and the plical spot hardly beyond the first discal spot. The hindwings are grey, darker on the margin and mixed with pale yellowish on the posterior half of the disc.
