= Garrha atripunctatella =

Scientific classification
- Kingdom: Animalia
- Phylum: Arthropoda
- Clade: Pancrustacea
- Class: Insecta
- Order: Lepidoptera
- Family: Oecophoridae
- Genus: Garrha
- Species: G. atripunctatella

Binomial name
- Garrha atripunctatella Turner, 1896

Synonyms
- Hoplitica atripunctatella Turner, 1896

Species of moth

Garrha atripunctatella is a moth in the family Oecophoridae. It was described by Alfred Jefferis Turner in 1896. It is found in Australia, where it has been recorded from Queensland and New South Wales.

The wingspan is 19–22 mm. The forewings are pale pinkish-grey with jet-black markings. There is a discal dot before the middle, a second beyond the middle, a third on the fold obliquely beyond the first and a row of dots from the costa before the middle obliquely outwards, sharply bent in the disc at five-sixths, and continued to the hindmargin before the anal angle. There is also a very variable number of dots or scattered black scales in the disc and a row of black dots along the apical third of the costa and from the hindmargin to the anal angle. The hindwings are whitish, the apex and hindmargin sometimes pale-fuscous.

The larvae feed on the dead leaves of Eucalyptus signata.
