= Garrha agglomerata =

Scientific classification
- Kingdom: Animalia
- Phylum: Arthropoda
- Clade: Pancrustacea
- Class: Insecta
- Order: Lepidoptera
- Family: Oecophoridae
- Genus: Garrha
- Species: G. agglomerata

Binomial name
- Garrha agglomerata (Meyrick, 1920)

Synonyms
- Machimia agglomerata Meyrick, 1920

Species of moth

Garrha agglomerata is a moth in the family Oecophoridae. It was described by Edward Meyrick in 1920. It is found in Australia, where it has been recorded from South Australia.

The wingspan is about 23 mm. The forewings are light brownish grey, suffused with grey whitish posteriorly and with some scattered dark fuscous specks. There is a small suffused dark fuscous spot on the dorsum near the base and an elongate patch of purplish-fuscous irroration (sprinkles) extending along the dorsum from near beyond this to near the tornus. There is also a cloudy dark fuscous dot in the disc at one-fourth. The stigmata is large, dark fuscous, the plical spot slightly beyond the first discal spot. There is an undefined oblique shade of purplish-fuscous irroration from the costa at two-thirds traversing the first discal spot and a rather curved subterminal shade formed of small subconfluent spots of dark purplish-fuscous irroration from the costa at two-thirds to the tornus, as well as an elongate costal patch of purplish-fuscous suffusion beyond this. The hindwings are light grey.
