= Garrha phoenopis =

Scientific classification
- Kingdom: Animalia
- Phylum: Arthropoda
- Clade: Pancrustacea
- Class: Insecta
- Order: Lepidoptera
- Family: Oecophoridae
- Genus: Garrha
- Species: G. phoenopis

Binomial name
- Garrha phoenopis (Turner, 1916)

Synonyms
- Machimia phaenopis Turner, 1916

Species of moth

Garrha phoenopis is a moth in the family Oecophoridae. It was described by Alfred Jefferis Turner in 1916. It is found in Australia, where it has been recorded from Queensland and the Northern Territory.

The wingspan is 14–18 mm. The forewings are ochreous-whitish, mixed with dull reddish and the costal edge narrowly pink. There are no defined markings, but a redder, apical area preceded by an ill-defined, paler fascia from the mid-costa to the tornus. The hindwings are ochreous-fuscous, but fuscous towards apex.
