= Prionocris rhodopepla =

Scientific classification
- Kingdom: Animalia
- Phylum: Arthropoda
- Class: Insecta
- Order: Lepidoptera
- Family: Oecophoridae
- Genus: Prionocris
- Species: P. rhodopepla

Binomial name
- Prionocris rhodopepla (Lower, 1903)

Synonyms
- Hoplitica rhodopepla Lower, 1903

Species of moth

Prionocris rhodopepla is a moth in the family Oecophoridae. It was described by Oswald Bertram Lower in 1903. It is found in Australia, where it has been recorded from Queensland.

The wingspan is about 25 mm. The forewings are light fleshy red with a small fuscous dot in the disc at one-third, a second below and beyond and a third in the disc at two-thirds. The costal edge is deeper than the ground colour and the extreme costal edge is whitish from one-third to beyond the middle. The hindwings are whitish ochreous with an obscure fuscous suffusion at the apex, continued narrowly to the middle.
