= Garrha leucerythra =

Scientific classification
- Kingdom: Animalia
- Phylum: Arthropoda
- Clade: Pancrustacea
- Class: Insecta
- Order: Lepidoptera
- Family: Oecophoridae
- Genus: Garrha
- Species: G. leucerythra

Binomial name
- Garrha leucerythra (Meyrick, 1883)

Synonyms
- Hoplitica leucerythra Meyrick, 1883

Species of moth

Garrha leucerythra is a moth in the family Oecophoridae. It was described by Edward Meyrick in 1883. It is found in Australia, where it has been recorded from New South Wales and Tasmania.

The wingspan is 18.5–21 mm. The forewings are pale pinkish ochreous, sometimes rather strongly pinkish and the costa narrowly carmine pink with the tips of the scales whitish. There is a dark fuscous dot in the disc before the middle, a second, slightly larger, in the disc beyond the middle, and a third obliquely beyond the first on the fold. Sometimes, there is a short obsolete oblique row of three grey dots from costa at two-fifths, and occasionally two or three other scattered dark scales towards the base. There is an ill-defined, often almost obsolete, transverse row of irregular dark fuscous dots, from the middle of the costa very obliquely outwards to the disc at five-sixths, then sharply bent and nearly parallel to the hindmargin, ending on the inner margin before the anal angle. The hindwings are whitish, posteriorly faintly tinged with ochreous grey.
