= Garrha rubella =

Scientific classification
- Kingdom: Animalia
- Phylum: Arthropoda
- Clade: Pancrustacea
- Class: Insecta
- Order: Lepidoptera
- Family: Oecophoridae
- Genus: Garrha
- Species: G. rubella

Binomial name
- Garrha rubella (Turner, 1938)

Synonyms
- Machimia rubella Turner, 1938

Species of moth

Garrha rubella is a moth in the family Oecophoridae. It was described by Alfred Jefferis Turner in 1938. It is found in Australia, where it has been recorded from Tasmania.
