= Garrha defessa =

Scientific classification
- Kingdom: Animalia
- Phylum: Arthropoda
- Clade: Pancrustacea
- Class: Insecta
- Order: Lepidoptera
- Family: Oecophoridae
- Genus: Garrha
- Species: G. defessa

Binomial name
- Garrha defessa (Meyrick, 1920)

Synonyms
- Machimia defessa Meyrick, 1920

Species of moth

Garrha defessa is a moth in the family Oecophoridae. It was described by Edward Meyrick in 1920. It is found in Australia, where it has been recorded from Queensland.

The wingspan is about 22 mm. The forewings are pale ochreous, pinkish tinged. The stigmata is rather dark fuscous, the plical spot somewhat beyond the first discal and there is an angulated subterminal series of small groups of two or three rather dark fuscous scales from beneath the costa at two-thirds, rather near the costa and termen to above the tornus. The hindwings are whitish ochreous grey, faintly pinkish tinged.
