= Ironopolia neochlora =

Scientific classification
- Kingdom: Animalia
- Phylum: Arthropoda
- Class: Insecta
- Order: Lepidoptera
- Family: Oecophoridae
- Genus: Ironopolia
- Species: I. neochlora

Binomial name
- Ironopolia neochlora (Meyrick, 1883)

Synonyms
- Hoplitica neochlora Meyrick, 1883

Species of moth

Ironopolia neochlora is a moth in the family Oecophoridae. It was described by Edward Meyrick in 1883. It is found in Australia, where it has been recorded from Queensland.

The wingspan is about 13.5 mm. The forewings are whitish ochreous with a black dot at the base of the costa and a conspicuous black dot in the disc before the middle, a second in the disc beyond the middle, a third on the fold beyond the first and a fourth below and rather beyond the second. There is a row of black dots on the hindmargin. The hindwings are grey.
