= Inga erythema =

Scientific classification
- Kingdom: Animalia
- Phylum: Arthropoda
- Class: Insecta
- Order: Lepidoptera
- Superfamily: Gelechioidea
- Family: Oecophoridae
- Subfamily: Oecophorinae
- Genus: Inga
- Species: I. erythema

Binomial name
- Inga erythema (Walsingham, 1912)

Synonyms
- Cryptolechia erythema Walsingham, 1912; Cryptolechia marcella Busck, 1914; Machimia erythema Walsingham, 1912

Species of moth

Inga erythema is a moth in the family Oecophoridae. It was described by Thomas de Grey in 1912. It is found in Guyana, Brazil and Central America.

The wingspan is 20–22 mm. The forewings are rosy, with an ochreous tinge towards the base, the colour becoming more strongly pink, narrowly along the costa and more widely around the termen. The extreme edge of the costa is ochreous, with a black spot at the base and a smoky black spot lies in the middle of the fold, another on the cell above and before it, and at the end of the cell is a stronger black spot surrounded by a smoky fuscous suffusion extending downward, and obliquely upward toward the apex. There is a line of smoky blackish scales, tending obliquely outward from the costa, forming an angle on vein seven, reverting parallel with the termen to the dorsum before the tornus. The hindwings are yellowish ochreous, with a strong rosy tint about the apex.
