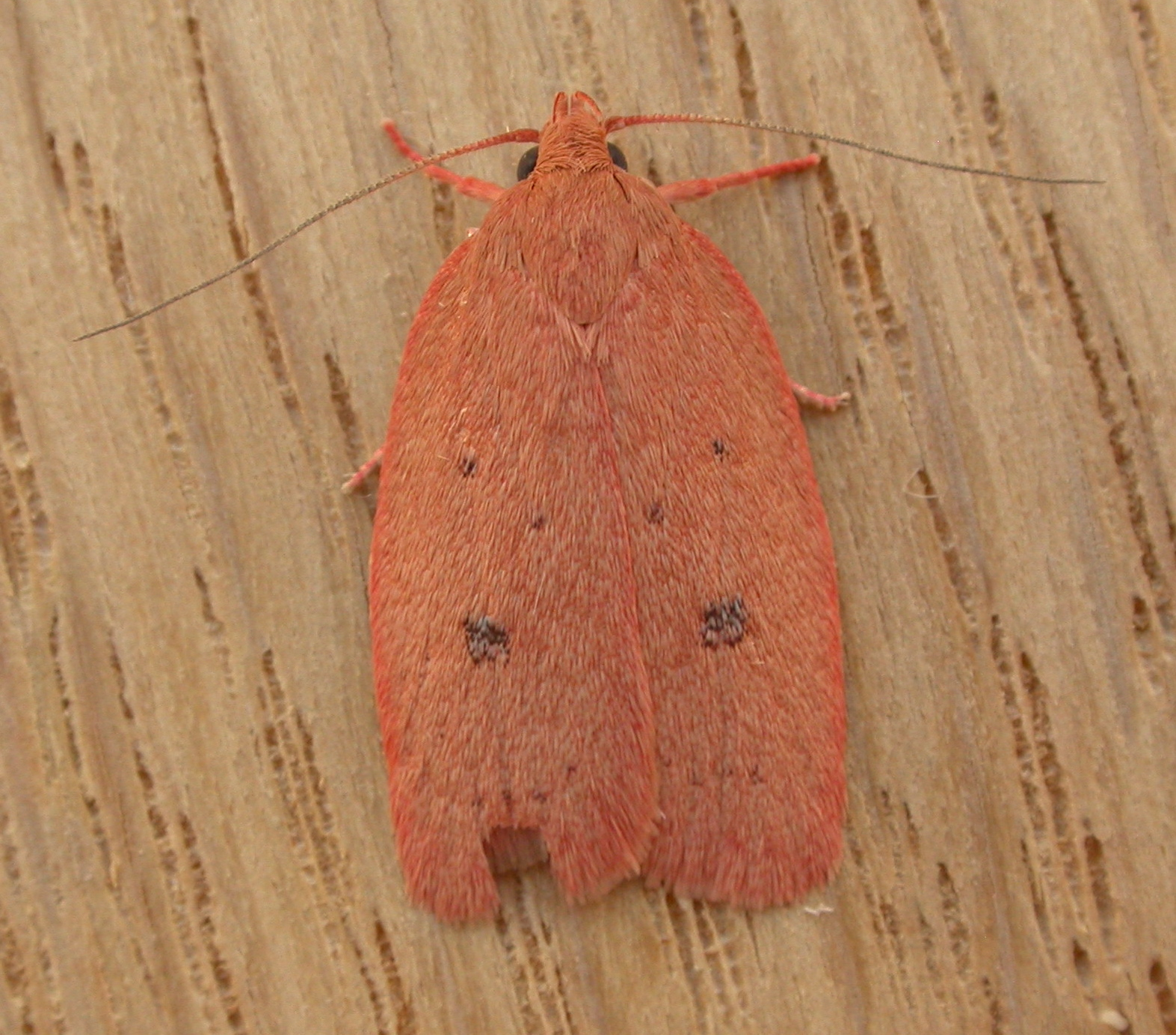

Scientific classification
- Kingdom: Animalia
- Phylum: Arthropoda
- Clade: Pancrustacea
- Class: Insecta
- Order: Lepidoptera
- Family: Oecophoridae
- Genus: Garrha
- Species: G. pudica

Binomial name
- Garrha pudica (Zeller, 1855)

Synonyms
- Cryptolechia pudica Zeller, 1855

= Garrha pudica =

Species of moth

Garrha pudica is a moth of the family Oecophoridae. It is found in Australia, where it has been described from the Australian Capital Territory, New South Wales and Queensland.
