= Garrha metriopis =

Scientific classification
- Kingdom: Animalia
- Phylum: Arthropoda
- Clade: Pancrustacea
- Class: Insecta
- Order: Lepidoptera
- Family: Oecophoridae
- Genus: Garrha
- Species: G. metriopis

Binomial name
- Garrha metriopis (Meyrick, 1887)

Synonyms
- Hoplitica metriopis Meyrick, 1887

Species of moth

Garrha metriopis is a moth in the family Oecophoridae. It was described by Edward Meyrick in 1887. It is found in Australia, where it has been recorded from New South Wales.

The wingspan is 17–19 mm. The forewings are whitish rosy, somewhat mixed irregularly with pale grey and with a grey dot in the disc before the middle, a second on the fold rather obliquely beyond the first and a third rather larger dot in the disc at two-thirds. There is a series of very obscure grey dots from the middle of the costa very obliquely outwards, abruptly curved around in the disc at five-sixths to before the anal angle. The hindwings are very pale whitish grey.
