= Garrha costimacula =

Scientific classification
- Kingdom: Animalia
- Phylum: Arthropoda
- Clade: Pancrustacea
- Class: Insecta
- Order: Lepidoptera
- Family: Oecophoridae
- Genus: Garrha
- Species: G. costimacula

Binomial name
- Garrha costimacula Meyrick, 1883

Synonyms
- Hoplitica costimacula Meyrick, 1883

Species of moth

Garrha costimacula is a moth in the family Oecophoridae. It was described by Edward Meyrick in 1883. It is found in Australia, where it has been recorded from Queensland and New South Wales.

The wingspan is 18–21 mm. The forewings are ochreous carmine pink, strewn with whitish-ochreous scales. The costa is narrowly deeper pink and the tips of the scales are whitish ochreous. There is a dark fuscous dot in the disc before the middle, a second, rather larger and sometimes distinctly double in the disc beyond the middle and a third obliquely beyond the first on the fold. There is a very irregular cloudy grey transverse line close to the base, which is darker on the costa and there is a distinct cloudy strongly and irregularly dentate transverse grey line from the costa to the inner margin, and another more strongly dentate from the costa to the middle of the inner margin, both forming small dark grey spots on the costa. There is also a slenderer and more distinct dark grey sinuate or dentate line from the costa obliquely outwards, thence curved strongly round to the inner margin before the anal angle, thickened and darker near the costa, as well as a cloudy grey shade from the costa to the inner margin before the anal angle, considerably broader towards the costa. A small cloudy grey spot is found towards the middle of the hindmargin and a row of distinct dark grey dots is placed along the hindmargin and apical fourth of the costa. The hindwings are ochreous grey, the costa and base more whitish ochreous.
