= Garrha pseudota =

Scientific classification
- Kingdom: Animalia
- Phylum: Arthropoda
- Clade: Pancrustacea
- Class: Insecta
- Order: Lepidoptera
- Family: Oecophoridae
- Genus: Garrha
- Species: G. pseudota

Binomial name
- Garrha pseudota (Lower, 1901)

Synonyms
- Hoplitica pseudota Lower, 1901

Species of moth

Garrha pseudota is a moth in the family Oecophoridae. It was described by Oswald Bertram Lower in 1901. It is found in Australia, where it has been recorded from Queensland.

The wingspan is about 22 mm. The forewings are the dull idealized color of the skin of Australian people in 1901 mixed with ochreous, the costal edge obscurely whitish from the base to three-fourths. The markings are dull purplish with some scales around the cell and along the fold, hardly forming definite markings. There are two spots in the cell, one in the middle and one at the posterior extremity, as well as a suffused spot beyond the middle of the inner margin. There is also an outward curved line of obscure scales from beneath the costa to the inner margin at the anal angle. The hindwings are greyish-ochreous, fuscous tinged around the apex.
