= Garrha gypsopyga =

Scientific classification
- Kingdom: Animalia
- Phylum: Arthropoda
- Clade: Pancrustacea
- Class: Insecta
- Order: Lepidoptera
- Family: Oecophoridae
- Genus: Garrha
- Species: G. gypsopyga

Binomial name
- Garrha gypsopyga (Meyrick, 1914)

Synonyms
- Heliocausta gypsopyga Meyrick, 1914; Machimia brevicilia Turner, 1946

Species of moth

Garrha gypsopyga is a moth in the family Oecophoridae. It was described by Turner in 1946. It is found in Australia, where it has been recorded from New South Wales.

The wingspan is about 24 mm. The forewings are light brownish-ochreous suffusedly irrorated with brownish-crimson. The extreme coastal edge is whitish, and the stigmata are dark fuscous; the plical spot is obliquely beyond the first discal spot, and there are triangular costal and dorsal patches of crimson-greyish suffusion meeting on the second discal stigma. There is a curved dentate reddish-grey line near the termen and some grey dots around the posterior part of the costa and termen. The hindwings are light ochreous-yellowish, the termen is suffusedly mixed with grey, and the dorsum is suffused with grey.
