= Stictochila delosticta =

Scientific classification
- Kingdom: Animalia
- Phylum: Arthropoda
- Class: Insecta
- Order: Lepidoptera
- Family: Oecophoridae
- Genus: Stictochila
- Species: S. delosticta

Binomial name
- Stictochila delosticta Turner, 1946

Synonyms
- Machimia delosticta Turner, 1946

Species of moth

Stictochila delosticta is a moth in the family Oecophoridae. It was described by Alfred Jefferis Turner in 1946. It is found in Australia, where it has been recorded from Victoria.

The wingspan is 24–25 mm. The forewings are pale ochreous-grey with sharply distinct dark fuscous dots and scanty irroration. The first discal is found at one-fourth, the plical slightly beyond and there is a second discal at three-fifths, with a dot beneath the second. There are also a few dots towards the base, a very slender fuscous line from the mid-costa to four-fifths, bent beneath the costa and ending on the tornus, slightly rippled or divided into dots, as well as a terminal series of dots continued on the apical fourth of the costa. The hindwings are ochreous-whitish, towards the apex slightly greyish.
