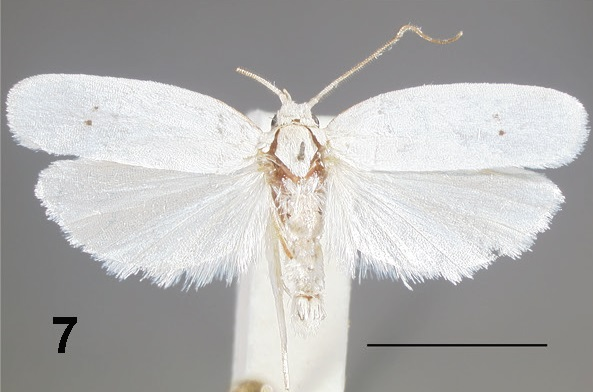
- Male
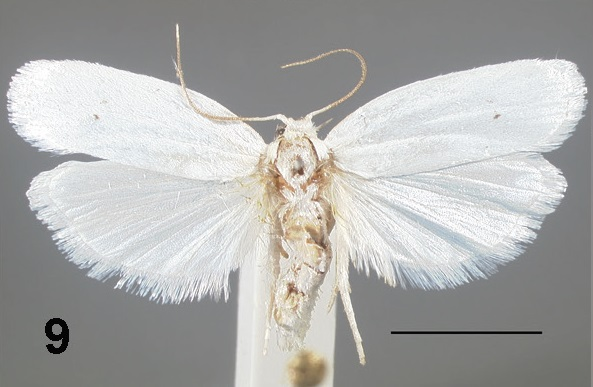
- Female

Scientific classification
- Kingdom: Animalia
- Phylum: Arthropoda
- Clade: Pancrustacea
- Class: Insecta
- Order: Lepidoptera
- Family: Depressariidae
- Genus: Antaeotricha
- Species: A. albulella

Binomial name
- Antaeotricha albulella (Walker, 1864)

Synonyms
- Cryptolechia albulella Walker, 1864; Zauclophora albulella; Cryptolechia vestalis Zeller, 1873; Antaeotricha vestalis; Harpalyce albella Chambers, 1874

= Antaeotricha albulella =

Species of moth in genus Antaeotricha

Antaeotricha albulella, the vestal moth, is a moth in the family Depressariidae. It was described by Francis Walker in 1864. It is found in the United States where it has been recorded from Alabama, Florida, Georgia, Louisiana, Maryland, Mississippi, New Jersey, North Carolina, Oklahoma, South Carolina, Texas and West Virginia.

The wingspan is about 15 mm. Adults are white with a minute, indistinct ochreous spot at the end of the disc. There are also some scattered dark brown scales.
