= Hoplomorpha notatana =

Scientific classification
- Kingdom: Animalia
- Phylum: Arthropoda
- Class: Insecta
- Order: Lepidoptera
- Family: Oecophoridae
- Genus: Hoplomorpha
- Species: H. notatana

Binomial name
- Hoplomorpha notatana (Walker, 1863)

Synonyms
- Conchylis notatana Walker, 1863; Hoplitica porphyraspis Turner, 1896

Species of moth

Hoplomorpha notatana is a moth in the family Oecophoridae. It was described by Francis Walker in 1863. It is found in Australia, where it has been recorded from Queensland.

The wingspan is 19–25 mm. The forewings are whitish grey, irregularly suffused with dark-fuscous scales. The basal one-third of the costa, apex and upper half of the hindmargin are dark fuscous and there is a very large semicircular purplish-fuscous blotch extending on the inner-margin from one-fifth nearly to the anal angle reaching two-thirds across the disc, its anterior margin rounded, its posterior margin straighter, more oblique, and acutely angled just above the anal angle. There are also two small purplish-fuscous dots in the disc posterior to the summit of the dorsal blotch. The posterior portion of the disc is more or less suffused with fuscous, with a paler line first oblique, then parallel to the hindmargin. The hindwings are pale ochreous, the apex suffused with fuscous.
