= Heliocausta floridula =

Scientific classification
- Kingdom: Animalia
- Phylum: Arthropoda
- Class: Insecta
- Order: Lepidoptera
- Family: Oecophoridae
- Genus: Heliocausta
- Species: H. floridula

Binomial name
- Heliocausta floridula Meyrick, 1913

Synonyms
- Machimia metaxantha Turner, 1946

Species of moth

Heliocausta floridula is a moth in the family Oecophoridae. It was described by Edward Meyrick in 1913. It is found in Australia, where it has been recorded from Western Australia, New South Wales and Victoria.

The wingspan is 25–35 mm. The forewings are rosy grey or dull rosy with a narrow bright rosy costal line. The extreme edge is whitish except towards the base. The stigmata is reddish, usually minute or more often absent. The hindwings are pale yellow.
