= Garrha rufa =

Scientific classification
- Kingdom: Animalia
- Phylum: Arthropoda
- Clade: Pancrustacea
- Class: Insecta
- Order: Lepidoptera
- Family: Oecophoridae
- Genus: Garrha
- Species: G. rufa

Binomial name
- Garrha rufa (Meyrick, 1883)

Synonyms
- Hoplitica rufa Meyrick, 1883

Species of moth

Garrha rufa is a moth in the family Oecophoridae. It was described by Edward Meyrick in 1883. It is found in Australia, where it has been recorded from New South Wales.

The wingspan is 15–18 mm. The forewings are deep reddish ochreous or reddish ochreous brown, with scattered lighter ochreous scales. The costa is very narrowly carmine pink and the tips of the scales are ochreous whitish. The discal dots are obsolete, but there are some blackish-grey scales at the base, a small blackish-grey spot on the costa before the middle, tending to form a connected streak with a smaller cloudy blackish-grey spot in the disc at one-fourth from the base, and another on the fold somewhat nearer the base. There is an elongate cloudy blackish-grey blotch along the inner margin from one-third to three-fourths and a blackish-grey cloudy streak from four-fifths of costa to two-thirds of the inner margin, dilated on the costa into a small spot, whence proceeds a transverse slightly curved row of indistinct blackish-grey dots to the inner margin before the anal angle. There is a row of indistinct dark grey dots along the hindmargin and the apical fifth of the costa. The hindwings are ochreous grey, the costa and base more whitish ochreous.
