= Parocystola eubrocha =

Scientific classification
- Kingdom: Animalia
- Phylum: Arthropoda
- Clade: Pancrustacea
- Class: Insecta
- Order: Lepidoptera
- Family: Oecophoridae
- Genus: Parocystola
- Species: P. eubrocha

Binomial name
- Parocystola eubrocha (Turner, 1946)

Synonyms
- Machimia eubrocha Turner, 1946

Species of moth

Parocystola eubrocha is a moth in the family Oecophoridae. It was described by Turner in 1946. It is found in Australia, where it has been recorded from Queensland.
