= Garrha sericata =

Scientific classification
- Kingdom: Animalia
- Phylum: Arthropoda
- Clade: Pancrustacea
- Class: Insecta
- Order: Lepidoptera
- Family: Oecophoridae
- Genus: Garrha
- Species: G. sericata

Binomial name
- Garrha sericata (Meyrick, 1883)

Synonyms
- Hoplitica sericata Meyrick, 1883

Species of moth

Garrha sericata is a moth in the family Oecophoridae. It was described by Edward Meyrick in 1883. It is found in Australia, where it has been recorded from Queensland and New South Wales.

The wingspan is about 16.5 mm. The forewings are uniform whitish-grey, faintly ochreous-tinged and with a whitish costal edge. There is a minute black dot at the base of the costa, a black dot on the inner margin near the base, and sometimes one or two others in the disc towards the base. There is also a black dot in the disc before the middle, a second in the disc beyond middle, a third on the fold obliquely beyond the first, and a fourth, minute or obsolete, below and beyond the second. There is a very fine transverse row of dark grey scales from the middle of the costa to the inner margin before the anal angle, irregularly sinuate on the upper half and strongly angulated in the middle. A row of conspicuous black dots is located on the hindmargin and apical fifth of the costa. The hindwings are grey, but darker towards the apex.
