= Garrha cholodella =

Scientific classification
- Kingdom: Animalia
- Phylum: Arthropoda
- Clade: Pancrustacea
- Class: Insecta
- Order: Lepidoptera
- Family: Oecophoridae
- Genus: Garrha
- Species: G. cholodella

Binomial name
- Garrha cholodella (Meyrick, 1883)

Synonyms
- Hoplitica cholodella Meyrick, 1883

Species of moth

Garrha cholodella is a moth in the family Oecophoridae. It was described by Edward Meyrick in 1883. It is found in Australia, where it has been recorded from New South Wales.

The wingspan is 18–20 mm. The forewings are glossy fuscous, almost wholly overlaid with whitish-ochreous-grey scales and faintly pinkish-tinged. The costal edge is purple fuscous, the tips of the scales whitish and there is a dark fuscous dot in the disc before the middle, a second, larger and indistinctly double in the disc beyond the middle, and a third rather obliquely beyond the first on the fold. The purple-fuscous ground colour forms a small spot on the costa, its apex tending to be connected with the second discal dot, and also giving rise to an obsolete sinuous-dentate transverse line proceeding obliquely outwards, sharply bent in the disc, and continued to the inner margin before the anal angle, most distinct in the disc. There is also a row of purple-fuscous dots along the hindmargin and the apical fourth of the costa. The hindwings are whitish grey, darker posteriorly.
