= Hoplomorpha teratopa =

Scientific classification
- Kingdom: Animalia
- Phylum: Arthropoda
- Class: Insecta
- Order: Lepidoptera
- Family: Oecophoridae
- Genus: Hoplomorpha
- Species: H. teratopa

Binomial name
- Hoplomorpha teratopa (Meyrick, 1920)

Synonyms
- Machimia teratopa Meyrick, 1920

Species of moth

Hoplomorpha teratopa is a moth in the family Oecophoridae. It was described by Edward Meyrick in 1920. It is found in Australia, where it has been recorded from New South Wales.

The wingspan is about 20 mm. The forewings are pale grey irregularly irrorated (sprinkled) with dark grey and with a strong violet gloss, especially anteriorly. There is a very large deep fulvous semiovate dorsal patch sharply limited by a white rim, extending from one-fourth of the dorsum to near the tornus, and reaching two-thirds across the wing, the anterior end vertical and the posterior projecting angularly just over the tornus. There are two or three irregular blackish-grey dots following the posterior edge of this, as well as a blackish somewhat sinuate line from near two-thirds of the costa to near the middle of the termen, a short portion in the middle is deep fulvous. The hindwings are grey whitish with a broad suffused grey terminal fascia.
