= Prodelaca myodes =

Scientific classification
- Kingdom: Animalia
- Phylum: Arthropoda
- Class: Insecta
- Order: Lepidoptera
- Family: Oecophoridae
- Genus: Prodelaca
- Species: P. myodes

Binomial name
- Prodelaca myodes (Meyrick, 1883)

Synonyms
- Hoplitica myodes Meyrick, 1883; Philobota rhodopleura Turner, 1898; Eulechria rhodoloma Lower, 1920

Species of moth

Prodelaca myodes is a moth in the family Oecophoridae. It was described by Edward Meyrick in 1883. It is found in Australia, where it has been recorded from Queensland and New South Wales.

The wingspan is 22-24.5 mm. The forewings are uniform whitish-grey, faintly ochreous-tinged and with the costal edge whitish. There is a minute black dot at the base of the costa, a black dot on the inner margin near the base and sometimes one or two others in the disc towards the base. There is also a black dot in the disc before the middle, a second in the disc beyond the middle, a third on the fold obliquely beyond the first, and a fourth, minute or obsolete, below and beyond the second. A very fine transverse row of dark grey scales, not forming distinct dots, is found from the middle of the costa to the inner margin before the anal angle, irregularly sinuate on the upper half and strongly angulated in the middle. There is also a row of conspicuous black dots on the hindmargin and apical fifth of the costa. The hindwings are grey, darker towards the apex.
