= Garrha carnea =

Scientific classification
- Kingdom: Animalia
- Phylum: Arthropoda
- Clade: Pancrustacea
- Class: Insecta
- Order: Lepidoptera
- Family: Oecophoridae
- Genus: Garrha
- Species: G. carnea

Binomial name
- Garrha carnea (Zeller, 1855)

Synonyms
- Cryptolechia carnea Zeller, 1855; Machimia praepedita Meyrick, 1920

Species of moth

Garrha carnea is a moth in the family Oecophoridae. It was described by Philipp Christoph Zeller in 1855. It is found in Australia, where it has been recorded from Queensland, New South Wales, Victoria, Tasmania and South Australia.

The wingspan is about 22 mm for males and 26 mm for females. The forewings are grey-whitish closely speckled with fuscous and the extreme costal edge is white. The stigmata are cloudy and dark fuscous, the plical spot is somewhat beyond the first discal spot and there are indistinct undefined dentate oblique lines of dark fuscous irroration crossing the wing before and beyond the first discal spot. There is an obtusely angulated series of indistinct dots of dark fuscous irroration crossing the wing beyond the second discal, interrupted in the middle, and another series midway between this and the termen. There is also a terminal series of indistinct similar dots. The hindwings are light grey, paler towards the base.

The larvae feed on the dead leaves of Eucalyptus species. Pupation takes place in the case.
