= Lichenaula provisa =

Scientific classification
- Domain: Eukaryota
- Kingdom: Animalia
- Phylum: Arthropoda
- Class: Insecta
- Order: Lepidoptera
- Family: Xyloryctidae
- Genus: Lichenaula
- Species: L. provisa

Binomial name
- Lichenaula provisa T. P. Lucas, 1900

Species of moth

Lichenaula provisa is a moth in the family Xyloryctidae. It was described by Thomas Pennington Lucas in 1900. It is found in Australia, where it has been recorded from Queensland.

== Description ==
The wingspan is about 18 mm. The forewings are greyish white with fuscous specks, and markings of black and fuscous. There is a white blotch on the base having a black spot on the costa, and a black dash toward the hind inner margin, bordered by a transverse row of black dots. There is a white diffused patch covering two-fifths of the wing with an arched diffusion of the dots and splashes longitudinally through the centre to the inner margin at half. There is a line of six spots from the costa at two-fifths to the apex, becoming diffused into a fascia over the posterior three-fifths of the wing, irregularly marked with fuscous-black spots, and splashed with metallic copper. A white spur runs into this dark fascia halfway across the wing, immediately before the anal angle. There is a subterminal grey white line. The hindwings are ochreous white, with the veins grey, shaded with fuscous along the hindmargin.

== Taxonomy ==
It was treated as a synonym of Lichenaula phloeochroa, but DNA barcoding has shown this species to be distinctly separate.
