= Lichenaula tortriciformis =

Scientific classification
- Domain: Eukaryota
- Kingdom: Animalia
- Phylum: Arthropoda
- Class: Insecta
- Order: Lepidoptera
- Family: Xyloryctidae
- Genus: Lichenaula
- Species: L. tortriciformis

Binomial name
- Lichenaula tortriciformis T. P. Lucas, 1900

Species of moth

Lichenaula tortriciformis is a moth in the family Xyloryctidae. It was described by Thomas Pennington Lucas in 1900. It is found in Australia, where it has been recorded from Queensland.

The wingspan is about 17 mm. The forewings are silvery grey, freely irrorated (sprinkled) with fuscous and marked with red fuscous and black. There is a costal row of blackish-fuscous spots, or breaking into scattered dots from the base to halfway the costa, but not touching the costal edge. There is a transverse ferrous-fuscous fascia from halfway the costa diffused across the wing, and shaded with scattered black dots and fuscous scales. This fascia is diffused broadly and irregularly to the apex, and more or less continuously over the costal half of the hindmargin. There are numerous black dots and short fuscous lines on the veins toward the hindmargin. The hindwings are light fuscous grey.
