= Lichenaula undulatella =

Scientific classification
- Kingdom: Animalia
- Phylum: Arthropoda
- Class: Insecta
- Order: Lepidoptera
- Family: Xyloryctidae
- Genus: Lichenaula
- Species: L. undulatella

Binomial name
- Lichenaula undulatella (Walker, 1864)

Synonyms
- Cryptolechia undulatella Walker, 1864

Species of moth

Lichenaula undulatella is a moth in the family Xyloryctidae. It was described by Francis Walker in 1864. It is found in Australia, where it has been recorded from New South Wales, Queensland and Western Australia.

The wingspan is 18–21 mm. The forewings are red brown, becoming deeper on the lower half and there is a rather broad white streak along the costa from near the base to near the apex, attenuated to both extremities. A broad grey streak, sprinkled with brownish, is found along the inner margin from the base to the anal angle, beyond the middle forming a broad triangular projection upwards, reaching half across the wing, then abruptly attenuated. There is a darker transverse mark in the disc at two-thirds and a slender strongly outwards-curved whitish line from the costal streak at two-thirds to the inner margin before the anal angle, indented above the lower extremity, where it forms a small spot. There is also a grey apical blotch, covering the whole area beyond this line except a spot towards the anal angle and there is a series of small dark fuscous spots along the hindmargin and around the apex. The hindwings are fuscous, lighter and more ochreous-tinged anteriorly, the hindmargin suffusedly darker.

The larvae feed on Acacia decurrens, Acacia melanoxylon, Acacia pendula and Jacksonia scoparia. They bore in a plant gall or are found in a shelter in leaves or phyllodes.
