= Lichenaula drosias =

Scientific classification
- Kingdom: Animalia
- Phylum: Arthropoda
- Clade: Pancrustacea
- Class: Insecta
- Order: Lepidoptera
- Family: Xyloryctidae
- Genus: Lichenaula
- Species: L. drosias

Binomial name
- Lichenaula drosias Lower, 1899

Species of moth

Lichenaula drosias is a moth in the family Xyloryctidae. It was described by Oswald Bertram Lower in 1899. It is found in Australia, where it has been recorded from the Northern Territory, New South Wales and Queensland.

The wingspan is 20–22 mm. The forewings are white, very finely irrorated (sprinkled) with black and grey scales, so as to appear ashy-grey whitish. The extreme costal edge is whitish and there is a small blotch-like suffusion in the disc at two-fifths from the base, more or less connected by a fine black line from the base to the middle. The blotch is immediately followed by a well marked spot of ground colour and there is an obscure row of blackish spots along the apical fifth of the costa. The hindwings are pale greyish fuscous.
