= Lichenaula fumata =

Scientific classification
- Domain: Eukaryota
- Kingdom: Animalia
- Phylum: Arthropoda
- Class: Insecta
- Order: Lepidoptera
- Family: Xyloryctidae
- Genus: Lichenaula
- Species: L. fumata

Binomial name
- Lichenaula fumata Turner, 1898

Species of moth

Lichenaula fumata is a moth in the family Xyloryctidae. It was described by Alfred Jefferis Turner in 1898. It is found in Australia, where it has been recorded from Queensland.

The wingspan is 25–28 mm. The forewings are pale fuscous confusedly irrorated with blackish-fuscous, and sometimes also with white scales. There is a blackish-fuscous crescentic mark in the disc at three-fifths. The hindwings are grey-whitish, fuscous tinged towards the hindmargin.

The larvae possibly feed on Grevillea species.
