= Lichenaula circumsignata =

Scientific classification
- Domain: Eukaryota
- Kingdom: Animalia
- Phylum: Arthropoda
- Class: Insecta
- Order: Lepidoptera
- Family: Xyloryctidae
- Genus: Lichenaula
- Species: L. circumsignata

Binomial name
- Lichenaula circumsignata T. P. Lucas, 1900

Species of moth

Lichenaula circumsignata is a moth in the family Xyloryctidae. It was described by Thomas Pennington Lucas in 1900. It is found in Australia, where it has been recorded from Queensland.

The wingspan is 22–24 mm. The forewings are white, freely dusted with iron grey, and black linear markings, and diffused slaty-grey patches. There are two black dots separate or indistinctly united at the base of the costa and the base of the wing, opposite the centre. There is a straight line from before one-eighth of the costa, to within one-third of the hindmargin, where it becomes a slaty diffusion. A third concave line is found in the disc, extending over the middle third of the wing and there is a short bracket line at two-thirds spanning one-third of the wing, but rather nearer the costa than the inner margin. There are four slaty-grey lines from the costa, the first beyond half reaching one-third across the wing, the remaining three nearer the costa short. A wavy slaty-grey line or effusion is found beyond the second costal line to the inner margin at three-fourths. There is also a subterminal diffused band of the same colour, and a row of terminal spots forming a more or less interrupted line. The hindwings are fuscous drab, with the veins darker.
