= Lichenaula petulans =

Scientific classification
- Domain: Eukaryota
- Kingdom: Animalia
- Phylum: Arthropoda
- Class: Insecta
- Order: Lepidoptera
- Family: Xyloryctidae
- Genus: Lichenaula
- Species: L. petulans

Binomial name
- Lichenaula petulans T. P. Lucas, 1900

Species of moth

Lichenaula petulans is a moth in the family Xyloryctidae. It was described by Thomas Pennington Lucas in 1900. It is found in Australia, where it has been recorded from Queensland.

The wingspan is 13–18 mm. The forewings are slaty grey with silver specks and black dots. The subhindmarginal and hindmarginal black lines are faintly defined. The hindwings are silvery grey, darker diffused toward the hindmargin.
