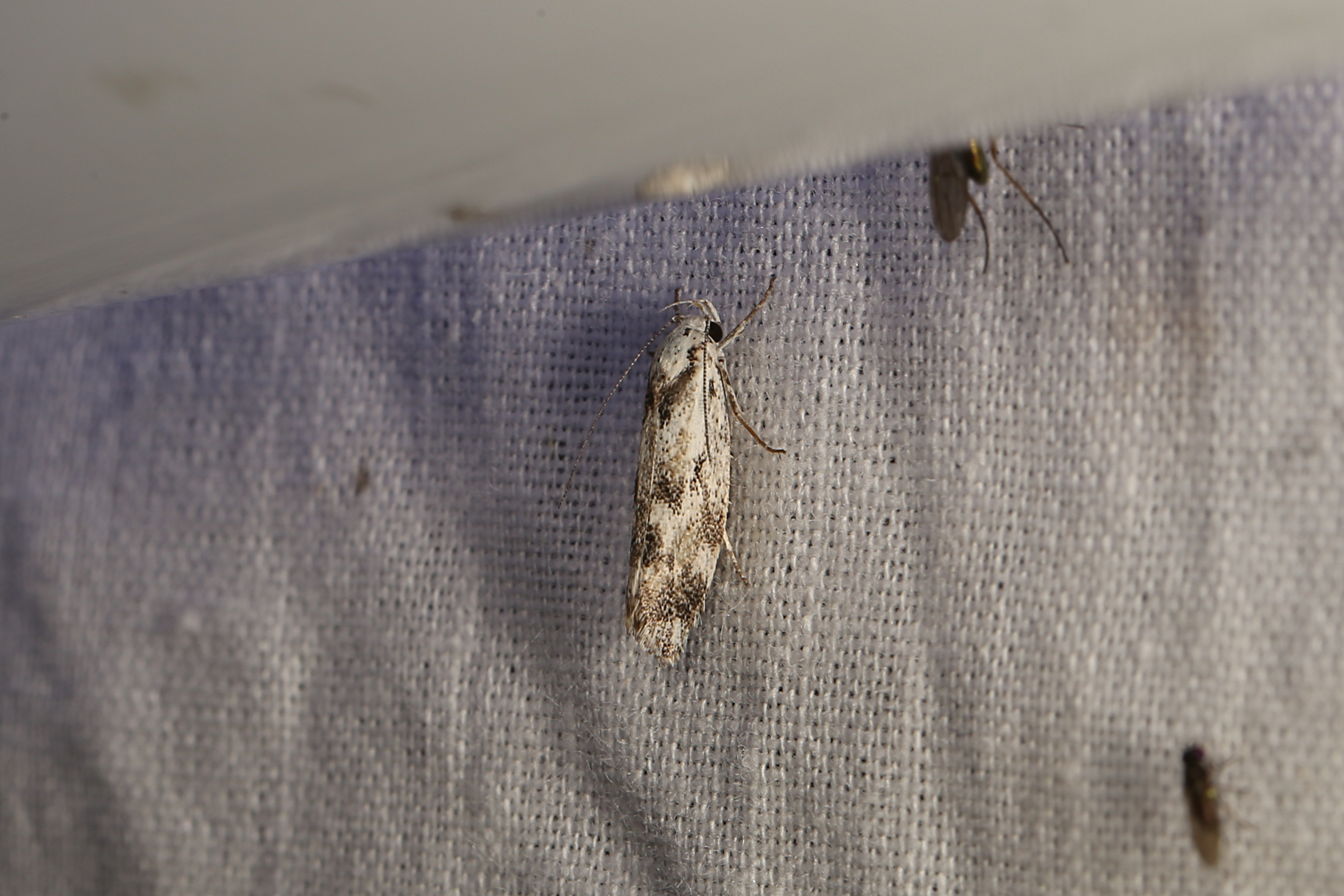

Scientific classification
- Domain: Eukaryota
- Kingdom: Animalia
- Phylum: Arthropoda
- Class: Insecta
- Order: Lepidoptera
- Family: Xyloryctidae
- Genus: Lichenaula
- Species: L. onychotypa

Binomial name
- Lichenaula onychotypa Turner, 1939

= Lichenaula onychotypa =

Species of moth

Lichenaula onychotypa is a moth in the family Xyloryctidae. It was described by Alfred Jefferis Turner in 1939. It is found in Australia, where it has been recorded from the Australian Capital Territory, New South Wales, South Australia, Tasmania, Victoria and Western Australia.

The wingspan is about 20 mm. The forewings are white heavily sprinkled with fuscous and with fuscous markings. There is an oblique, slightly curved line from beneath the costa near the base to near the base of the dorsum. There is a small dorsal suffusion, from the middle of which a stout inwardly oblique line runs halfway across the disc. An ill-defined fascia is found from the midcosta to the tornus and there is an erect line from the tornus joining an elongate subapical costal spot, the posterior edge of which is again connected with the tornus. There is also a broad submarginal line from the apex not reaching the tornus. The hindwings are whitish with the extreme apex slightly suffused with grey.
