= Lichenaula ignota =

Scientific classification
- Domain: Eukaryota
- Kingdom: Animalia
- Phylum: Arthropoda
- Class: Insecta
- Order: Lepidoptera
- Family: Xyloryctidae
- Genus: Lichenaula
- Species: L. ignota

Binomial name
- Lichenaula ignota Turner, 1898

Species of moth

Lichenaula ignota is a moth in the family Xyloryctidae. It was described by Alfred Jefferis Turner in 1898. It is found in Australia, where it has been recorded from the Australian Capital Territory, New South Wales, Queensland and Victoria.

The wingspan is 15–18 mm. The forewings are whitish-grey irrorated with black scales and there is a black dot in the disc at two-thirds. There is an obscure, outwardly oblique, short, black marking from the middle of the inner-margin and beyond this is a small whitish-grey patch. A blackish suffusion is found at the anal angle. The hindwings are pale-grey.
