= Lichenaula mochlias =

Scientific classification
- Kingdom: Animalia
- Phylum: Arthropoda
- Clade: Pancrustacea
- Class: Insecta
- Order: Lepidoptera
- Family: Xyloryctidae
- Genus: Lichenaula
- Species: L. mochlias

Binomial name
- Lichenaula mochlias Meyrick, 1890

Species of moth

Lichenaula mochlias is a moth in the family Xyloryctidae. It was described by Edward Meyrick in 1890. It is found in Australia, where it has been recorded from Victoria.

The wingspan is about 26 mm. The forewings are light grey, closely irrorated (sprinkled) with dark fuscous and with a slender transverse blackish streak near the base, not reaching either margin. There are two obscure dark fuscous dots transversely placed in the disc at one-third and there is a short blackish transverse mark in the disc at two-thirds. Indistinct traces of an angulated darker transverse line are found beyond this and there are four small dark fuscous spots on the posterior half of the costa. The hindwings are fuscous grey, lighter towards the base, the apex darker.
