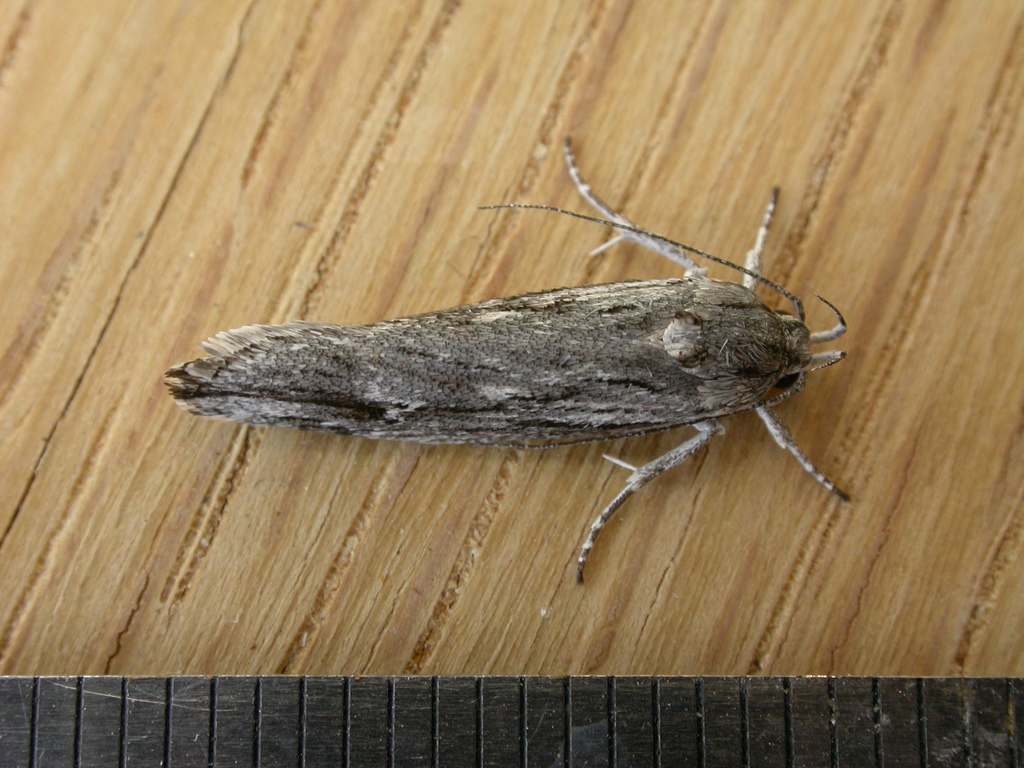

Scientific classification
- Kingdom: Animalia
- Phylum: Arthropoda
- Class: Insecta
- Order: Lepidoptera
- Family: Xyloryctidae
- Genus: Lichenaula
- Species: L. tuberculata

Binomial name
- Lichenaula tuberculata Meyrick, 1890

= Lichenaula tuberculata =

Species of moth

Lichenaula tuberculata is a moth of the family Xyloryctidae. It is endemic to Australia, more specifically the Australian Capital Territory and New South Wales.

The wingspan is 19–27 mm. The forewings are ashy-grey, with scattered whitish scales and the veins partially marked with slender blackish lines, most distinctly in the disc and towards the hindmargin, elsewhere hardly perceptibly. The white scales tend to form streaks in the disc along these lines, and sometimes one or two small indistinct spots before the middle of the disc. There are two black dots transversely placed in the disc at two-thirds, the lower rather anterior, connected by a white posteriorly blackish-margined mark, followed by a cloudy roundish brownish-ochreous suffusion. Some blackish scales form an indistinct subapical suffusion. The hindwings are fuscous, more whitish-fuscous and ochreous-tinged anteriorly, the hindmargin darker.

The larvae feed on Crowea saligna. They bore in the stem of their host plant, tying cut leaves with silk to the bore entrance.
