= Lichenaula tholodes =

Scientific classification
- Domain: Eukaryota
- Kingdom: Animalia
- Phylum: Arthropoda
- Class: Insecta
- Order: Lepidoptera
- Family: Xyloryctidae
- Genus: Lichenaula
- Species: L. tholodes

Binomial name
- Lichenaula tholodes Turner, 1900

Synonyms
- Crypsicharis semnospora Meyrick, 1921

Species of moth

Lichenaula tholodes is a moth in the family Xyloryctidae. It was described by Alfred Jefferis Turner in 1900. It is found in Australia, where it has been recorded from New South Wales and Queensland.

The wingspan is 18–21 mm. The forewings are purplish-fuscous, densely irrorated with whitish, less so along a line from the base to the anal angle. The hindwings are grey.
