= Lichenaula pelodesma =

Scientific classification
- Domain: Eukaryota
- Kingdom: Animalia
- Phylum: Arthropoda
- Class: Insecta
- Order: Lepidoptera
- Family: Xyloryctidae
- Genus: Lichenaula
- Species: L. pelodesma

Binomial name
- Lichenaula pelodesma (Lower, 1899)

Synonyms
- Caesyra pelodesma Lower, 1899

Species of moth

Lichenaula pelodesma is a moth in the family Xyloryctidae. It was described by Oswald Bertram Lower in 1899. It is found in Australia, where it has been recorded from New South Wales.

The wingspan is 15–18 mm. The forewings are pale yellow with the costal edge fuscous at the base and with a nearly straight irregularly edged coppery-fuscous fascia, from five-sixths of the costa to just before the anal angle, narrowest above and slightly constricted beneath the costa. The hindwings are pale ochreous, sometimes slightly infuscated.
