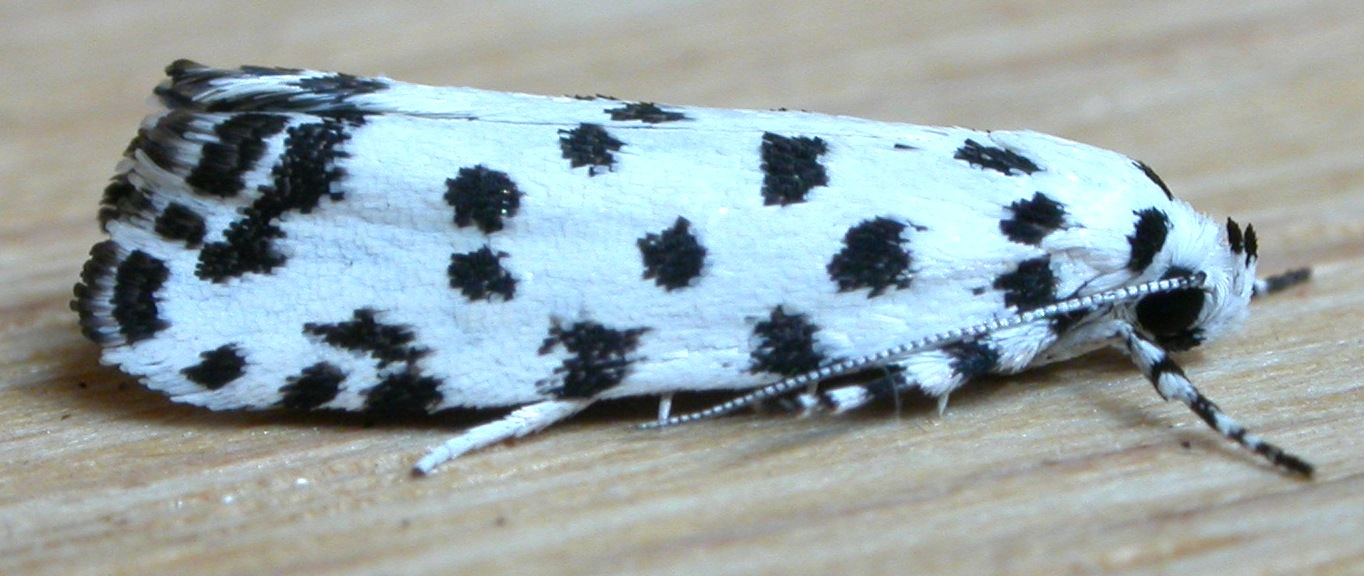

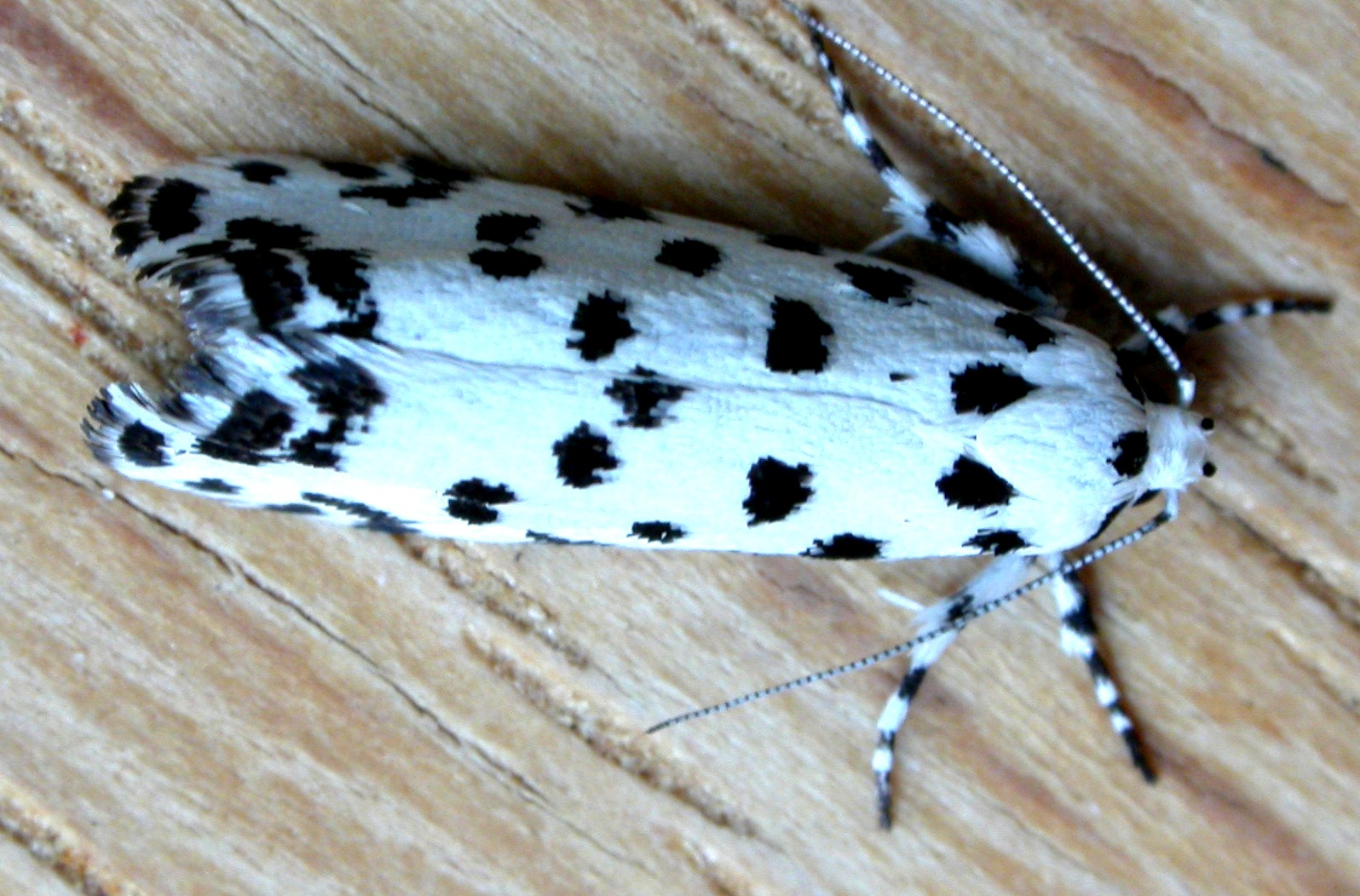

Scientific classification
- Domain: Eukaryota
- Kingdom: Animalia
- Phylum: Arthropoda
- Class: Insecta
- Order: Lepidoptera
- Family: Xyloryctidae
- Genus: Lichenaula
- Species: L. maculosa

Binomial name
- Lichenaula maculosa (Turner, 1898)

Synonyms
- Polynesa maculosa Turner, 1898

= Lichenaula maculosa =

Species of moth

Lichenaula maculosa is a moth of the family Xyloryctidae. It is found in Australia, where it has been recorded from New South Wales, Queensland and Victoria.

The wingspan is about 16 mm. The forewings are white, with many large black dots, three at the base, four on the costa, three in a line above the middle of the disc, one in the disc beneath the last of these, two on the fold, one on the inner-margin at three-fifths, three near and parallel to the hindmargin, the lowest touching it and a few black scales on the hindmargin. The hindwings are whitish.
