= Lichenaula callispora =

Scientific classification
- Domain: Eukaryota
- Kingdom: Animalia
- Phylum: Arthropoda
- Class: Insecta
- Order: Lepidoptera
- Family: Xyloryctidae
- Genus: Lichenaula
- Species: L. callispora

Binomial name
- Lichenaula callispora Turner, 1904

Species of moth

Lichenaula callispora is a moth in the family Xyloryctidae. It was described by Alfred Jefferis Turner in 1904. It is found in Australia, where it has been recorded from New South Wales, Queensland and Victoria.

The wingspan is 12–20 mm. The forewings are white, with blackish spots and a row of two or three spots close to the base and two to four spots on the costa, as well as a variable number of spots in the disc and on the dorsum. These may be partly confluent with each other and with costal spots. There is also a terminal series of spots. The hindwings are whitish grey.
