= Lichenaula goniodes =

Scientific classification
- Domain: Eukaryota
- Kingdom: Animalia
- Phylum: Arthropoda
- Class: Insecta
- Order: Lepidoptera
- Family: Xyloryctidae
- Genus: Lichenaula
- Species: L. goniodes

Binomial name
- Lichenaula goniodes Turner, 1898

Species of moth

Lichenaula goniodes is a moth in the family Xyloryctidae. It was described by Alfred Jefferis Turner in 1898. It is found in Australia, where it has been recorded from Queensland.

The wingspan is about 24 mm. The forewings are white, sparsely irrorated with reddish-fuscous scales and with the basal third of the costa blackish. There is a squarish reddish-fuscous blotch on the inner margin before the middle, reaching above the fold, as well as a conspicuous reddish fuscous line from the costa at three-fourths, sharply angulated in the disc, and continued parallel to the hindmargin to before the anal angle. The hindwings are pale ochreous-whitish.
