= Lichenaula lithina =

Scientific classification
- Kingdom: Animalia
- Phylum: Arthropoda
- Class: Insecta
- Order: Lepidoptera
- Family: Xyloryctidae
- Genus: Lichenaula
- Species: L. lithina

Binomial name
- Lichenaula lithina Meyrick, 1890

Species of moth

Lichenaula lithina is a moth in the family Xyloryctidae. It was described by Edward Meyrick in 1890. It is found in Australia, where it has been recorded from New South Wales.

The wingspan is about 14 mm. The forewings are white, thinly and irregularly irrorated (sprinkled) with black and with a pale fuscous suffusion, forming a very indistinct blotch on the anterior half of the inner margin. There is a spot on the inner margin before the anal angle, a spot on the costa beyond the middle and another at four-fifths, all very faint and obscure. The hindwings are whitish, with a bluish tinge, the veins and hind margin obscurely grey.
