= Lichenaula choriodes =

Scientific classification
- Kingdom: Animalia
- Phylum: Arthropoda
- Class: Insecta
- Order: Lepidoptera
- Family: Xyloryctidae
- Genus: Lichenaula
- Species: L. choriodes

Binomial name
- Lichenaula choriodes Meyrick, 1890

Synonyms
- Lichenaula melanosema Turner, 1898

Species of moth

Lichenaula choriodes is a moth in the family Xyloryctidae. It was described by Edward Meyrick in 1890. It is found in Australia, where it has been recorded from New South Wales and Queensland.

The wingspan is 14–22 mm. The forewings are white, more or less densely irrorated (sprinkled) with fuscous, and generally partially sprinkled with black. The markings are ill defined, formed by a confluence of this irroration and there is a narrow transverse streak near the base, not reaching the costa. A triangular blotch is found on the inner margin before the middle, the apex generally more blackish, reaching more than halfway across the wing, the ground colour above this blotch is generally clear white without irroration. There is a cloudy spot on the costa beyond the middle and another at the anal angle, nearly confluent. Two dark fuscous transversely placed sometimes confluent dots are found in the disc at two-thirds and a more or less indicated pale angulated subterminal line, preceded and followed by darker suffusion. The hindwings are light fuscous, more whitish fuscous towards the base.

The larvae feed on lichen from within a silken gallery in a crevice.
