= Lichenaula comparella =

Scientific classification
- Kingdom: Animalia
- Phylum: Arthropoda
- Class: Insecta
- Order: Lepidoptera
- Family: Xyloryctidae
- Genus: Lichenaula
- Species: L. comparella

Binomial name
- Lichenaula comparella (Walker, 1864)

Synonyms
- Oecophora comparella Walker, 1864; Lichenaula callisema Turner, 1898

Species of moth

Lichenaula comparella is a moth in the family Xyloryctidae. It was described by Francis Walker in 1864. It is found in Australia, where it has been recorded from New South Wales and Queensland.

The wingspan is about 18 mm. The forewings are snow white, with fuscous markings. The costal edge is narrowly fuscous towards the base and there is a strongly marked oblique fascia near the base, as well as a broad fuscous blotch on the middle-half of the inner margin, enclosing a small white spot. This blotch narrows in the disc and gives off one of which reaches the costa at half. The other is prolonged beneath the costa towards the base of the wing; and there is an irregular blotch extending from the costa at five-sixths to the anal angle, giving off a fine line joining the central blotch near the inner margin, and a short line to the costa at two-thirds. There are two or three fuscous dots on the hindmargin. The hindwings are pale grey.
