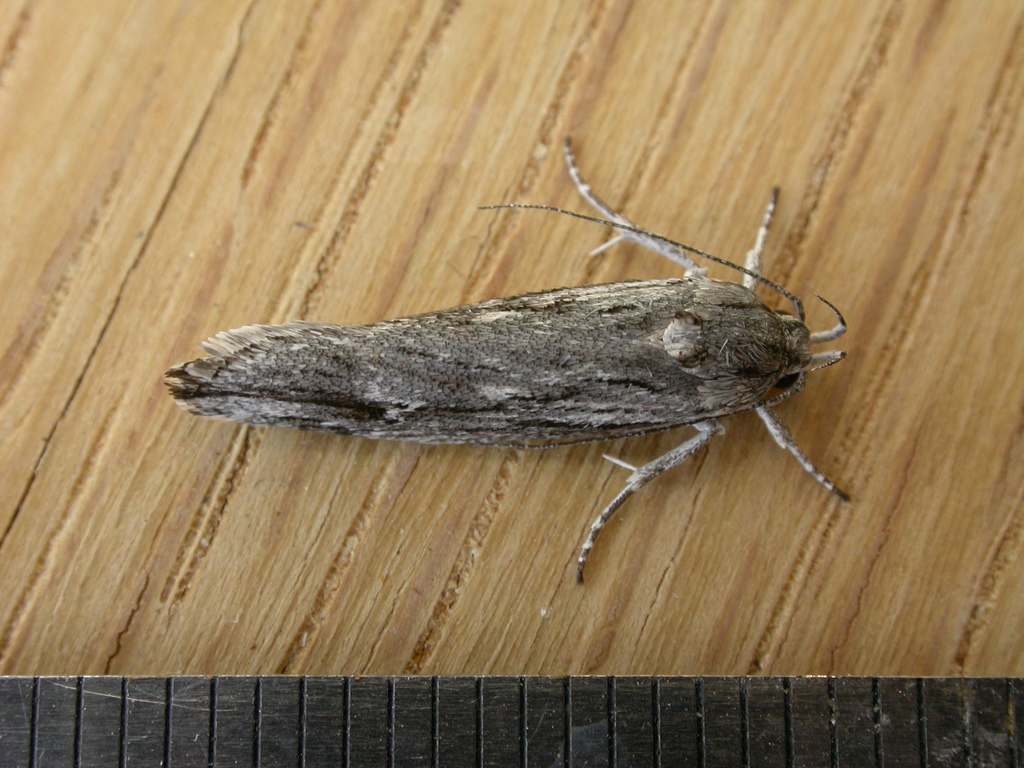
- Lichenaula tuberculata

Scientific classification
- Domain: Eukaryota
- Kingdom: Animalia
- Phylum: Arthropoda
- Class: Insecta
- Order: Lepidoptera
- Family: Xyloryctidae
- Genus: Lichenaula; Meyrick, 1890

Species
- About 30 species; see text for details.

Synonyms
- Polynesa Turner, 1898

= Lichenaula =

Moth genus in family Xyloryctidae

Lichenaula is a genus of Australian moth of the family Xyloryctidae.

The genus was first published by amateur entomologist Edward Meyrick in 1890.

== Species ==
- Lichenaula afflictella (Walker, 1864)
- Lichenaula appropinquans T.P. Lucas, 1901
- Lichenaula arisema Meyrick, 1890
- Lichenaula calligrapha Meyrick, 1890
- Lichenaula callispora Turner, 1904
- Lichenaula choriodes Meyrick, 1890
- Lichenaula circumsignata T.P. Lucas, 1900
- Lichenaula comparella (Walker, 1864)
- Lichenaula drosias Lower, 1899
- Lichenaula fumata Turner, 1898
- Lichenaula goniodes Turner, 1898
- Lichenaula ignota Turner, 1898
- Lichenaula laniata Meyrick, 1890
- Lichenaula lichenea Meyrick, 1890
- Lichenaula lithina Meyrick, 1890
- Lichenaula maculosa (Turner, 1898)
- Lichenaula melanoleuca Turner, 1898
- Lichenaula mochlias Meyrick, 1890
- Lichenaula musica Meyrick, 1890
- Lichenaula neboissi F.G. Neumann, 1970
- Lichenaula onychodes Turner, 1898
- Lichenaula onychotypa Turner, 1939
- Lichenaula pelodesma (Lower, 1899)
- Lichenaula petulans T.P. Lucas, 1900
- Lichenaula phloeochroa Turner, 1898
- Lichenaula provisa Lucas, 1900
- Lichenaula selenophora Lower, 1892
- Lichenaula terminata (Meyrick, 1921)
- Lichenaula tholodes Turner, 1900
- Lichenaula tortriciformis T.P. Lucas, 1900
- Lichenaula tuberculata Meyrick, 1890
- Lichenaula undulatella (Walker, 1864)
