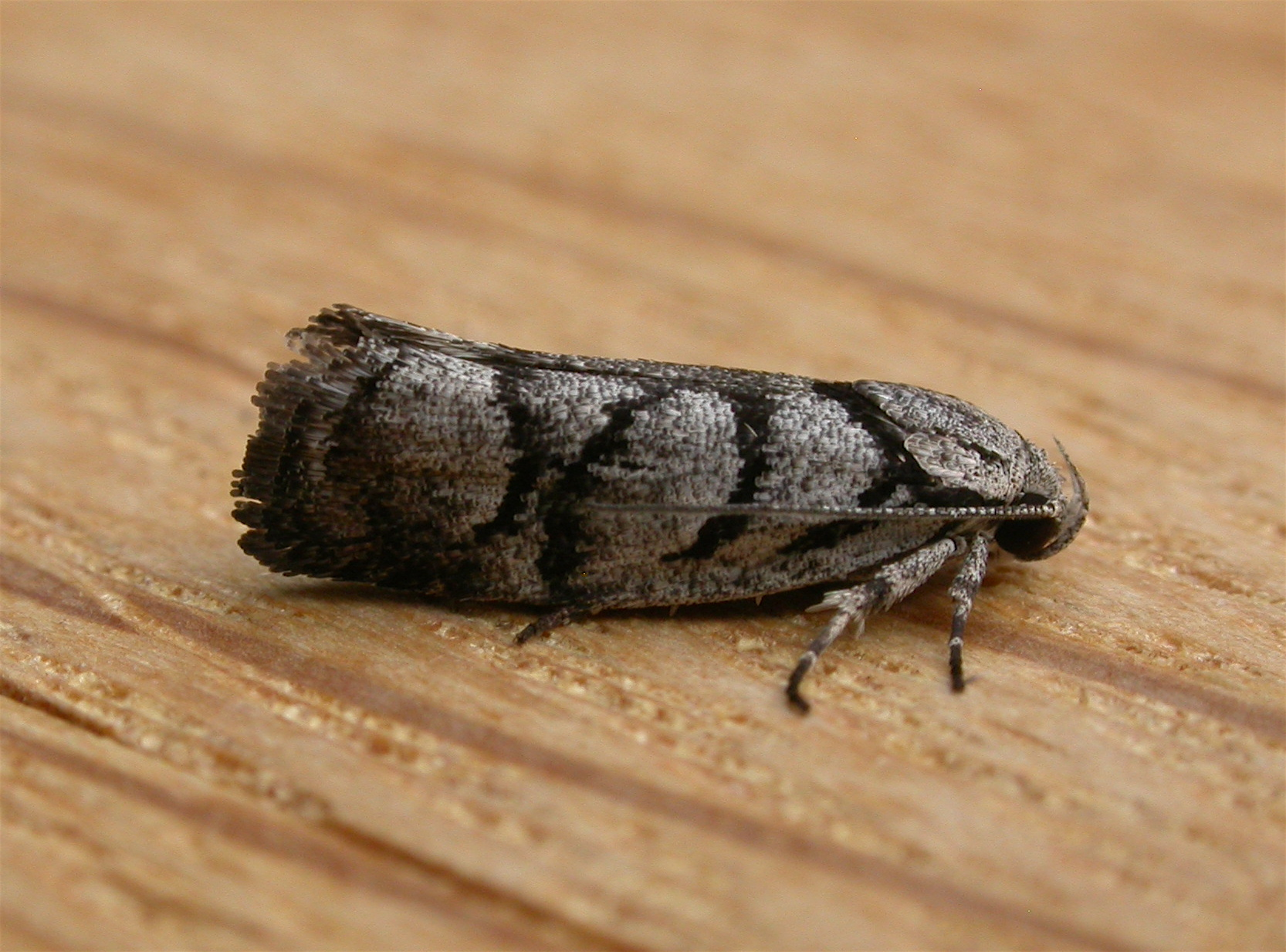

Scientific classification
- Domain: Eukaryota
- Kingdom: Animalia
- Phylum: Arthropoda
- Class: Insecta
- Order: Lepidoptera
- Family: Xyloryctidae
- Genus: Lichenaula
- Species: L. onychodes

Binomial name
- Lichenaula onychodes Turner, 1898

= Lichenaula onychodes =

Species of moth

Lichenaula onychodes is a moth of the family Xyloryctidae. It is found in Australia, where it has been recorded from the Australian Capital Territory, New South Wales, the Northern Territory, Queensland, Tasmania, Victoria and Western Australia.

The wingspan is 16–18 mm. The forewings are grey with blackish markings and with the extreme base of the costa blackish. There is a black line from the base to the inner-margin at one-fifth. From this, another line proceeds obliquely towards but not reaching the costa and there is an inwardly curved transverse line in the disc before one-third, not quite reaching either margin. An inwardly oblique line is found from the costa at three-fifths towards but not reaching the middle of the inner-margin and there is another inwardly curved line from before the anal angle, not reaching the costa. A faint outwardly curved line is found in the disc beyond this. The hindwings are whitish-grey.

The larvae feed on Eucalyptus pauciflora. They bore in stem of their host plant.
