= Lichenaula afflictella =

Scientific classification
- Kingdom: Animalia
- Phylum: Arthropoda
- Class: Insecta
- Order: Lepidoptera
- Family: Xyloryctidae
- Genus: Lichenaula
- Species: L. afflictella

Binomial name
- Lichenaula afflictella (Walker, 1864)

Synonyms
- Cryptolechia afflictella Walker, 1864

Species of moth

Lichenaula afflictella is a moth in the family Xyloryctidae. It was described by Francis Walker in 1864. It is found in Australia, where it has been recorded from Queensland.

The wingspan is about 29.6 mm. Males are white, the forewings rounded at the tips, with black speckles, which are mostly confluent, except towards the base. There are four blackish discal points, two before the middle, the other two beyond the middle. There are also two incomplete diffuse blackish bands and the exterior border is slightly convex and very oblique. The hindwings are cinereous (ash grey). Females are cinereous.
