= Lichenaula musica =

Scientific classification
- Kingdom: Animalia
- Phylum: Arthropoda
- Clade: Pancrustacea
- Class: Insecta
- Order: Lepidoptera
- Family: Xyloryctidae
- Genus: Lichenaula
- Species: L. musica

Binomial name
- Lichenaula musica Meyrick, 1890

Species of moth

Lichenaula musica is a moth in the family Xyloryctidae. It was described by Edward Meyrick in 1890. It is found in Australia, where it has been recorded from South Australia, Victoria and Western Australia.

The wingspan is 17–20 mm. The forewings are greyish ochreous, irrorated (sprinkled) with white and with some scattered black scales, tending to form more or less distinct streaks on the veins, especially near the hindmargin beneath the apex, where in males they form a conspicuous triangular patch. There is a short indistinct outwardly oblique darker streak from the inner margin at one-fourth and there are obscure indications of a cloudy somewhat darker fascia from the middle of the costa to the inner margin before the anal angle. Two black dots are transversely placed in the disc at two-thirds, followed by a small obscure white suffusion. The hindwings are fuscous, paler towards the base.
