= Lichenaula arisema =

Scientific classification
- Domain: Eukaryota
- Kingdom: Animalia
- Phylum: Arthropoda
- Class: Insecta
- Order: Lepidoptera
- Family: Xyloryctidae
- Genus: Lichenaula
- Species: L. arisema

Binomial name
- Lichenaula arisema Meyrick, 1890

Species of moth

Lichenaula arisema is a moth in the family Xyloryctidae. It was described by Edward Meyrick in 1890. It is found in Australia, where it has been recorded from New South Wales, South Australia and Victoria.

The wingspan is 13–16 mm. The forewings are whitish ochreous or white with three moderately broad nearly straight blackish-fuscous fasciae. The first are almost basal and the second are slightly curved, from the middle of the costa to beyond the middle of the inner margin, the posterior edge sometimes with a short central projection. The third is hindmarginal, extending from the apex almost to the anal angle, narrowed to a point beneath, the anterior edge sometimes angulated so as almost to touch the preceding fascia in the middle. The hindwings are dark grey.
