= Lichenaula laniata =

Scientific classification
- Kingdom: Animalia
- Phylum: Arthropoda
- Class: Insecta
- Order: Lepidoptera
- Family: Xyloryctidae
- Genus: Lichenaula
- Species: L. laniata

Binomial name
- Lichenaula laniata Meyrick, 1890

Synonyms
- Lichenaula sternoides H. Lucas, 1901

Species of moth

Lichenaula laniata is a moth in the family Xyloryctidae. It was described by Edward Meyrick in 1890. It is found in Australia, where it has been recorded from New South Wales and Queensland.

The wingspan is 15–18 mm. The forewings are ochreous brown, irrorated (sprinkled) with dark brown and with a very broad white streak, pointed at both ends and along the costa from the base to beyond the middle. The inner margin is slenderly white towards the base, with an irregular white blotch along the inner margin from one-fourth to three-fourths. Its upper anterior angle forming a projection towards the base along the fold, almost confluent with the costal streak, its upper posterior angle forming a projection upwards, reaching halfway across the wing. There is a dark fuscous dot in the disc at two-thirds and a white transverse line, acutely angulated outwards in the middle, from three-fourths of the costa to the inner margin before the anal angle, the angulation confluent with a suffused white spot on the hindmargin, and sometimes also filled up anteriorly with a white suffusion. There is also a white hindmarginal line. The hindwings are whitish grey.
