= Lichenaula neboissi =

Scientific classification
- Domain: Eukaryota
- Kingdom: Animalia
- Phylum: Arthropoda
- Class: Insecta
- Order: Lepidoptera
- Family: Xyloryctidae
- Genus: Lichenaula
- Species: L. neboissi

Binomial name
- Lichenaula neboissi F.G. Neumann, 1970

Species of moth

Lichenaula neboissi is a moth in the family Xyloryctidae. It was described by F.G. Neumann in 1970. It is found in Australia, where it has been recorded from Victoria.

The larvae feed on Pinus radiata.
