= Lichenaula terminata =

Scientific classification
- Domain: Eukaryota
- Kingdom: Animalia
- Phylum: Arthropoda
- Class: Insecta
- Order: Lepidoptera
- Family: Xyloryctidae
- Genus: Lichenaula
- Species: L. terminata

Binomial name
- Lichenaula terminata (Meyrick, 1921)

Synonyms
- Xylorycta terminata Meyrick, 1921

Species of moth

Lichenaula terminata is a moth in the family Xyloryctidae. It was described by Edward Meyrick in 1921. It is found on New Guinea.

The wingspan is about 26 mm. The forewings are shining white with the extreme costal edge light yellow ochreous, at the base greyish, a very fine interrupted orange line from the costa at two-thirds to beneath two small orange spots on the costa near the apex. There is also a short fine black line on the apical edge, forming a small black spot at the upper extremity. There are three black dots on the lower part of the termen, the lowest enlarged into a small spot. The hindwings are white, with the dorsal hairs slightly ochreous tinged and the apical edge is pale greyish.
