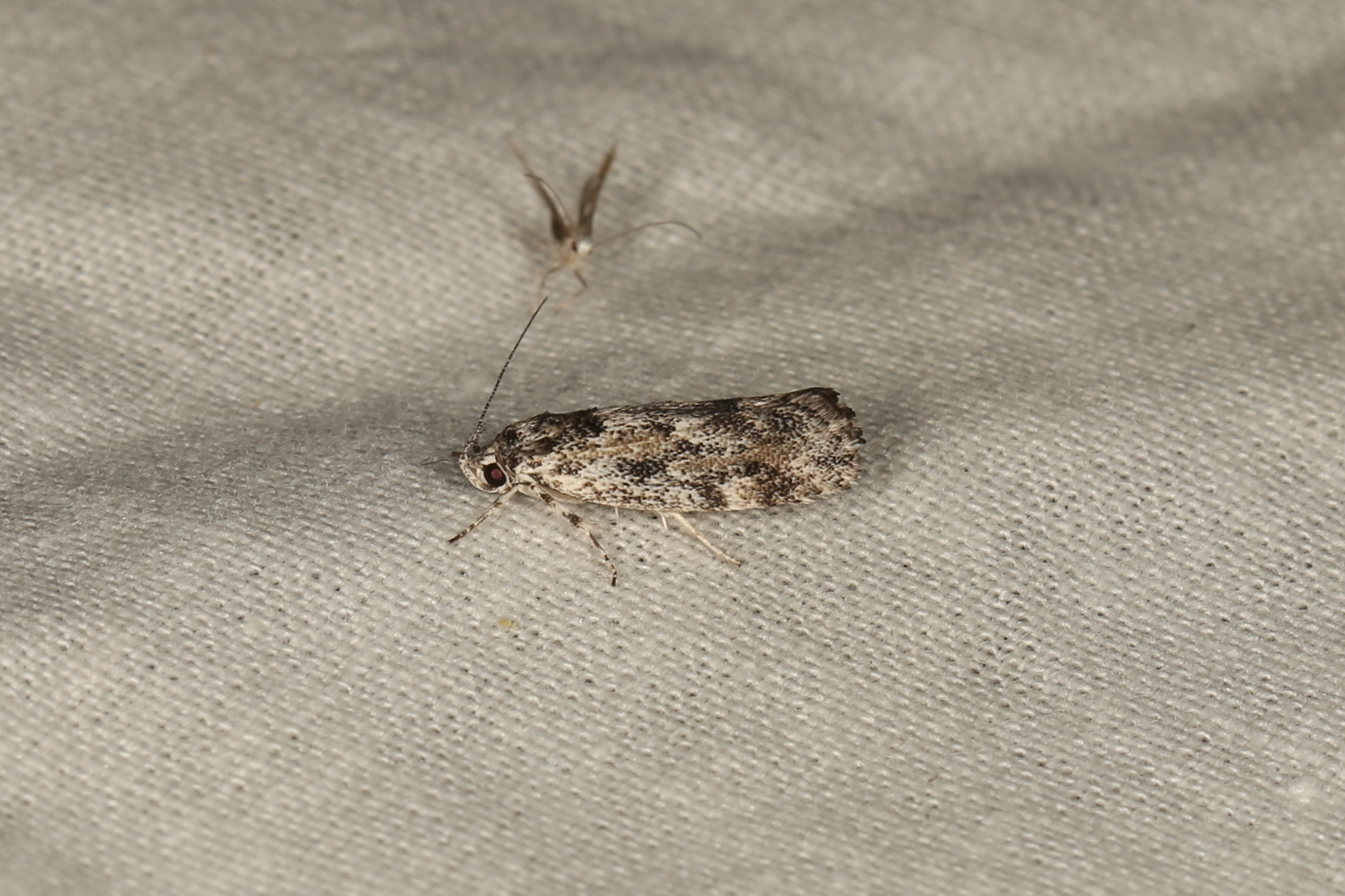

Scientific classification
- Kingdom: Animalia
- Phylum: Arthropoda
- Clade: Pancrustacea
- Class: Insecta
- Order: Lepidoptera
- Family: Xyloryctidae
- Genus: Lichenaula
- Species: L. appropinquans

Binomial name
- Lichenaula appropinquans T. P. Lucas, 1901

= Lichenaula appropinquans =

Species of moth

Lichenaula appropinquans is a moth in the family Xyloryctidae. It was described by Thomas Pennington Lucas in 1901. It is found in Australia, where it has been recorded from New South Wales and Queensland.

The wingspan is 17–23 mm. The forewings are white suffused with grey, and densely irrorated (sprinkled) with blackish-fuscous scales, with blackish-fuscous markings. The costa is narrowly edged with white and a circular dentate black band crosses the wing close to the base, diffused into a broader band along the inner margin, ending in a prominent circular spot at one-fourth of the inner margin. There is a broken band of four diffused spots from halfway the costa to halfway the inner margin, as well as a spot on the costa which is most prominent. A diffused spot is found between the inner marginal spot at one-fourth and the costa and there is also a spot at half. Beyond a row of four spots are two different dots, one over the median vein, and the other close to the inner margin at three-fifths. A costal row of diffused spots subtends a suffusion of grey and fuscous over the centre of the wing, extending to a large pronounced blotch which runs toward the inner margin near the anal angle and a submarginal band does not touch margins. There is also a hindmarginal band of minute diffused dots. The hindwings are smokey grey, lighter towards the base.
