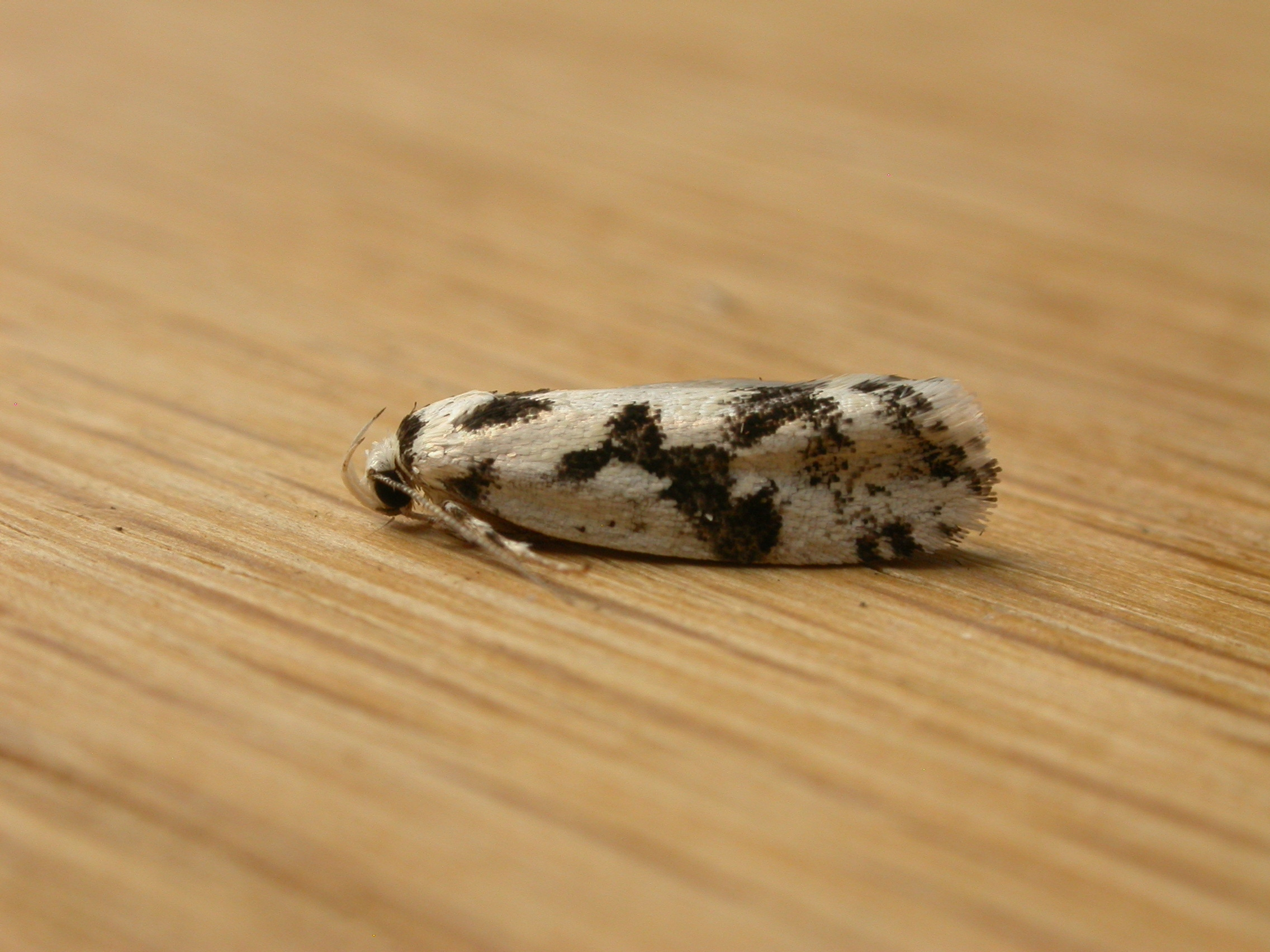

Scientific classification
- Kingdom: Animalia
- Phylum: Arthropoda
- Class: Insecta
- Order: Lepidoptera
- Family: Xyloryctidae
- Genus: Lichenaula
- Species: L. calligrapha

Binomial name
- Lichenaula calligrapha Meyrick, 1890

Synonyms
- Xylorycta calligrapha

= Lichenaula calligrapha =

Species of moth

Lichenaula calligrapha is a species of moth of the family Xyloryctidae. It is known from rainforests from northern Queensland to Victoriaalthough it has also been recorded from the Australian Capital Territory, New South Wales and Tasmania.

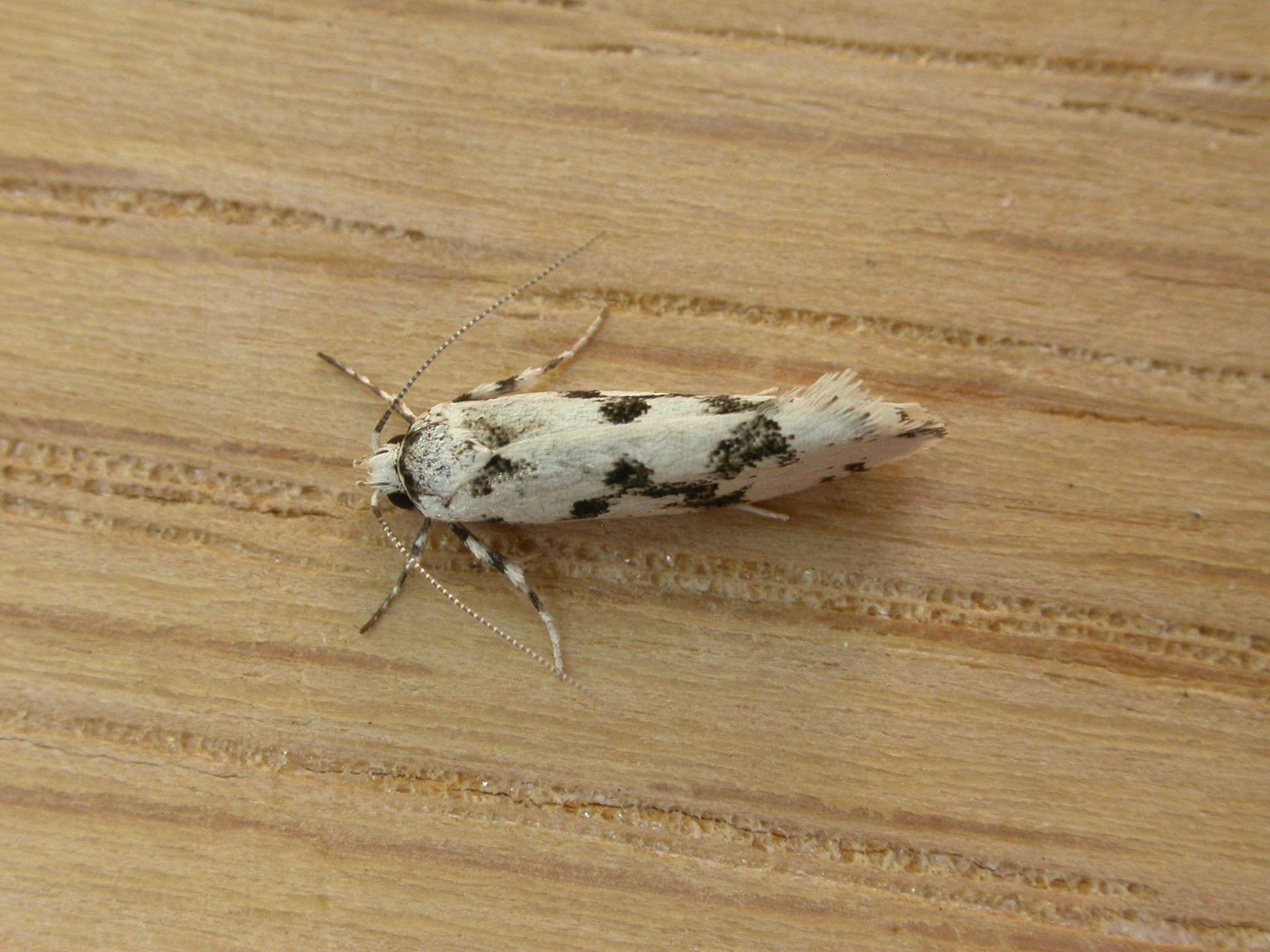

Adults are on wing in November and January.

== Original description ==
Both sexes, 16-17mm. Head white. Palpi white, base of second joint, and base and apex of terminal joint black Antennae white, annulated with blackish, ciliations in male 1. Thorax white, anteriorly margin narrowly black, with a projection backwards on each side of back. Abdomen whitish. Legs white, anterior and middle pair banded with blackish. Forewings elongate, costa gently arched, apex round-pointed, hindmargin nearly straight, oblique; 7 to apex; ochreous-white; markings black; a spot on base of costa, and another on inner margin near base; an irregular-edged streak from costa beyond middle to submedian fold before middle, its lower extremity almost confluent with a small spot in disc at 1/3; an erect mark from inner margin before anal angle, its apex acutely furcate; two small marks on costa towards apex, and some scattered black scales forming an apical suffusion: cilia ochreous-white, more or less distinctly barred with grey, with an interrupted blackish line. Hindwings whitish grey, more whitish anteriorly, apex grey; cilia grey-whitish, with traces of a darker line.

Sydney, New South Wales; Launceston, Tasmania; in November and January, three specimens.

— Edward Meyrick,

== Food plants ==
The larvae probably feed on lichens.
