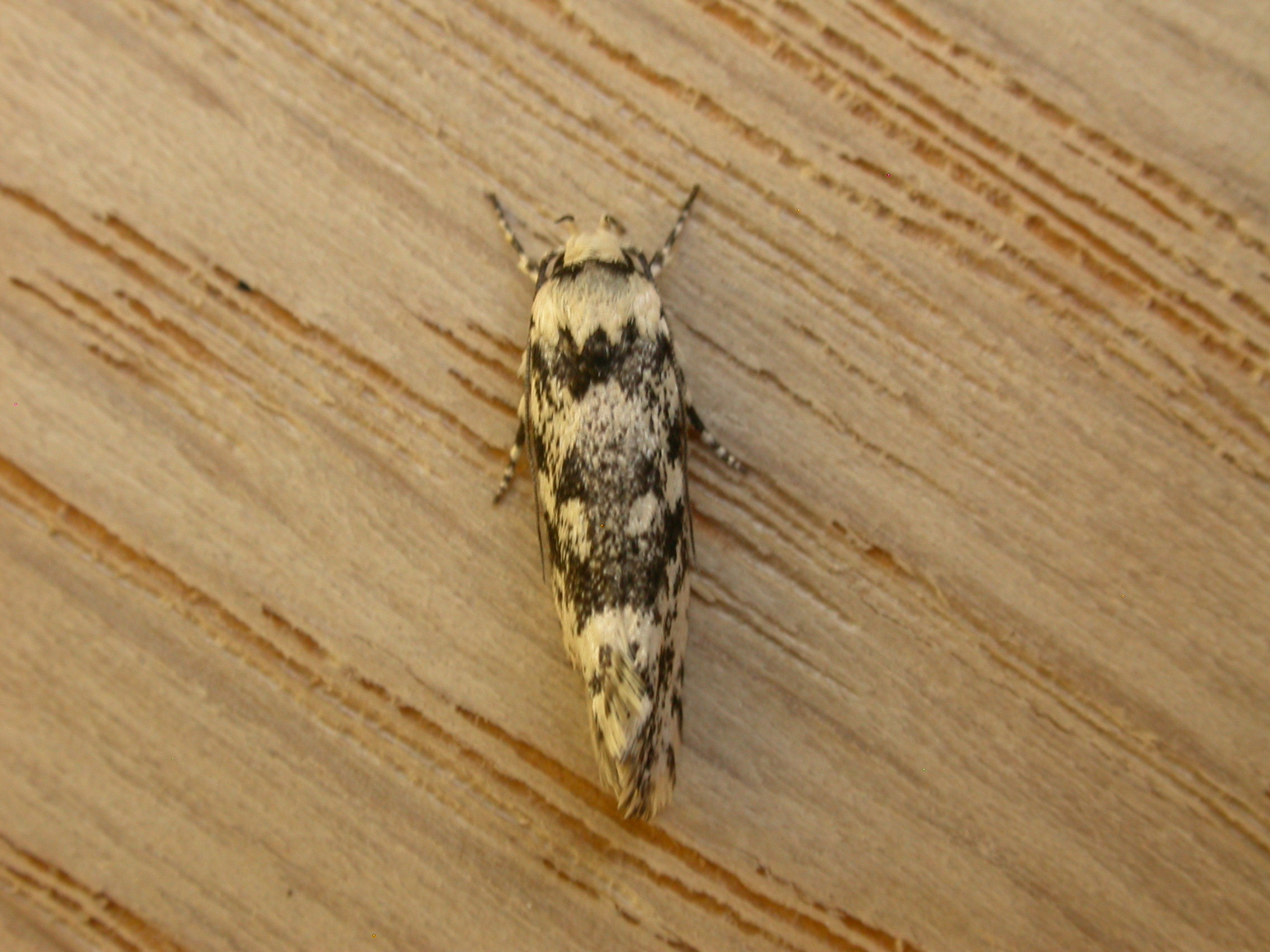

Scientific classification
- Kingdom: Animalia
- Phylum: Arthropoda
- Class: Insecta
- Order: Lepidoptera
- Family: Xyloryctidae
- Genus: Lichenaula
- Species: L. lichenea

Binomial name
- Lichenaula lichenea Meyrick, 1890

Synonyms
- Phthonerodes lichenea; Xylorycta lichenea

= Lichenaula lichenea =

Species of moth

Lichenaula lichenea is a species of moth of the family Xyloryctidae. It is known in Australia from the Australian Capital Territory, New South Wales and Queensland.

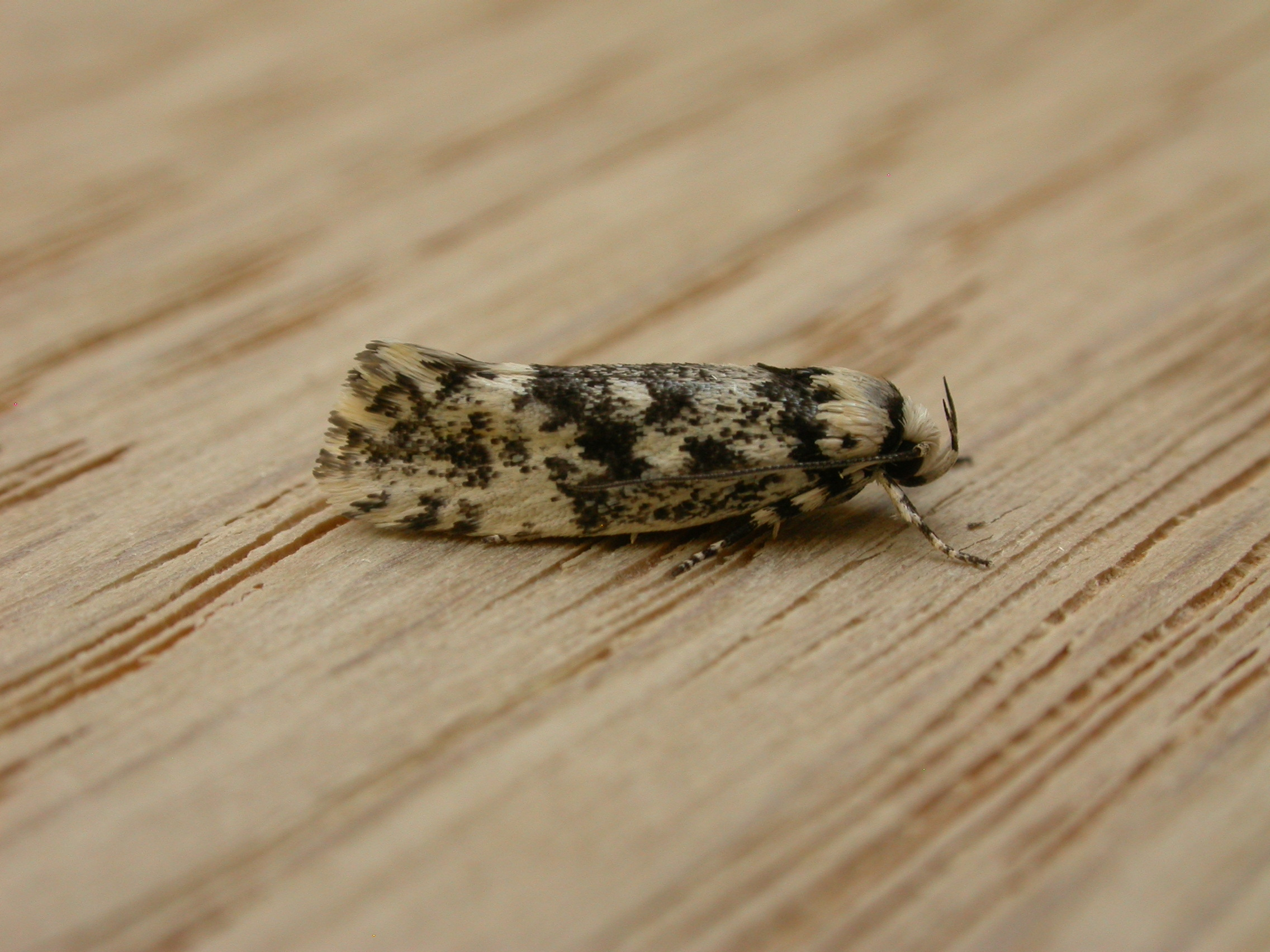

Adults are on wing in March and April.

== Original description ==
Both sexes 15-21 mm. Head white. Palpi white, base of second joint, and base and apex of terminal joint blackish. Antennae white, annulated with blackish, ciliations in male 1. Thorax white, sprinkled with-black, and with a black transverse anterior spot on back. Abdomen grey or grey-whitish. Legs white, anterior and middle pair banded with blackish. Forewings elongate, costa gently arched, apex rounded, hind margin very obliquely rounded; 7 to apex or near below it; ochreous-white, with some scattered black scales; markings brown or grey, densely irrorated with black; a slender irregular oblique fascia near base, generally more or less broadly dilated on lower half; a moderate irregular spot on middle of inner margin; a dot in disc at ½; a small spot in middle of disc, and a furcate mark on inner margin before anal angle, both often much enlarged and suffused so as to become confluent into a cloudy irregular fascia, connecting above with a small spot on costa beyond middle, whence proceeds an irregular somewhat outwards-curved transverse line, sometimes interrupted in disc, to rejoin ante-anal spot of inner margin; often a separate dot within enclosed space; two marks on costa towards apex; a suffused more or less developed subapical spot; a slender streak along hindmargin; all these markings very variable in size and suffusion: cilia ochreous-white, barred with grey, bars densely irrorated with black on basal half. Hindwings varying from rather dark grey to pale whitish-grey; cilia whitish, with a grey line.

Sydney, Bathurst (2,500 feet), and Cooma (3,000 feet), New South Wales; Melbourne, Victoria; common from November to April, at rest on fences and rocks. Larva 16-legged, moderate, cylindrical, with rather long scattered whitish hairs; grey; dorsal, subdorsal, lateral, and spiracular lines dark grey, irregular: spots moderate, black; head blackish; second segment whitish-grey, with a blackish divided plate; anal segment blackish: feeds on lichen-dust on fences and rocks, forming a tunnel in a crevice for shelter, and feeding beneath a gallery of web and refuse, in August and September. The species is a very variable one, and the varieties show some tendency to be localised.

— Edward Meyrick,

== Food plants ==
The larvae feed on lichens growing on fences and rocks, sheltering in a gallery of silk and refuse particles
