= Lichenaula melanoleuca =

Scientific classification
- Kingdom: Animalia
- Phylum: Arthropoda
- Class: Insecta
- Order: Lepidoptera
- Family: Xyloryctidae
- Genus: Lichenaula
- Species: L. melanoleuca

Binomial name
- Lichenaula melanoleuca Turner, 1898

Species of moth

Lichenaula melanoleuca is a moth in the family Xyloryctidae. It was described by Alfred Jefferis Turner in 1898. It is found in Australia, where it has been recorded from New South Wales and Queensland.

The wingspan is about 15 mm. The forewings are blackish-fuscous with white markings. The base is narrowly white and there is an outwardly oblique, irregularly outlined fascia from the costa at one-sixth to the inner-margin at one-fourth, as well as a large white spot on the costa at two-fifths not reaching the fold, another on the costa at two-thirds and a similar spot in the disc at two-thirds confluent with the preceding. A smaller spot is found below the centre of the disc and there is a fifth spot at the anal angle, and two minute dots at and before the apex of the costa. The hindwings are grey.
