= Lichenaula selenophora =

Scientific classification
- Domain: Eukaryota
- Kingdom: Animalia
- Phylum: Arthropoda
- Class: Insecta
- Order: Lepidoptera
- Family: Xyloryctidae
- Genus: Lichenaula
- Species: L. selenophora

Binomial name
- Lichenaula selenophora Lower, 1892

Species of moth

Lichenaula selenophora is a moth in the family Xyloryctidae. It was described by Oswald Bertram Lower in 1892. It is found in Australia, where it has been recorded from New South Wales and Queensland.

The wingspan is 25–28 mm. The forewings are ashy-grey whitish, irrorated (sprinkled) with black, the coalescence of which tends to form obscure markings, leaving the costal edge snow white, from near the base to near the apex. There is an irregular suffusion in the disc and a streak from the base angulated downwards towards the inner margin, but not touching it, at one-fifth then obscurely continued along the fold to beyond the middle. There is a moderate irregular suffused circle, the anterior edge more pronounced immediately above the anal angle, the enclosed space almost white. A whitish apical patch is obscurely continued along the hindmargin to the anal angle and there is a suffused blackish hind marginal line. The hindwings are grey whitish, slightly ochreous tinged, much lighter towards the base.
