= Lichenaula phloeochroa =

Scientific classification
- Domain: Eukaryota
- Kingdom: Animalia
- Phylum: Arthropoda
- Class: Insecta
- Order: Lepidoptera
- Family: Xyloryctidae
- Genus: Lichenaula
- Species: L. phloeochroa

Binomial name
- Lichenaula phloeochroa Turner, 1898

Species of moth

Lichenaula phloeochroa is a moth in the family Xyloryctidae. It was described by Alfred Jefferis Turner in 1898. It is found in Australia, where it has been recorded from New South Wales and Queensland.

The wingspan is 19–24 mm. The forewings are whitish with the veins partly outlined by blackish fuscous scales and the basal part of the disc sparsely irrorated with fuscous. There is a pale reddish-brown suffusion over the middle and posterior portions of the disc above the fold and several inconspicuous black dots on the apical one-third of the costa. The hindwings are pale grey.

The larvae feed on Melaleuca leucadendra. They bore in stem of their host plant.
