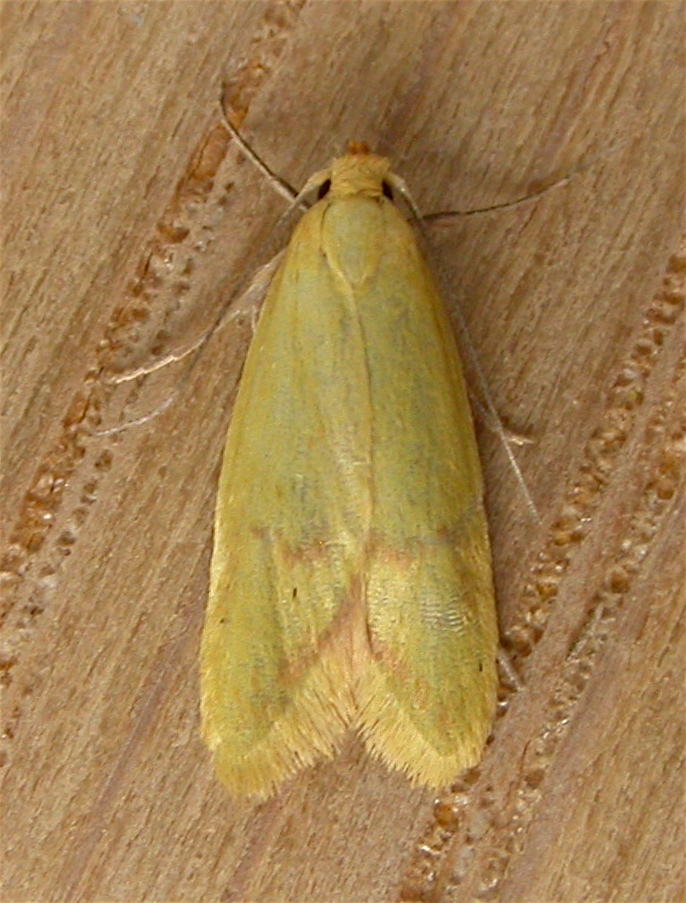

Scientific classification
- Kingdom: Animalia
- Phylum: Arthropoda
- Class: Insecta
- Order: Lepidoptera
- Family: Oecophoridae
- Genus: Aeolothapsa
- Species: A. malacella

Binomial name
- Aeolothapsa malacella Meyrick, 1885

Synonyms
- Ocystola malacella

= Aeolothapsa malacella =

Species of moth

Aeolothapsa malacella is a moth of the family Oecophoridae. It is found in Australia, more specifically Tasmania, New South Wales and Victoria. The average wingspan of the species is around 1 cm (0.39 in).

The larvae feed on the dead leaves of eucalyptus species.
