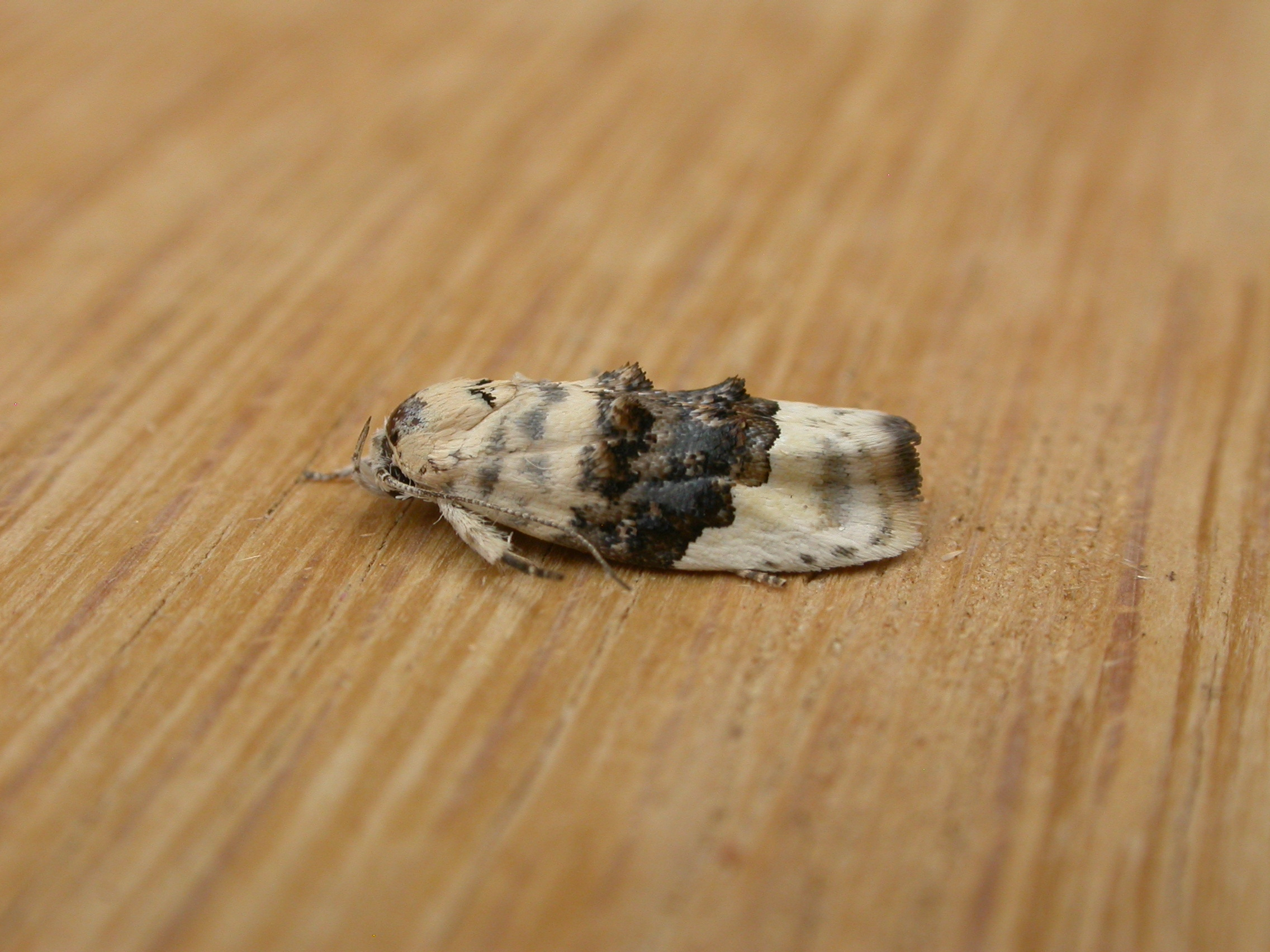

Scientific classification
- Kingdom: Animalia
- Phylum: Arthropoda
- Class: Insecta
- Order: Lepidoptera
- Family: Oecophoridae
- Genus: Piloprepes
- Species: P. antidoxa

Binomial name
- Piloprepes antidoxa Meyrick, 1889

= Piloprepes antidoxa =

Species of moth

Piloprepes antidoxa is a moth of the family Oecophoridae. It is found in Australia.
