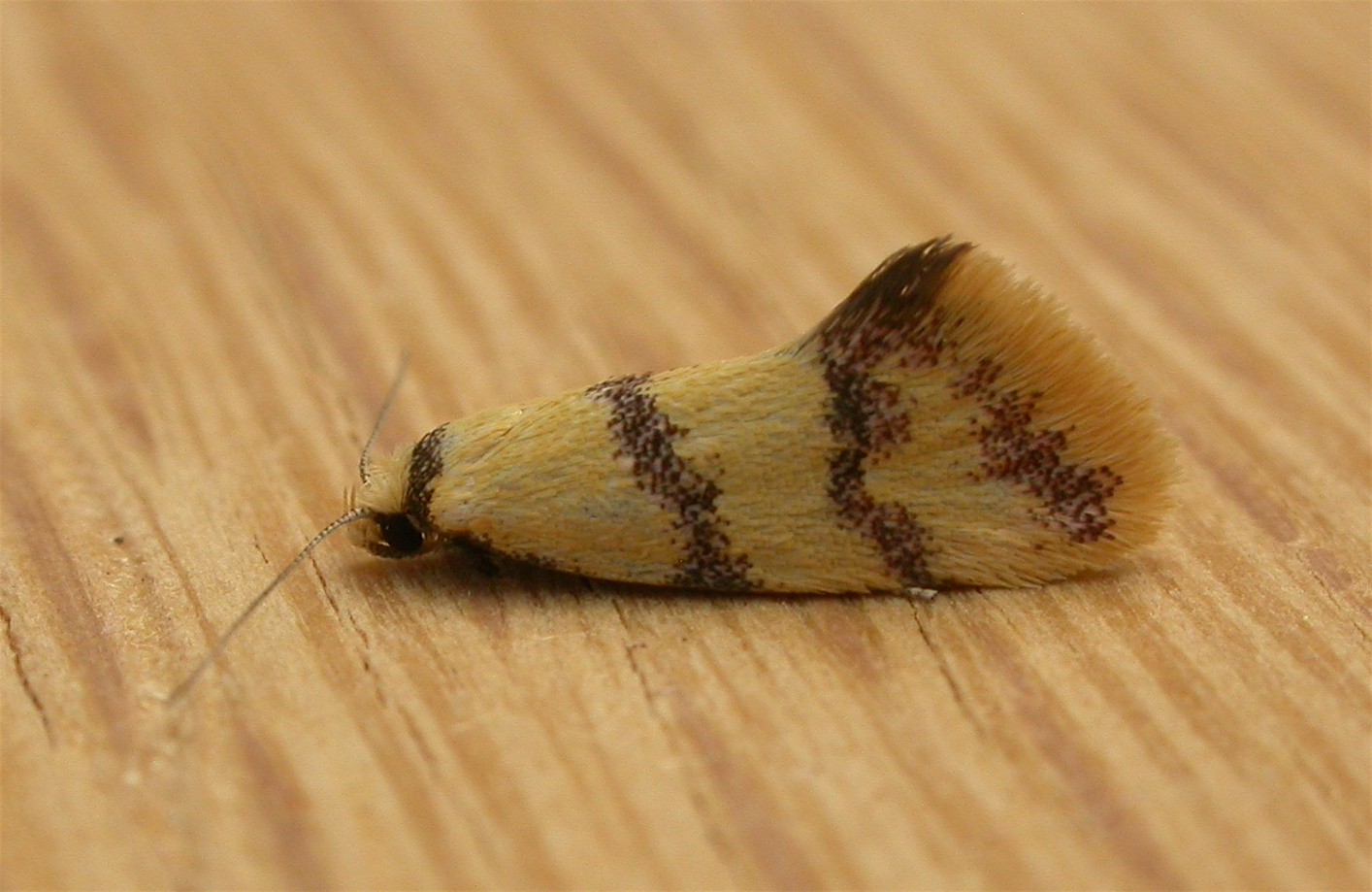

Scientific classification
- Kingdom: Animalia
- Phylum: Arthropoda
- Clade: Pancrustacea
- Class: Insecta
- Order: Lepidoptera
- Family: Oecophoridae
- Genus: Psaroxantha
- Species: P. calligenes

Binomial name
- Psaroxantha calligenes Meyrick, 1886

= Psaroxantha calligenes =

Species of moth

Psaroxantha calligenes is a moth of the family Oecophoridae. It is found in Australia, including Tasmania.
