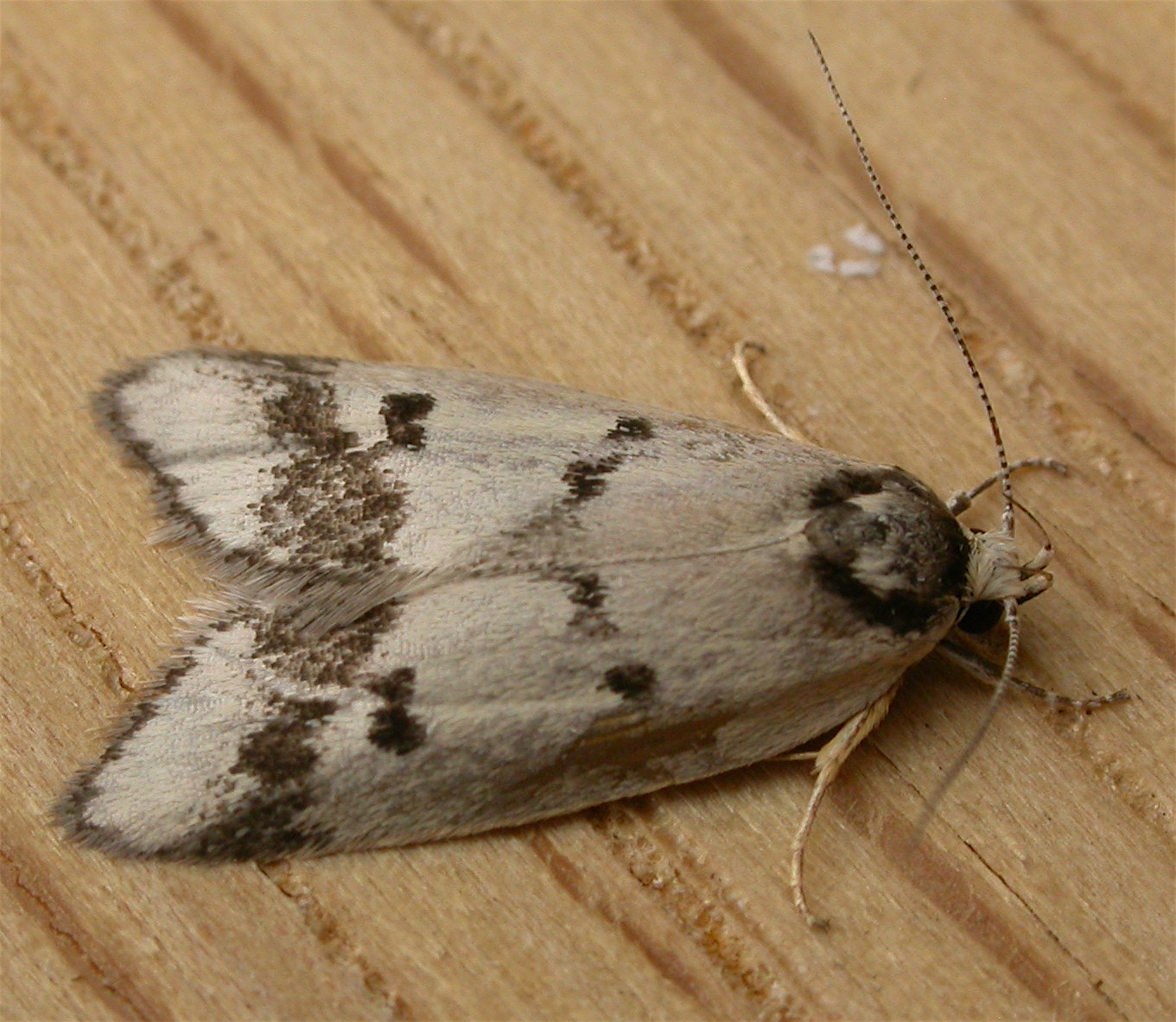

Scientific classification
- Kingdom: Animalia
- Phylum: Arthropoda
- Clade: Pancrustacea
- Class: Insecta
- Order: Lepidoptera
- Family: Oecophoridae
- Genus: Compsotropha
- Species: C. selenias

Binomial name
- Compsotropha selenias Meyrick, 1884

= Compsotropha selenias =

Species of moth

Compsotropha selenias is a moth of the family Oecophoridae. It is found in Australia, including Tasmania. Caterpillars of the species feed on Eucalyptus spp.

== Description ==
Caterpillars of Compsotropha selenias are off-white and live in shelters constructed from leaves and silk.

Adults have white forewings with a number of dark brown markings, yellow hindwings, and a wingspan of approximately 2 cm.
