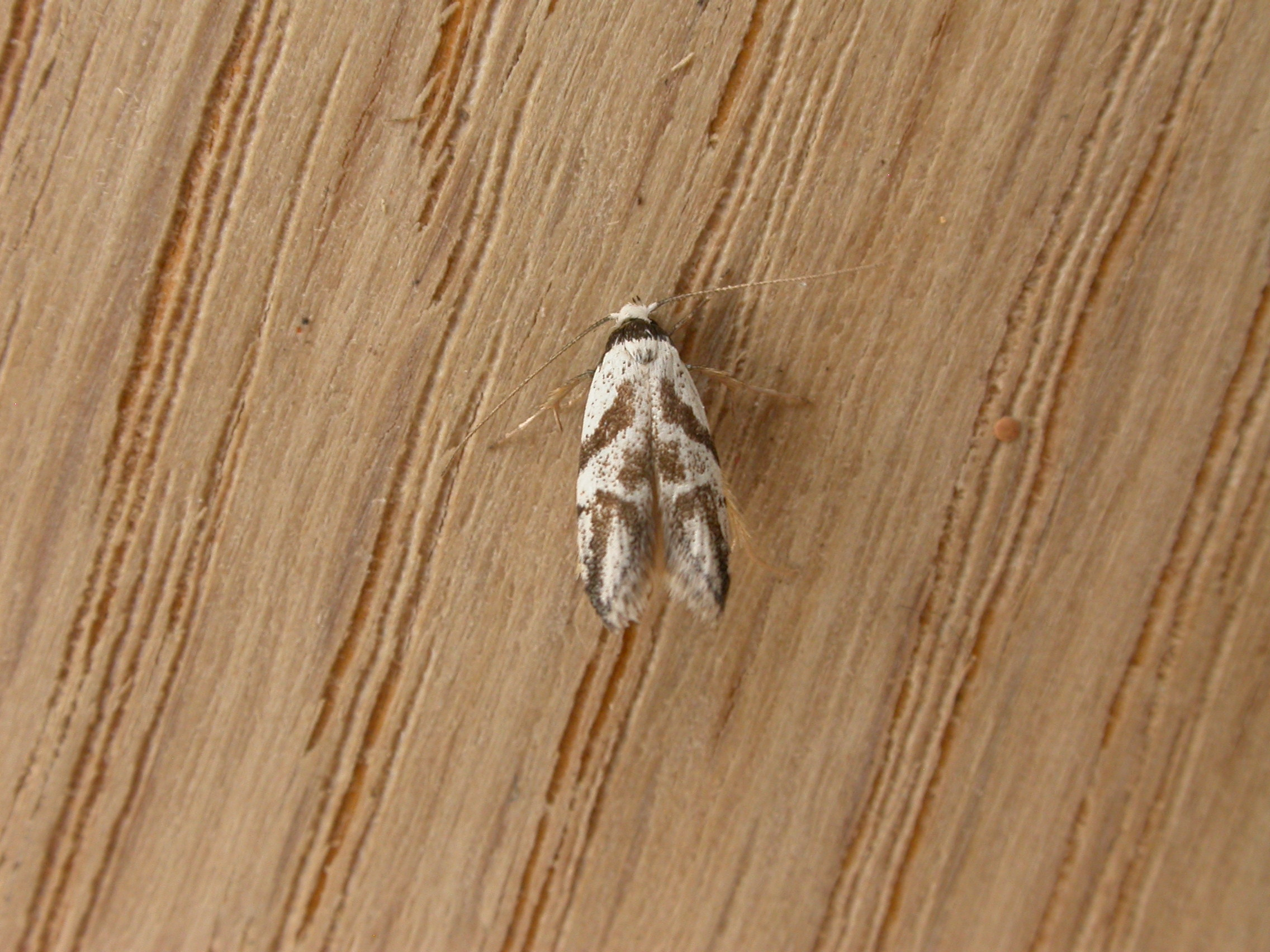

Scientific classification
- Kingdom: Animalia
- Phylum: Arthropoda
- Clade: Pancrustacea
- Class: Insecta
- Order: Lepidoptera
- Family: Oecophoridae
- Genus: Oxythecta
- Species: O. acceptella

Binomial name
- Oxythecta acceptella Walker, 1864

Synonyms
- Oecophora acceptella; Cryptolechia abstersella; Oecophora connexella

= Oxythecta acceptella =

Species of moth

Oxythecta acceptella is a moth of the family Oecophoridae. It is found in Australia.
