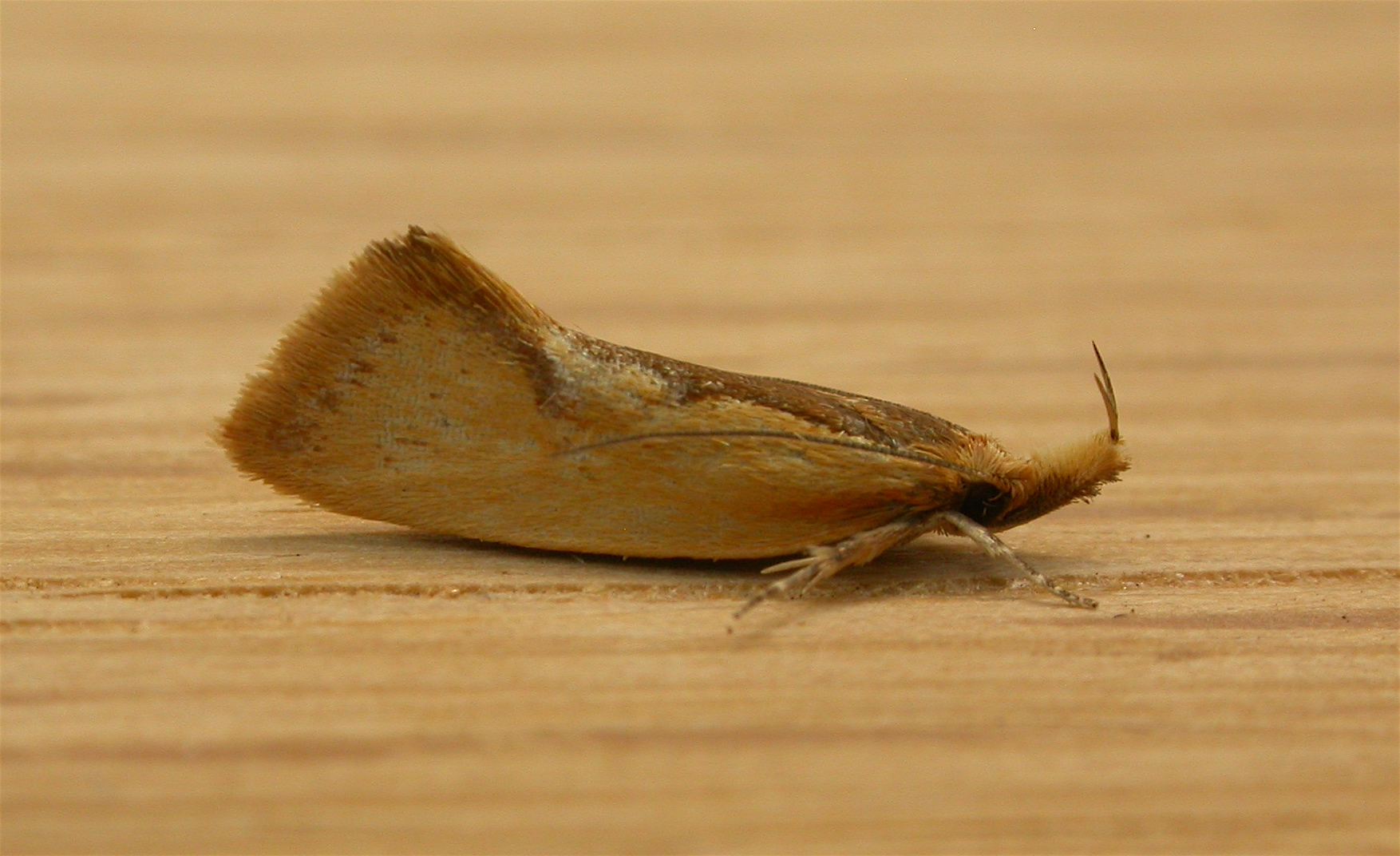

Scientific classification
- Kingdom: Animalia
- Phylum: Arthropoda
- Class: Insecta
- Order: Lepidoptera
- Family: Oecophoridae
- Genus: Thema
- Species: T. psammoxantha

Binomial name
- Thema psammoxantha Meyrick, 1884

= Thema psammoxantha =

Species of moth

Thema psammoxantha is a moth of the family Oecophoridae. It is found in Australia.
