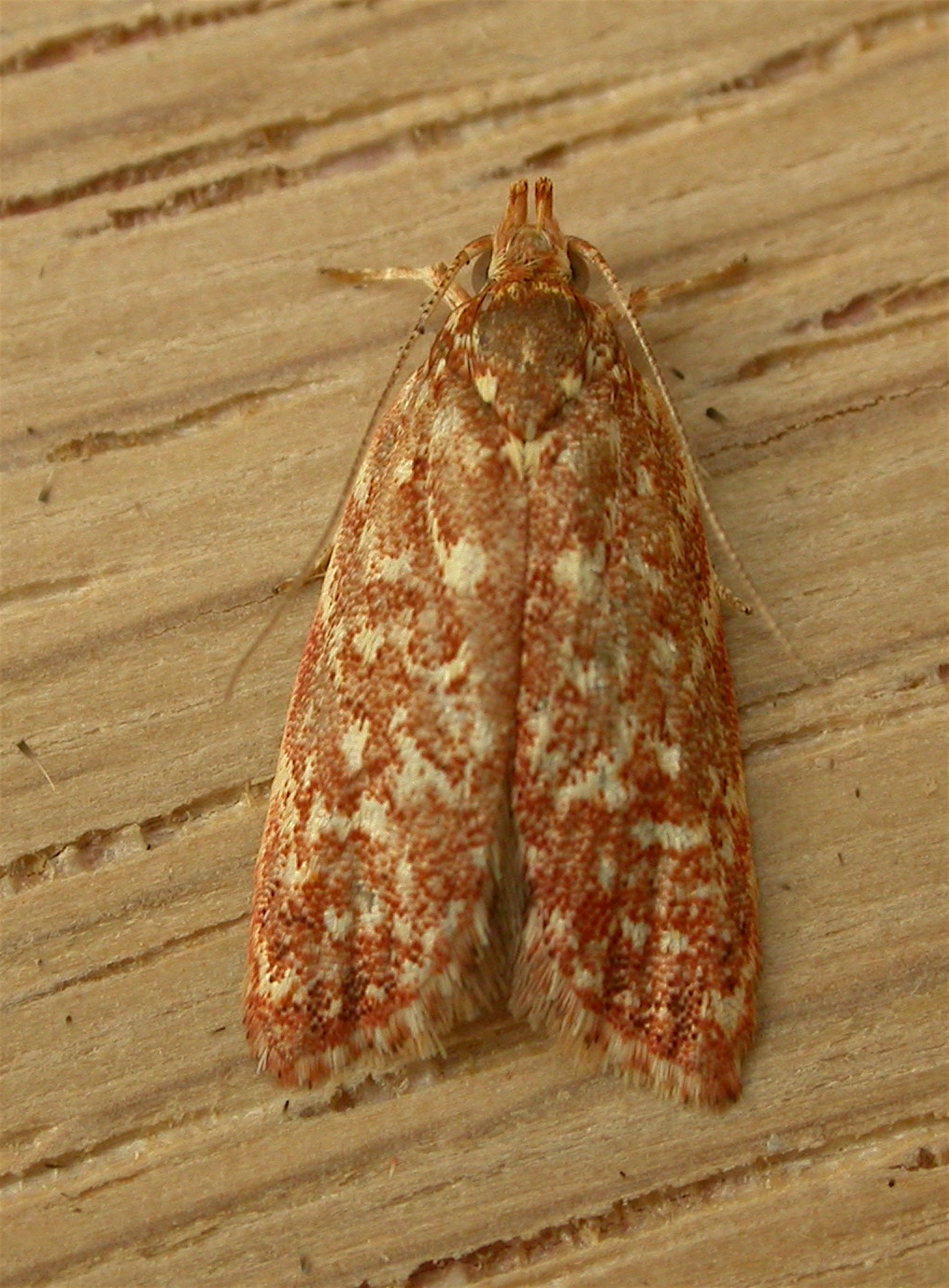

Scientific classification
- Kingdom: Animalia
- Phylum: Arthropoda
- Class: Insecta
- Order: Lepidoptera
- Family: Oecophoridae
- Genus: Syringoseca
- Species: S. rhodoxantha

Binomial name
- Syringoseca rhodoxantha Meyrick, 1888

= Syringoseca rhodoxantha =

Species of moth

Syringoseca rhodoxantha is a moth of the family Oecophoridae. It is found in Australia, including New South Wales, Queensland, Australian Capital Territory, Victoria and South Australia.
