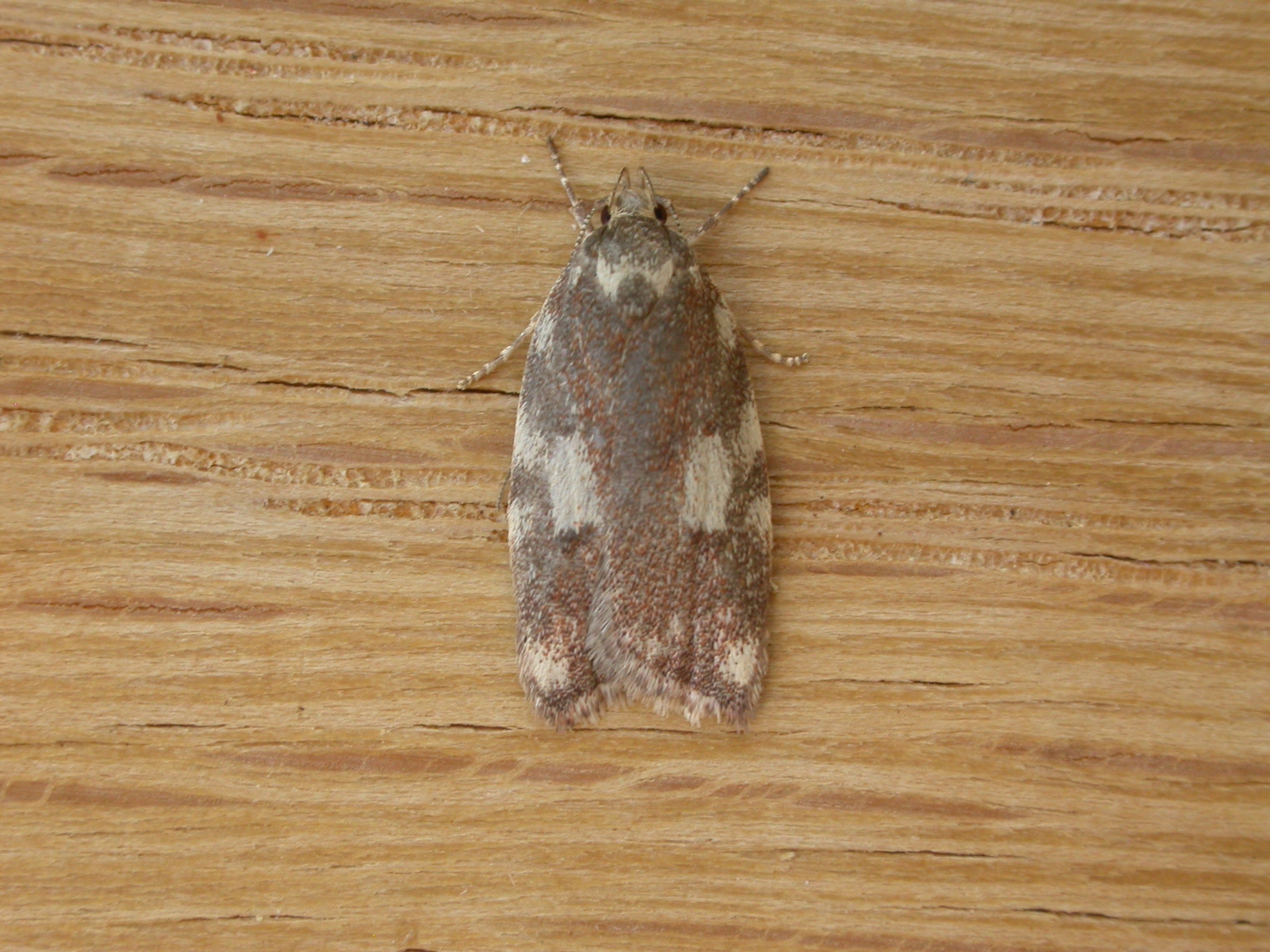

Scientific classification
- Kingdom: Animalia
- Phylum: Arthropoda
- Class: Insecta
- Order: Lepidoptera
- Family: Oecophoridae
- Genus: Syringoseca
- Species: S. mimica

Binomial name
- Syringoseca mimica (Meyrick, 1888)

Synonyms
- Heliocausta mimica Meyrick, 1888

= Syringoseca mimica =

Species of moth

Syringoseca mimica is a moth of the family Oecophoridae. It is known from the Australian Capital Territory, New South Wales, Queensland, South Australia, Tasmania, Victoria and Western Australia.

The wingspan is about 20 mm. Adults have brown forewings with darker patches and speckles.
