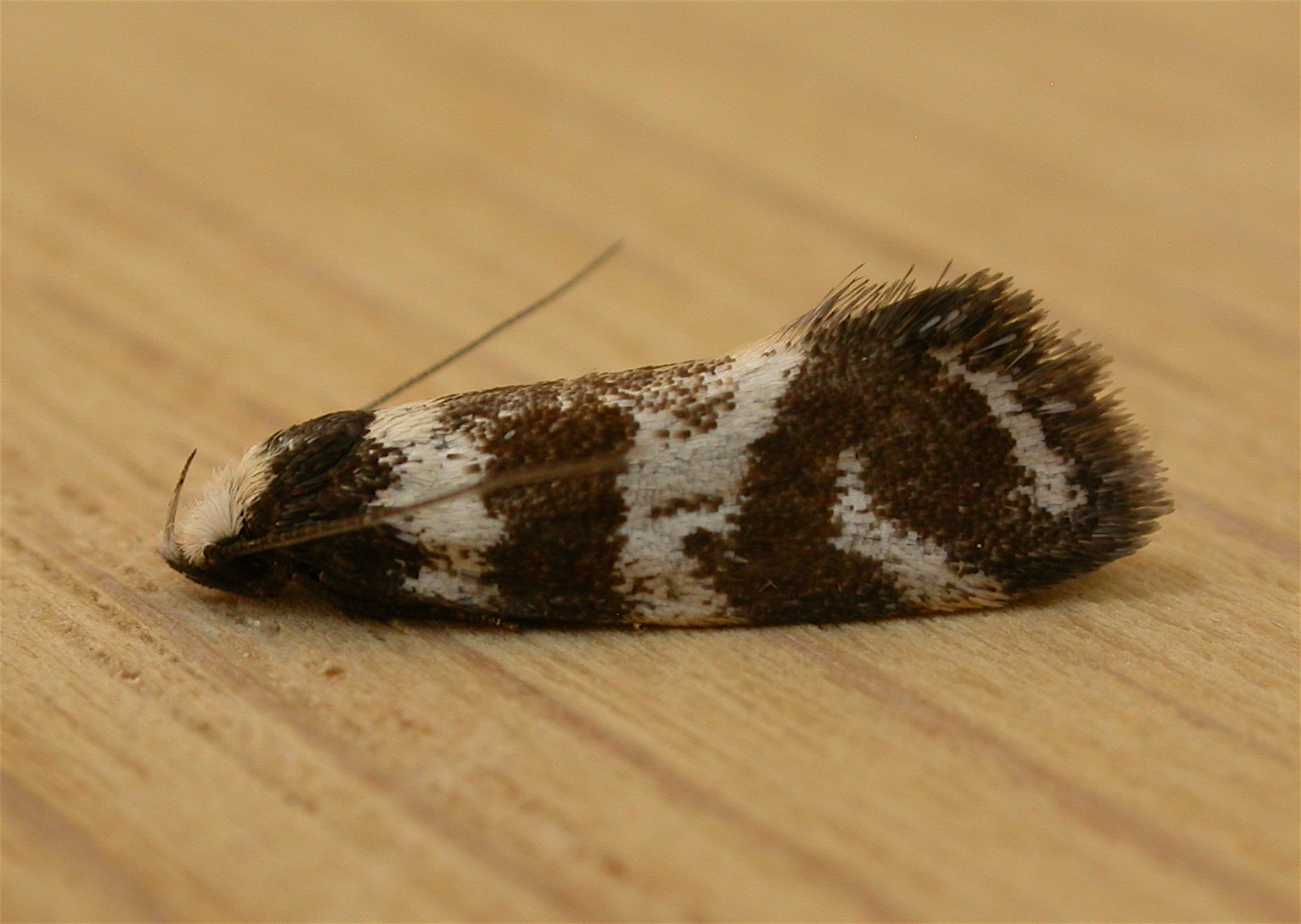

Scientific classification
- Kingdom: Animalia
- Phylum: Arthropoda
- Clade: Pancrustacea
- Class: Insecta
- Order: Lepidoptera
- Family: Oecophoridae
- Genus: Isomoralla
- Species: I. eriscota

Binomial name
- Isomoralla eriscota (Meyrick, 1889)

Synonyms
- Philobota eriscota

= Isomoralla eriscota =

Species of moth

Isomoralla eriscota is a species of moth in the family Oecophoridae and occurs in Australia. The adult has brown forewings with lighter brown bands.
