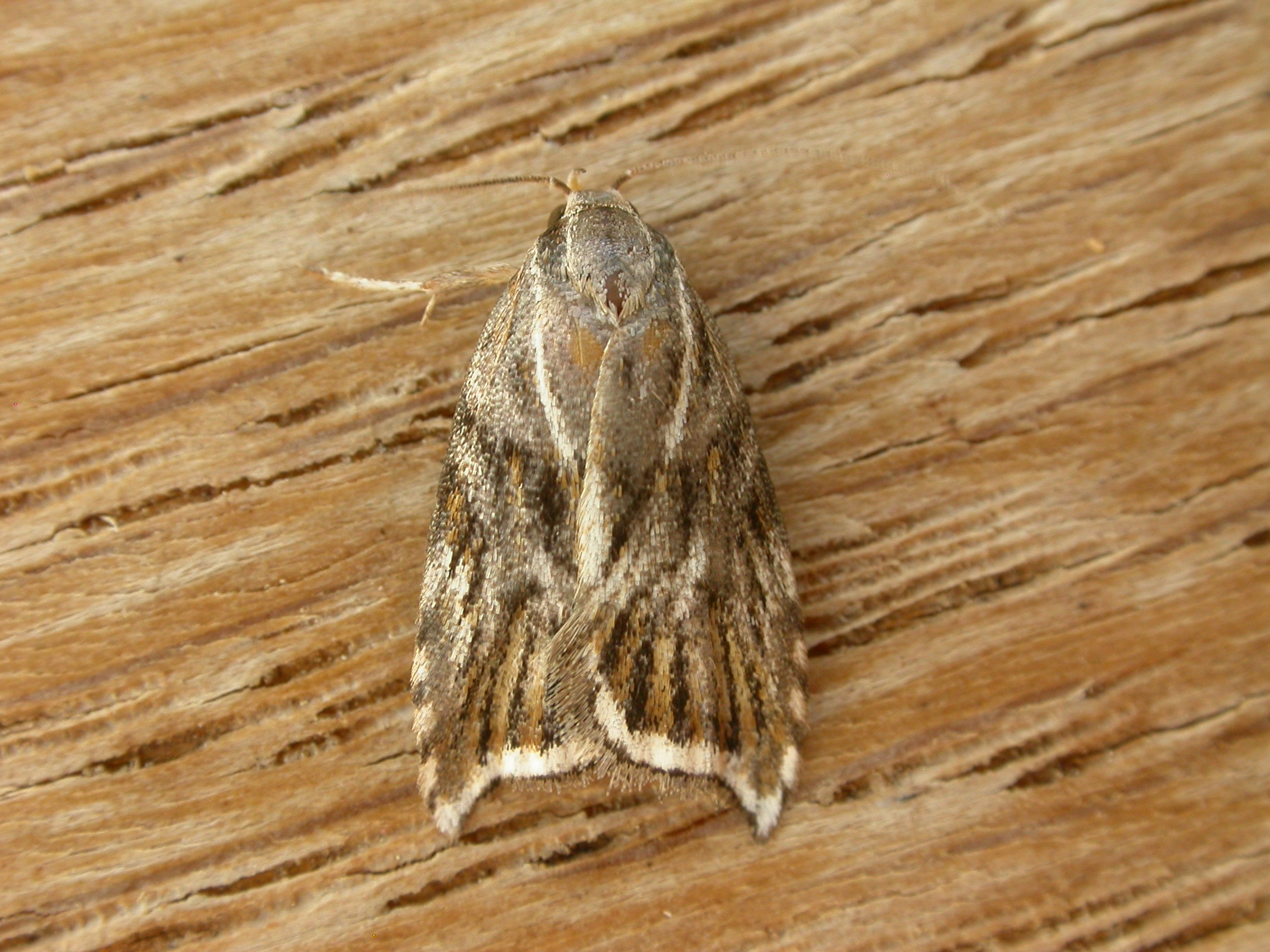

Scientific classification
- Kingdom: Animalia
- Phylum: Arthropoda
- Clade: Pancrustacea
- Class: Insecta
- Order: Lepidoptera
- Family: Oecophoridae
- Genus: Tortricopsis
- Species: T. aulacois

Binomial name
- Tortricopsis aulacois (Meyrick, 1883)

Synonyms
- Palparia aulacois Meyrick, 1883

= Tortricopsis aulacois =

Species of moth

Tortricopsis aulacois is a moth of the family Oecophoridae. It occurs in Australia and is known from the Australian Capital Territory, New South Wales, Queensland, Victoria, and Tasmania.

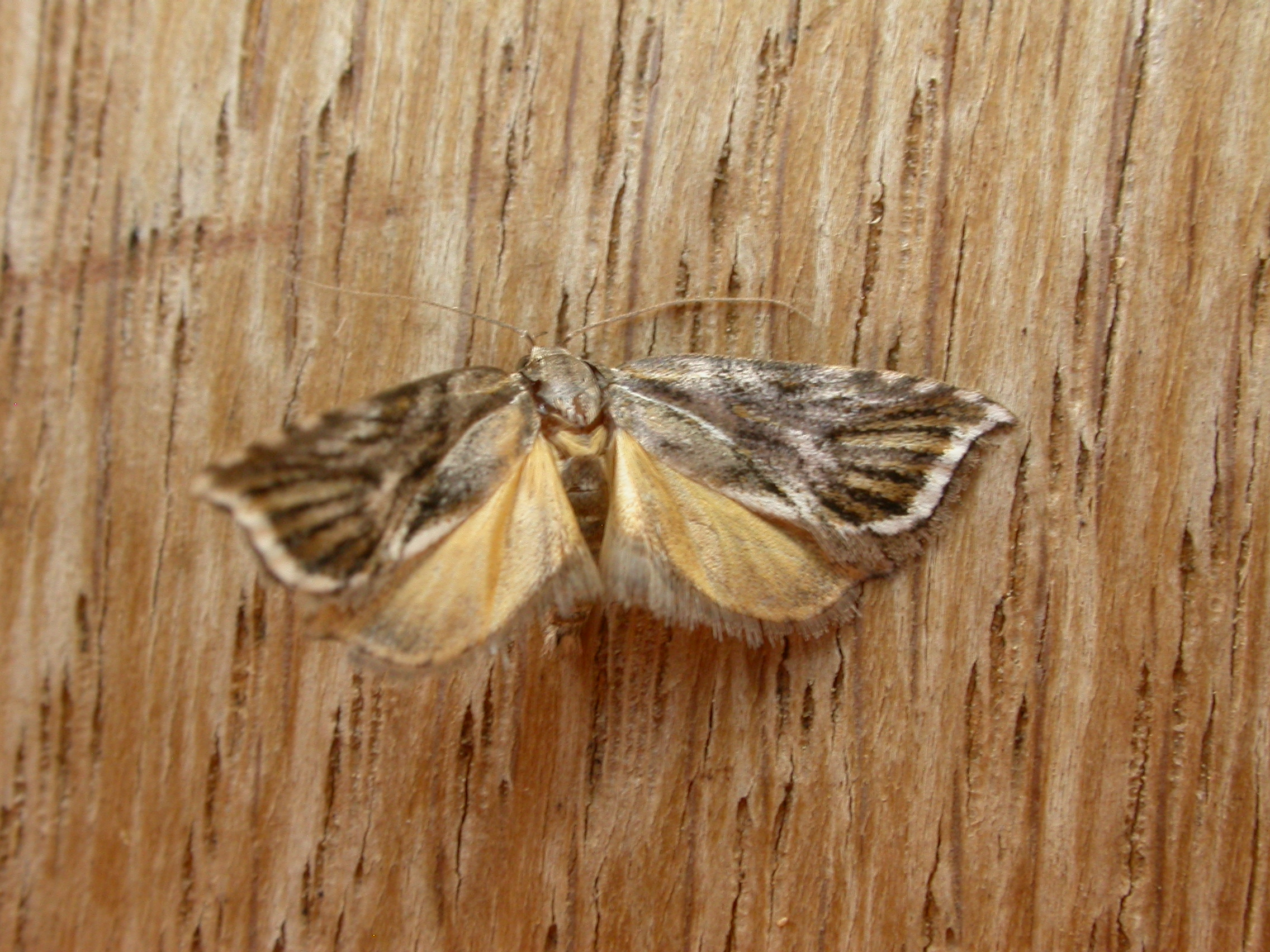
