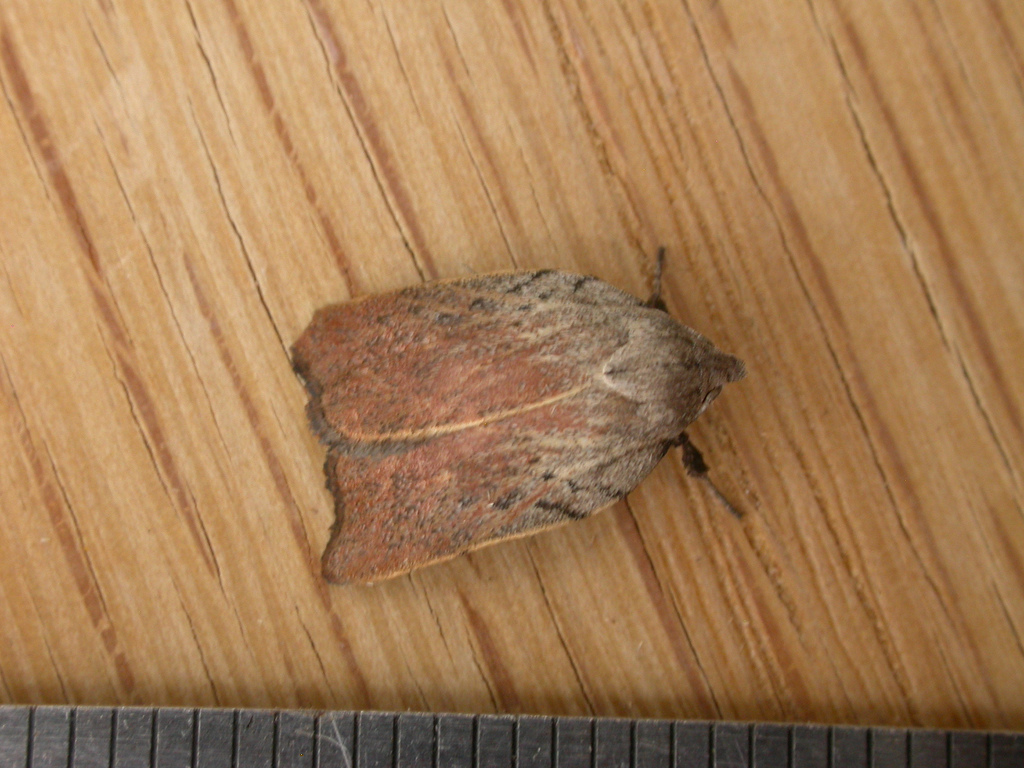

Scientific classification
- Kingdom: Animalia
- Phylum: Arthropoda
- Clade: Pancrustacea
- Class: Insecta
- Order: Lepidoptera
- Family: Oecophoridae
- Genus: Tortricopsis
- Species: T. pyroptis

Binomial name
- Tortricopsis pyroptis Meyrick, 1902

Synonyms
- Tortricopsis erythrura Meyrick, 1914; Palparia pyroptis Lower, 1896 (nomen nudum)

= Tortricopsis pyroptis =

Species of moth

Tortricopsis pyroptis is a moth of the family Oecophoridae. It is found in Australia.

The larvae feed on Exocarpos, Pinus, Cupressus, and Acacia.
