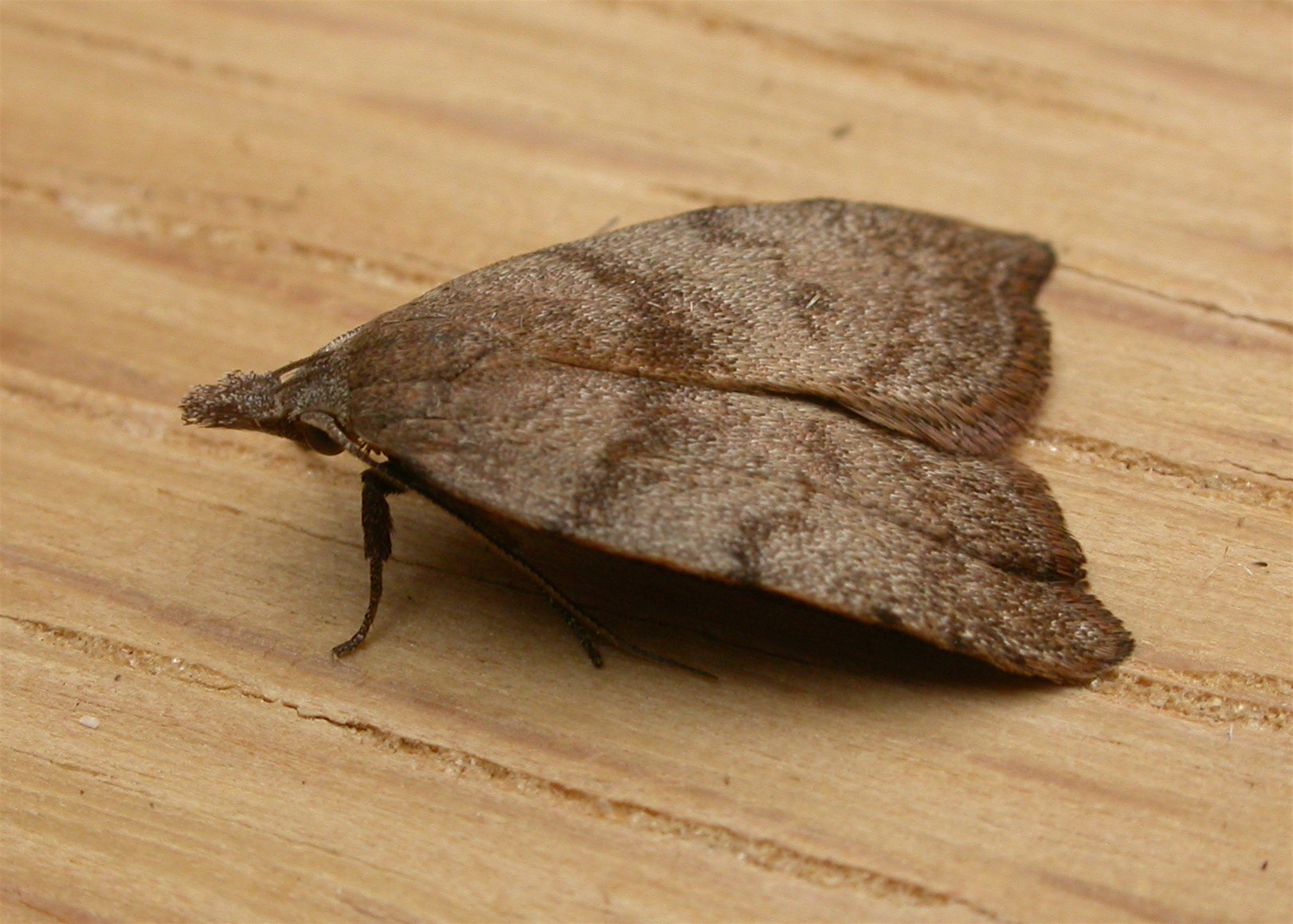

Scientific classification
- Kingdom: Animalia
- Phylum: Arthropoda
- Clade: Pancrustacea
- Class: Insecta
- Order: Lepidoptera
- Family: Oecophoridae
- Genus: Tortricopsis
- Species: T. euryphanella

Binomial name
- Tortricopsis euryphanella (Meyrick, 1883)

Synonyms
- Palparia euryphanella Meyrick, 1883

= Tortricopsis euryphanella =

Species of moth

Tortricopsis euryphanella is a moth of the family Oecophoridae. It is found in Australia, specifically in Tasmania (including Launceston, its type locality) and Victoria.
