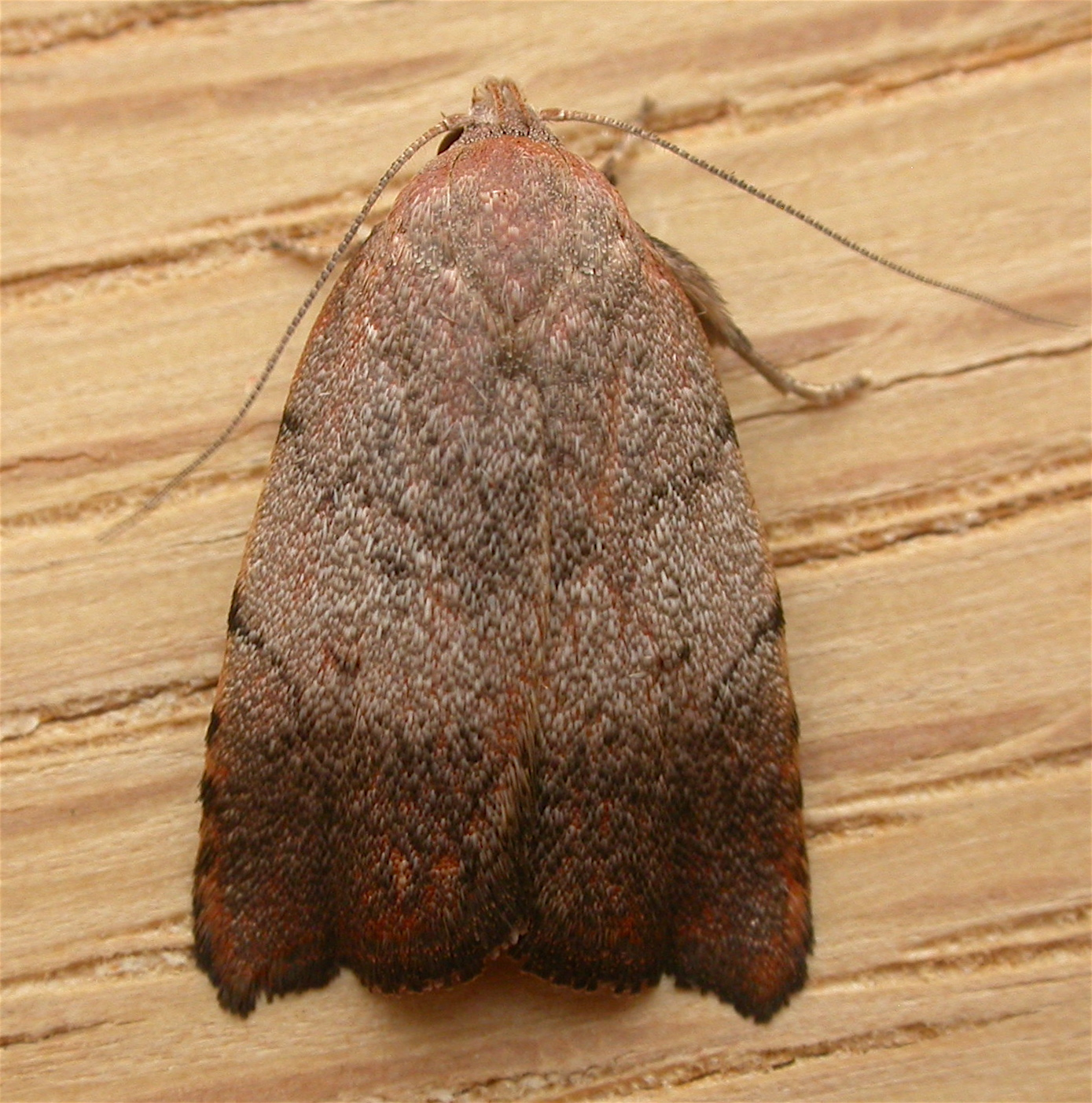

Scientific classification
- Kingdom: Animalia
- Phylum: Arthropoda
- Clade: Pancrustacea
- Class: Insecta
- Order: Lepidoptera
- Family: Oecophoridae
- Genus: Tortricopsis
- Species: T. semijunctella

Binomial name
- Tortricopsis semijunctella Walker, 1864

= Tortricopsis semijunctella =

Species of moth

Tortricopsis semijunctella is a moth of the family Oecophoridae. It is found in Australia. The wingspan is about 2 cm (0.79 in).

The larvae feed on dead leaves of Eucalyptus species and various parts of Pinus radiata. It can also be a pest on Juniperus.
