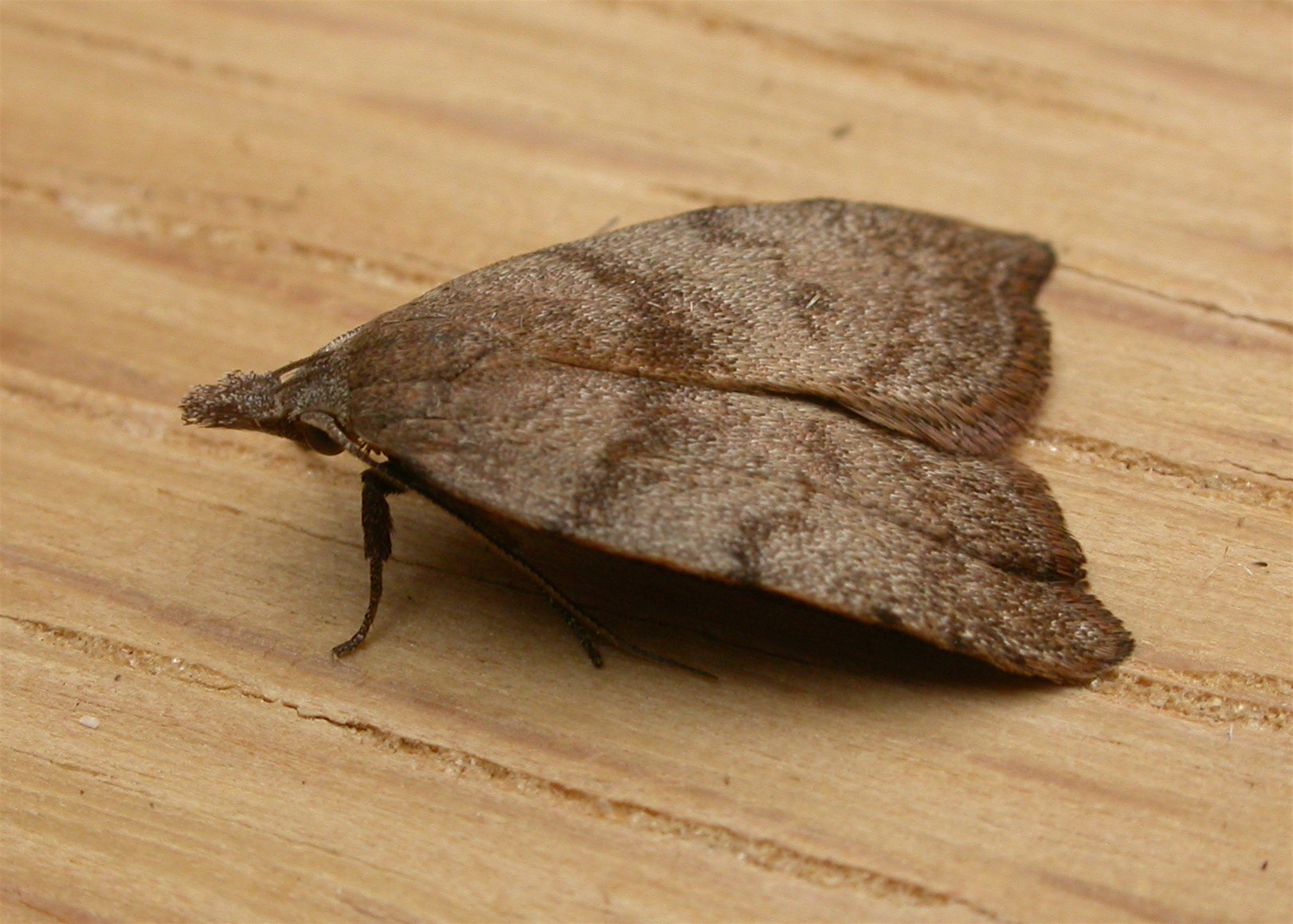
- Tortricopsis euryphanella

Scientific classification
- Kingdom: Animalia
- Phylum: Arthropoda
- Clade: Pancrustacea
- Class: Insecta
- Order: Lepidoptera
- Family: Oecophoridae
- Subfamily: Oecophorinae
- Genus: Tortricopsis; Newman, 1856

Type species
- Tortricopsis rosabella Newman, 1856

Synonyms
- Trigonophylla Turner, 1919

= Tortricopsis =

Genus of moths

Tortricopsis is a genus of moths in the subfamily Oecophorinae of the family Oecophoridae. It occurs in Australia.

== Species ==
There are seven recognized species:

- Tortricopsis aulacois Meyrick, 1883
- Tortricopsis crocopepla Turner, 1946
- Tortricopsis euryphanella Meyrick, 1883
- Tortricopsis hesychaea (Meyrick, 1886)
- Tortricopsis pyroptis Meyrick, 1902
- Tortricopsis semijunctella Walker, 1864
- Tortricopsis uncinella Zeller, 1854

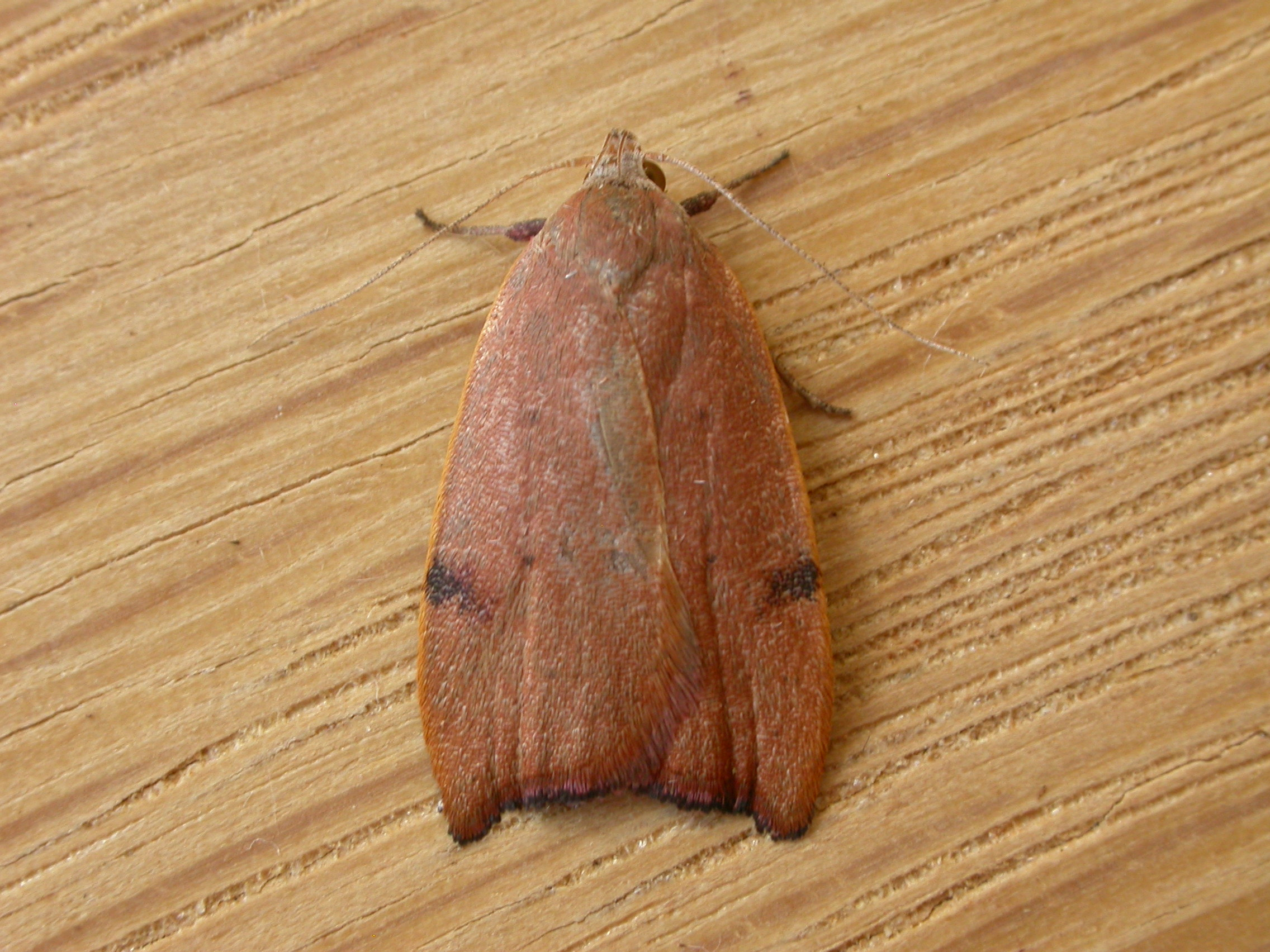
Tortricopsis uncinella from the Australian Capital Territory .
