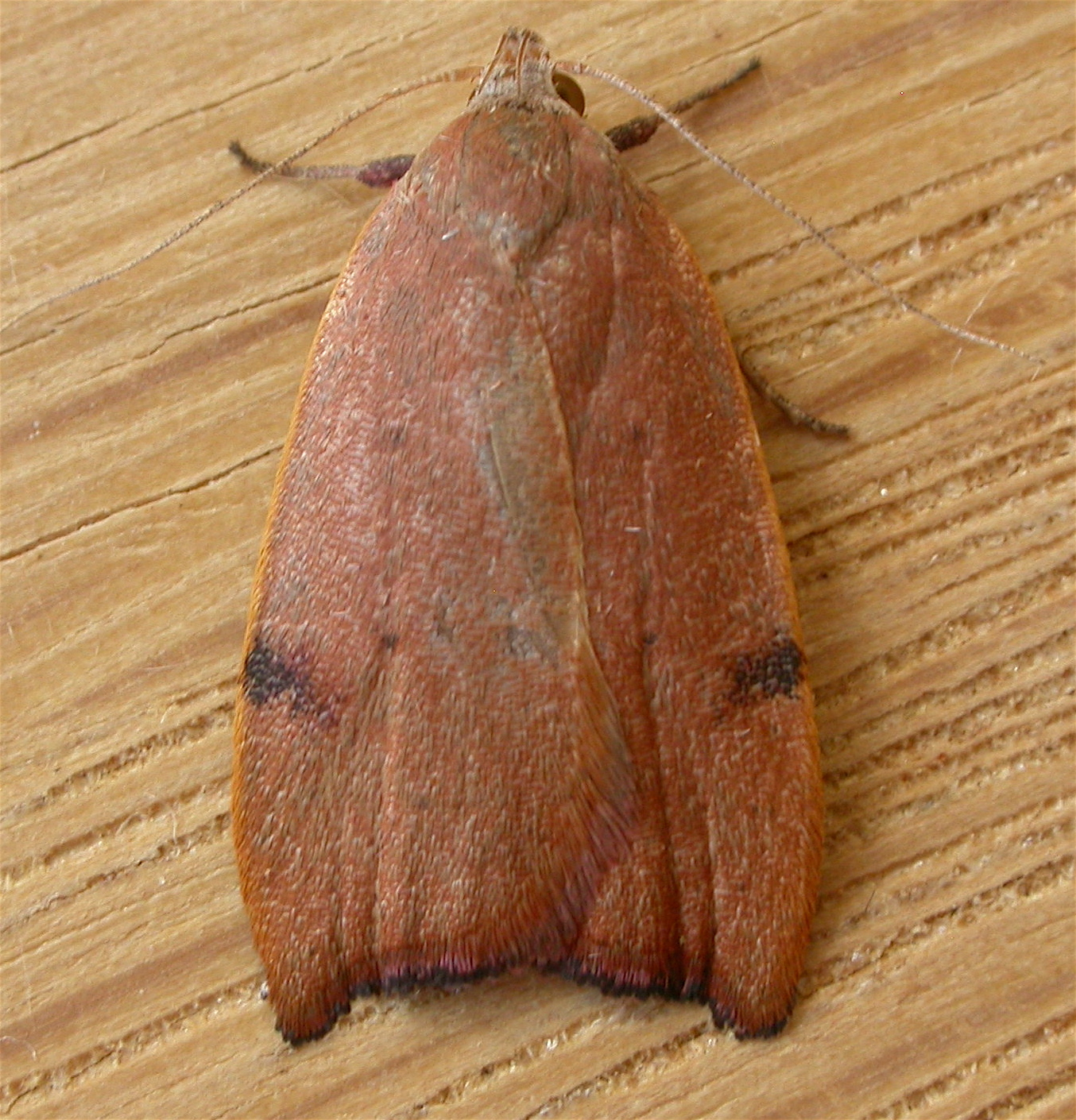

Scientific classification
- Kingdom: Animalia
- Phylum: Arthropoda
- Clade: Pancrustacea
- Class: Insecta
- Order: Lepidoptera
- Family: Oecophoridae
- Genus: Tortricopsis
- Species: T. uncinella

Binomial name
- Tortricopsis uncinella (Zeller, 1854)

Synonyms
- Cryptolechia uncinella Zeller, 1854; Tortricopsis rosabella Newman, 1856

= Tortricopsis uncinella =

Species of moth

Tortricopsis uncinella is a moth of the family Oecophoridae. It is found in Australia, including Tasmania. It uses Eucalyptus as the host.
