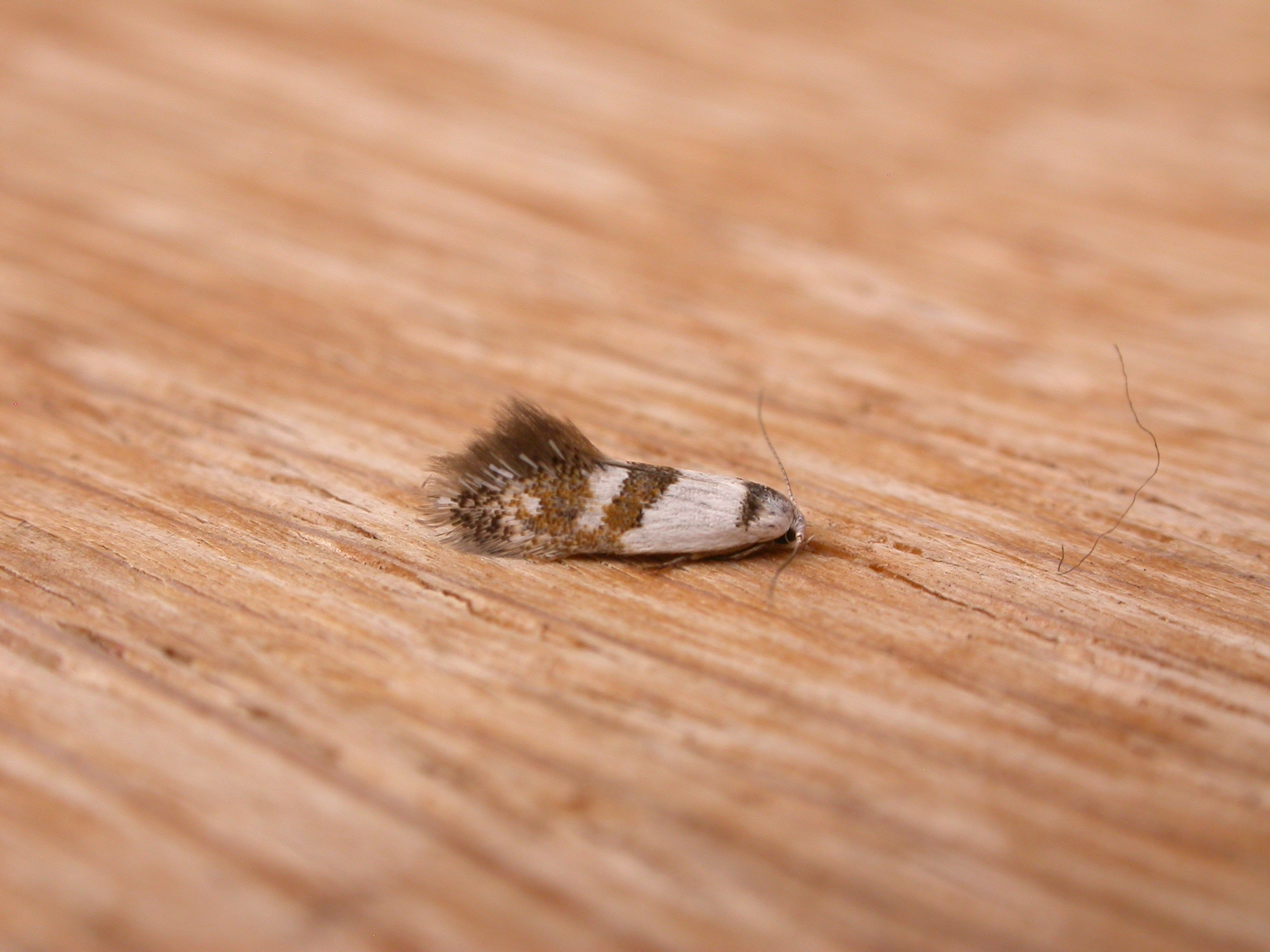
- Notodryas vallata

Scientific classification
- Kingdom: Animalia
- Phylum: Arthropoda
- Class: Insecta
- Order: Lepidoptera
- Family: Epermeniidae
- Genus: Notodryas; Meyrick, 1897

= Notodryas =

Genus of moths

Notodryas is a genus of moths in the family Epermeniidae. Its species all occur in Australia.

== Species ==
- Notodryas aeria Meyrick, 1897
- Notodryas callierga Meyrick, 1906
- Notodryas encrita (Lower, 1920)
- Notodryas vallata Meyrick, 1897
