= Notodryas encrita =

Scientific classification
- Kingdom: Animalia
- Phylum: Arthropoda
- Class: Insecta
- Order: Lepidoptera
- Family: Epermeniidae
- Genus: Notodryas
- Species: N. encrita

Binomial name
- Notodryas encrita (Lower, 1920)

Synonyms
- Machaeritis encrita Lower, 1920

Species of moth

Notodryas encrita is a moth in the family Epermeniidae. It was described by Oswald Bertram Lower in 1920. It is found in Australia, where it has been recorded from South Australia and Victoria.

The wingspan is about 10 mm. The forewings are white, faintly tinged with ochreous and with ochreous-fuscous markings. The hindwings are pale fuscous.
