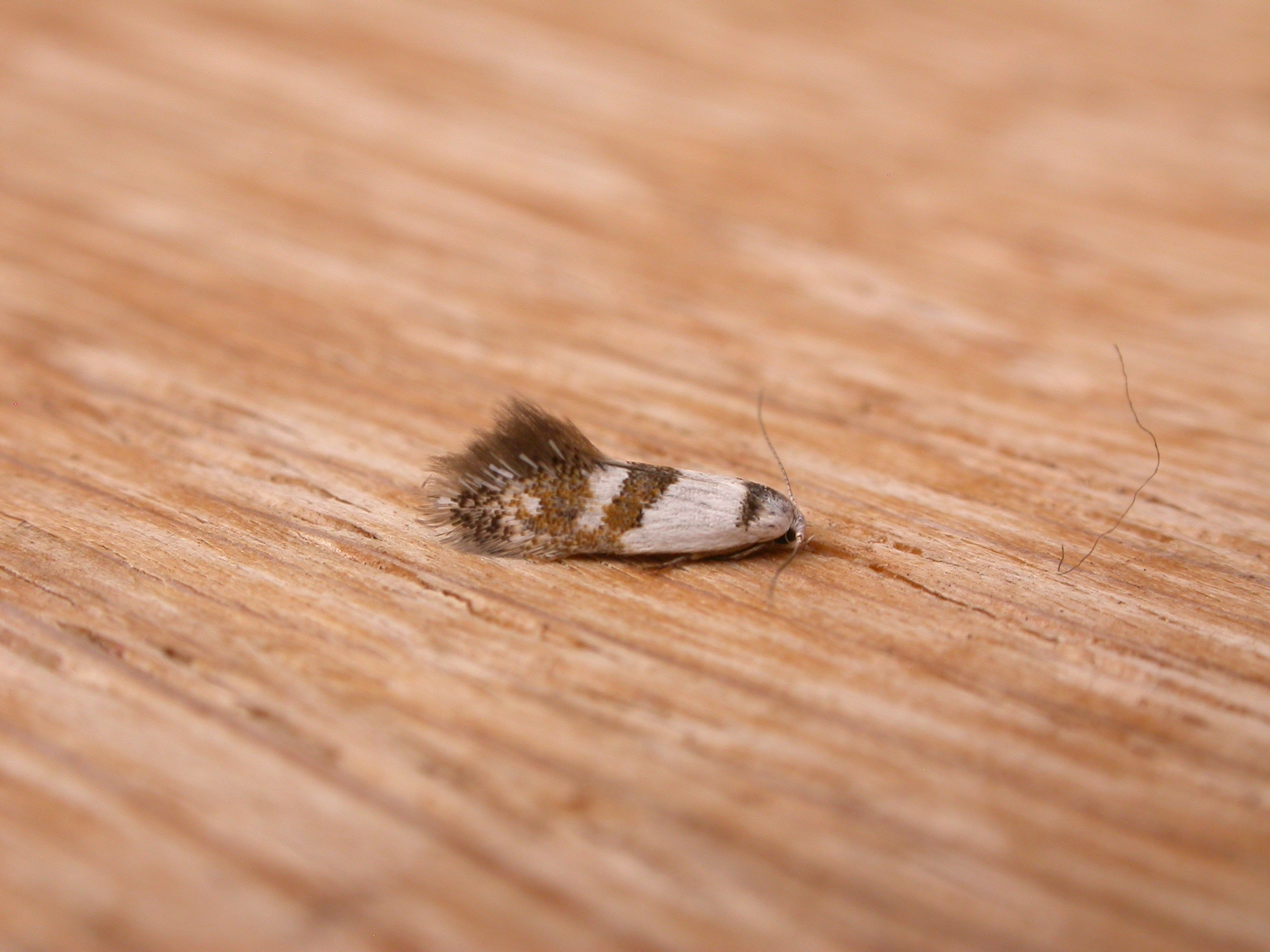

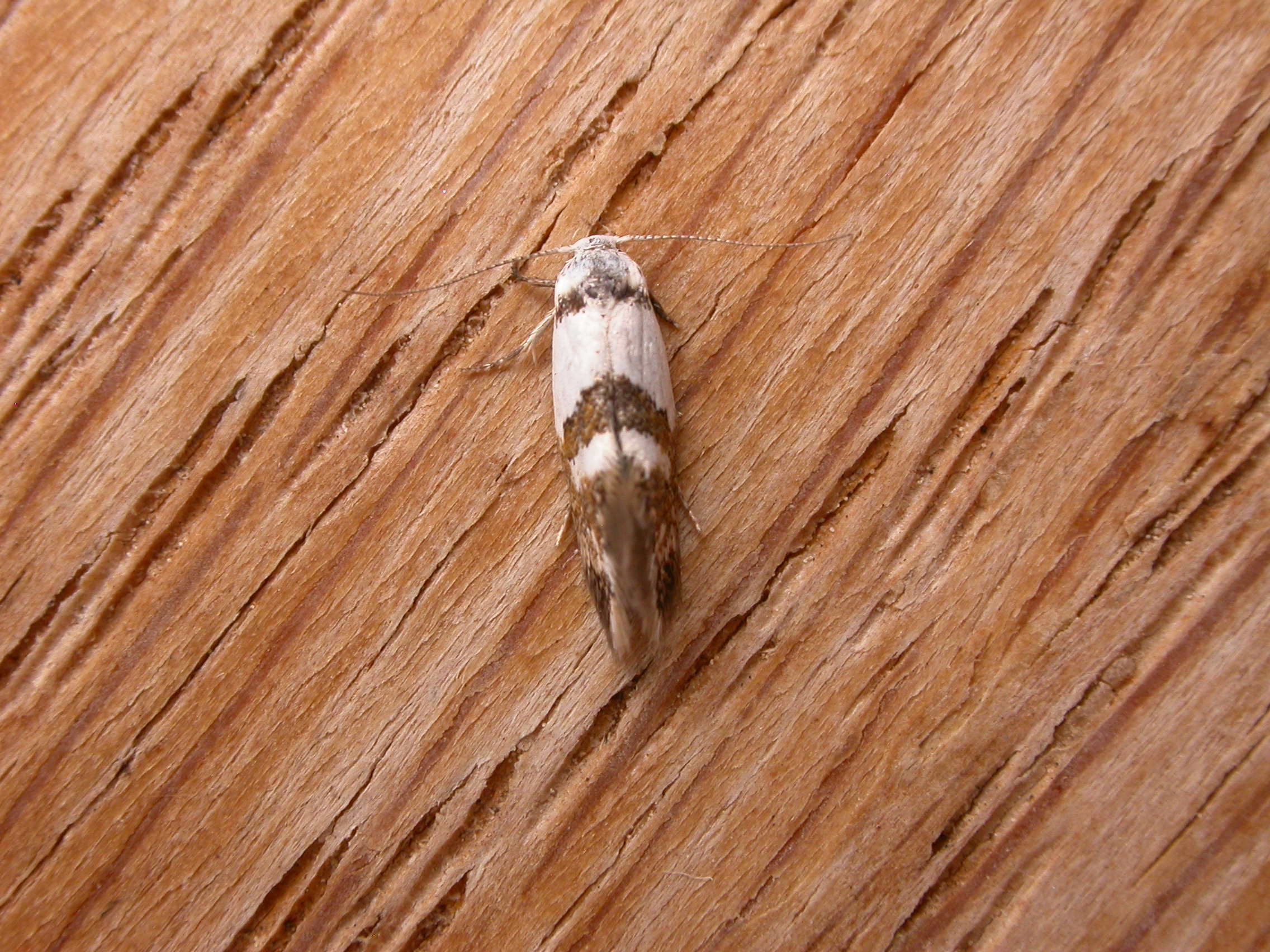

Scientific classification
- Kingdom: Animalia
- Phylum: Arthropoda
- Class: Insecta
- Order: Lepidoptera
- Family: Epermeniidae
- Genus: Notodryas
- Species: N. vallata

Binomial name
- Notodryas vallata Meyrick, 1897

= Notodryas vallata =

Species of moth

Notodryas vallata is a moth of the family Epermeniidae. It is known from the Australian Capital Territory, New South Wales and Victoria.

The wingspan is 8–10 mm. The forewings are white with two bright ferruginous fasciae, mixed with black dorsally and sometimes black-edged in the disc. The first is median, inwardly oblique and the second opposite the tornus, vertical, confluent on the costa and sometimes connected in the disc. There are ferruginous streaks from the second fascia along the costa and termen to the apex, sometimes undefined or indistinct, sometimes terminating in an apical spot of black scales. The hindwings are dark fuscous.

The larvae feed on the leaves of Eucalyptus macrorhyncha. They tie the leaves of their host plant with silk.
