= Notodryas aeria =

Scientific classification
- Kingdom: Animalia
- Phylum: Arthropoda
- Class: Insecta
- Order: Lepidoptera
- Family: Epermeniidae
- Genus: Notodryas
- Species: N. aeria

Binomial name
- Notodryas aeria Meyrick, 1897

Species of moth

Notodryas aeria is a moth in the family Epermeniidae. It was described by Edward Meyrick in 1897. It is found in Australia, where it has been recorded from the Australian Capital Territory, New South Wales, Queensland, Tasmania and Victoria.

The wingspan is 9–12 mm. The forewings are white with light ochreous-yellowish markings, more or less irrorated (sprinkled) with black, more strongly towards the dorsum. There is a small spot near the base in the middle and an oblique bar from the dorsum before the middle, reaching two-thirds of the way across the wing. There is an oblique fascia from three-fourths of the costa to the tornus, more or less interrupted or indistinct. There is also a small apical spot. The hindwings are whitish, sometimes greyer posteriorly.

The larvae feed on the leaves of Eucalyptus species, tying leaves with silk.
