= Notodryas callierga =

Scientific classification
- Kingdom: Animalia
- Phylum: Arthropoda
- Class: Insecta
- Order: Lepidoptera
- Family: Epermeniidae
- Genus: Notodryas
- Species: N. callierga

Binomial name
- Notodryas callierga Meyrick, 1906

Species of moth

Notodryas callierga is a moth in the family Epermeniidae. It was described by Edward Meyrick in 1906. It is found in Australia, where it has been recorded from South Australia.

The wingspan is about 9 mm. The forewings are white with brown markings, irrorated (sprinkled) with blackish. There is an oblique mark from the dorsum near the base, reaching halfway across the wing and an oblique fascia from the dorsum beyond the middle, reaching two-thirds of the way across the wing. There is also a spot on the tornus and a longitudinal mark in the disc above it, as well as some dark scales at the apex. The hindwings are light grey.
