= Catoryctis nonolinea =

Scientific classification
- Domain: Eukaryota
- Kingdom: Animalia
- Phylum: Arthropoda
- Class: Insecta
- Order: Lepidoptera
- Family: Xyloryctidae
- Genus: Catoryctis
- Species: C. nonolinea

Binomial name
- Catoryctis nonolinea T. P. Lucas, 1894

Species of moth

Catoryctis nonolinea is a moth in the family Xyloryctidae. It was described by Thomas Pennington Lucas in 1894. It is found in Australia, where it has been recorded from New South Wales and Queensland.

The wingspan is 13–15 mm. The forewings are rich chocolate fuscous with ochreous-silvery lines and a slender attenuated streak immediately beneath the costa from the base to two-fifths, a thin line immediately beneath this at two-thirds running obliquely to two-thirds of the costa, two short thin lines immediately beyond this and parallel, a short arrowhead line immediately beyond broadening in the apical angle to the apex, with a tendency to divide at the apex, a moderately broad straight line from just before the middle of the wing to one-third of the hindmargin, with a tendency to divide before the hindmargin, a narrower line immediately beneath and parallel to this imperfectly divided on the hindmargin, a moderately broad streak from the inner margin at the base to the anal angle, with a similar line parallel and close to the inner margin. The hindwings are light shining ochreous, with a fuscous cloudy suffusion at the apical angle narrowing to a point opposite the middle of the hindmargin.

The larvae possibly feed on Casuarina species.
