= Catoryctis truncata =

Scientific classification
- Domain: Eukaryota
- Kingdom: Animalia
- Phylum: Arthropoda
- Class: Insecta
- Order: Lepidoptera
- Family: Xyloryctidae
- Genus: Catoryctis
- Species: C. truncata

Binomial name
- Catoryctis truncata T. P. Lucas, 1902

Species of moth

Catoryctis truncata is a moth in the family Xyloryctidae. It was described by Thomas Pennington Lucas in 1902. It is found in Australia, where it has been recorded from New South Wales and Queensland.

The wingspan is about 20 mm. The forewings are ochreous, with white bands and blackish-fuscous lines and bands, and with four longitudinal bands of ground colour, the first along the costa, thinning out towards the apex and base, and is bounded by a subcostal silver-white line from the base to beyond half of the costa. The second line is median and is suffused with silvery white and the third line is immediately before the inner margin and the fourth is inner marginal, both are from near the base of the inner margin and thin out towards the apex. The space between the first and second lines is deep blackish fuscous, and is divided by eight lines of ground colour, running obliquely outwards from the median to the costa, the apical ones gradually become shorter. The second space between the second and third bands is blackish fuscous and is divided in the hindmarginal third by four ground colour longitudinal parallel lines. The hindwings are light grey shaded with darker fuscous and with the veins darker.

The larvae feed on Casuarina species.
