= Catoryctis leucomerata =

Scientific classification
- Domain: Eukaryota
- Kingdom: Animalia
- Phylum: Arthropoda
- Class: Insecta
- Order: Lepidoptera
- Family: Xyloryctidae
- Genus: Catoryctis
- Species: C. leucomerata

Binomial name
- Catoryctis leucomerata (Lower, 1893)

Synonyms
- Phthonerodes leucomerata Lower, 1893

Species of moth

Catoryctis leucomerata is a moth in the family Xyloryctidae. It was described by Oswald Bertram Lower in 1893. It is found in Australia, where it has been recorded from New South Wales, Queensland, South Australia, Victoria and Western Australia.

The wingspan is about 17 mm. The forewings are pale ochreous with a suffused reddish patch of scales above the inner margin near the base and there are some scattered fuscous scales mixed with white from the base along the inner margin to the anal angle. There is an indistinct irregular line from one-fourth of the costa to one-third of the inner margin. A similar line runs from five-sixths of the costa to above the anal angle, the included space is strongly irrorated (sprinkled) with white, and all veins tending to be marked with black. The hindwings are grey, paler towards base.
