= Catoryctis =

Scientific classification
- Domain: Eukaryota
- Kingdom: Animalia
- Phylum: Arthropoda
- Class: Insecta
- Order: Lepidoptera
- Family: Xyloryctidae
- Genus: Catoryctis; Meyrick, 1890

Moth genus in family Xyloryctidae

Catoryctis is a genus of moths of the family Xyloryctidae.

== Species ==
- Catoryctis eugramma Meyrick, 1890
- Catoryctis leucomerata (Lower, 1893)
- Catoryctis mediolinea Lucas, 1894
- Catoryctis nonolinea Lucas, 1894
- Catoryctis perichalca Lower, 1923
- Catoryctis polysticha Lower, 1893
- Catoryctis sciastis (Meyrick, 1915)
- Catoryctis subnexella (Walker, 1864)
- Catoryctis subparallela (Walker, 1864)
- Catoryctis tricrena Meyrick, 1890
- Catoryctis truncata Lucas, 1902
