= Catoryctis sciastis =

Scientific classification
- Kingdom: Animalia
- Phylum: Arthropoda
- Class: Insecta
- Order: Lepidoptera
- Family: Xyloryctidae
- Genus: Catoryctis
- Species: C. sciastis

Binomial name
- Catoryctis sciastis (Meyrick, 1915)

Synonyms
- Xylorycta sciastis Meyrick, 1915; Lichenaula sciastis Lower, 1896

Species of moth

Catoryctis sciastis is a moth in the family Xyloryctidae. It was described by Edward Meyrick in 1915. It is found in Australia, where it has been recorded from the Australian Capital Territory, New South Wales and Victoria.

The wingspan is about 32 mm. The forewings are light fuscous suffused with grey and irregularly sprinkled with whitish, with a few blackish scales and an undefined transverse bar of white irroration (sprinkles) beneath the middle of the disc. The veins towards the lower half of the termen are more distinctly suffused with white. The hindwings are whitish fuscous, more whitish towards the base, the apex and termen suffused with fuscous.
