= Catoryctis eugramma =

Scientific classification
- Kingdom: Animalia
- Phylum: Arthropoda
- Class: Insecta
- Order: Lepidoptera
- Family: Xyloryctidae
- Genus: Catoryctis
- Species: C. eugramma

Binomial name
- Catoryctis eugramma Meyrick, 1890

Species of moth

Catoryctis eugramma is a moth in the family Xyloryctidae. It was described by Edward Meyrick in 1890. It is found in Australia, where it has been recorded from New South Wales and Queensland.

The wingspan is 25–26 mm. The forewings are rather dark ochreous brown and the markings shining white. There is a moderate streak immediately beneath the costa from near the base to three-sixths, sometimes cut posteriorly by one or two longitudinal veins. A moderate streak, anteriorly attenuated, is found from the disc at one-third to the apex and there is a slightly narrower streak from the base along the submedian fold to the hind margin above the anal angle, but the posterior fourth reduced to two indistinct parallel lines. There is also a slender somewhat irregular streak from the inner margin near the base to the anal angle and a slender streak from the inner margin at one-fourth, running near the inner margin to beyond the middle. The hindwings are fuscous, paler towards the base, in males with a rather broad hind marginal band, narrowed towards the apex, of somewhat raised brownish-ochreous scales.

The larvae feed on Casuarina species. They bore into their host plant.
