= Catoryctis polysticha =

Scientific classification
- Domain: Eukaryota
- Kingdom: Animalia
- Phylum: Arthropoda
- Class: Insecta
- Order: Lepidoptera
- Family: Xyloryctidae
- Genus: Catoryctis
- Species: C. polysticha

Binomial name
- Catoryctis polysticha Lower, 1893

Species of moth

Catoryctis polysticha is a moth in the family Xyloryctidae. It was first described by Oswald Bertram Lower in 1893. It is found in Australia, where it has been recorded from South Australia.

The wingspan is about 26 mm. The forewings are slaty fuscous with white markings outlined with blackish. There is a moderate streak along the costa from the base to beyond two-thirds posteriorly strongly attenuated and leaving the extreme costal edge fuscous towards the base. A moderate streak is found from the base direct to the middle of the hindmargin, attenuated at the ends. There is a similar streak immediately beneath, from the base to the anal angle attenuated posteriorly. Three rather short fine lines are found towards the hindmargin, between the last two streaks and there is a slender line from three-fourths of the disc to the costa, before the apex and a similar but shorter streak beneath to the apex, as well as some obscure whitish scales along the inner margin indicating an unexpressed streak. The hindwings are grey, posteriorly fuscous tinged.
