= Catoryctis mediolinea =

Scientific classification
- Domain: Eukaryota
- Kingdom: Animalia
- Phylum: Arthropoda
- Class: Insecta
- Order: Lepidoptera
- Family: Xyloryctidae
- Genus: Catoryctis
- Species: C. mediolinea

Binomial name
- Catoryctis mediolinea T. P. Lucas, 1894

Species of moth

Catoryctis mediolinea is a moth in the family Xyloryctidae. It was described by Thomas Pennington Lucas in 1894. It is found in Australia, where it has been recorded from New South Wales and Queensland.

The wingspan is about 22 mm. The forewings are whitish ochreous with fuscous bands on the veins and a broad median snow-white band from the base narrowing sharply to a point at five-sixths. The hindwings are light ochreous.
