= Catoryctis tricrena =

Scientific classification
- Kingdom: Animalia
- Phylum: Arthropoda
- Class: Insecta
- Order: Lepidoptera
- Family: Xyloryctidae
- Genus: Catoryctis
- Species: C. tricrena

Binomial name
- Catoryctis tricrena Meyrick, 1890

Species of moth

Catoryctis tricrena is a moth in the family Xyloryctidae. It was described by Edward Meyrick in 1890. It is found in Australia, where it has been recorded from South Australia, Victoria and Western Australia.

The wingspan is 20–21 mm. The forewings are fuscous with a white streak from the base immediately beneath the costa, reaching the costa at one-fourth, and continued along it to two-thirds, finely attenuated. There are one or two short whitish lines between the veins towards the costa posteriorly and a moderate straight white longitudinal median streak from the base to the apex, the posterior fourth cut by a longitudinal fuscous line. Three short white longitudinal lines are found between the veins towards the hindmargin and there is an ill-defined narrow whitish straight longitudinal streak from the base of the inner margin direct to the anal angle, posteriorly confluent with a fine whitish line along the submedian fold. The hindwings are grey.

The larvae feed on Casuarina species.
