= Catoryctis subnexella =

Scientific classification
- Kingdom: Animalia
- Phylum: Arthropoda
- Class: Insecta
- Order: Lepidoptera
- Family: Xyloryctidae
- Genus: Catoryctis
- Species: C. subnexella

Binomial name
- Catoryctis subnexella (Walker, 1864)

Synonyms
- Oecophora subnexella Walker, 1864

Species of moth

Catoryctis subnexella is a moth in the family Xyloryctidae. It was described by Francis Walker in 1864. It is found in Australia, where it has been recorded from the Australian Capital Territory, New South Wales, South Australia and Tasmania.

The wingspan is 16–23 mm. The forewings are fuscous, more or less ochreous tinged and with a white attenuated streak immediately beneath the costa, from the base to the middle. All veins tend to be marked posteriorly with whitish streaks, but generally very indistinct. There is a moderate straight silvery-white longitudinal median streak from the base to the apex, interrupted by a very oblique line of ground colour before the middle, the lower edge emitting one or two short very oblique teeth on the veins posteriorly. Sometimes, there is a small darker spot on the lower margin of this at two-thirds and a slender whitish longitudinal streak from the inner margin at one-fourth to beyond the middle, often almost entirely obsolete. The hindwings fuscous or grey, becoming lighter and sometimes ochreous-tinged towards the base.

The larvae feed on Casuarina species.
