= Catoryctis perichalca =

Scientific classification
- Kingdom: Animalia
- Phylum: Arthropoda
- Clade: Pancrustacea
- Class: Insecta
- Order: Lepidoptera
- Family: Xyloryctidae
- Genus: Catoryctis
- Species: C. perichalca

Binomial name
- Catoryctis perichalca Lower, 1923

Species of moth

Catoryctis perichalca is a moth in the family Xyloryctidae. It was described by Oswald Bertram Lower in 1923. It is found in Australia, where it has been recorded from South Australia.

The wingspan is 25–27 mm. The forewings are bright ochreous fuscous, with silvery-white markings. There is a narrow subcostal streak from near the base to the middle, touching the costa on the anterior end and becoming attenuated posteriorly. Two very fine short streaks, somewhat obscure, are found between the posterior extremity of the subcostal streak and the costa at four-fifths, both touching the costa. There is also a broad, clear, longitudinal streak, from the base to just above the middle of the termen, the posterior half somewhat attenuated. A similar streak is found from the base along the dorsum to one-sixth, then continued above the dorsum to the termen above the tornus, attenuated at the base. The hindwings are fuscous.
