= Catoryctis subparallela =

Scientific classification
- Kingdom: Animalia
- Phylum: Arthropoda
- Class: Insecta
- Order: Lepidoptera
- Family: Xyloryctidae
- Genus: Catoryctis
- Species: C. subparallela

Binomial name
- Catoryctis subparallela (Walker, 1864)

Synonyms
- Oecophora subparallela Walker, 1864; Oecophora nexella Walker, 1864; Oecophora fissulella Walker, 1864

Species of moth

Catoryctis subparallela is a moth in the family Xyloryctidae. It was described by Francis Walker in 1864. It is found in Australia, where it has been recorded from New South Wales, Queensland and South Australia.

The wingspan is 17–21 mm. The forewings are brownish ochreous, golden tinged with a slender silvery-white attenuated streak immediately beneath the costa from near the base to beyond the middle and a whitish line from beneath this at one-third to the costa at three-fourths, and another from beneath this beyond the middle to the costa before the apex. There is a moderately broad straight entire silvery-white longitudinal median streak from the base to the apex and a similar narrower parallel streak from the inner margin at one-third to the hind margin below the middle. The hindwings are whitish ochreous, with the anal angle yellow ochreous.

The larvae feed on Casuarina species. They create tubular shelters between the branches of their host plant.
