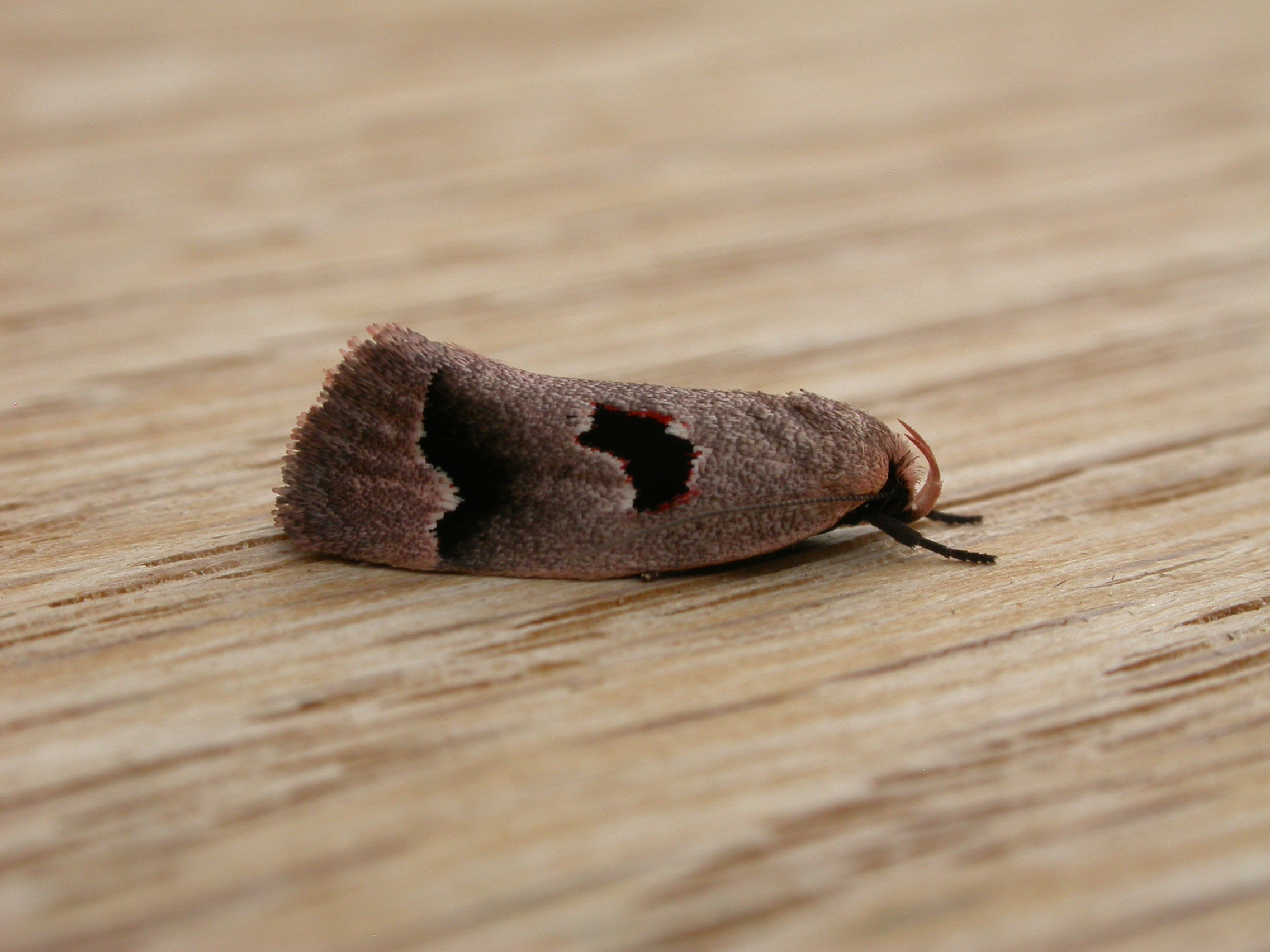

Scientific classification
- Kingdom: Animalia
- Phylum: Arthropoda
- Class: Insecta
- Order: Lepidoptera
- Family: Oecophoridae
- Genus: Acanthodela
- Species: A. erythrosema

Binomial name
- Acanthodela erythrosema (Meyrick, 1886)

Synonyms
- Zonopetala erythrosema Meyrick, 1886

= Acanthodela erythrosema =

Species of moth

Acanthodela erythrosema is a species of moth of the family Oecophoridae. It is known from the Australian Capital Territory, New South Wales, Queensland, South Australia, Tasmania and Victoria.

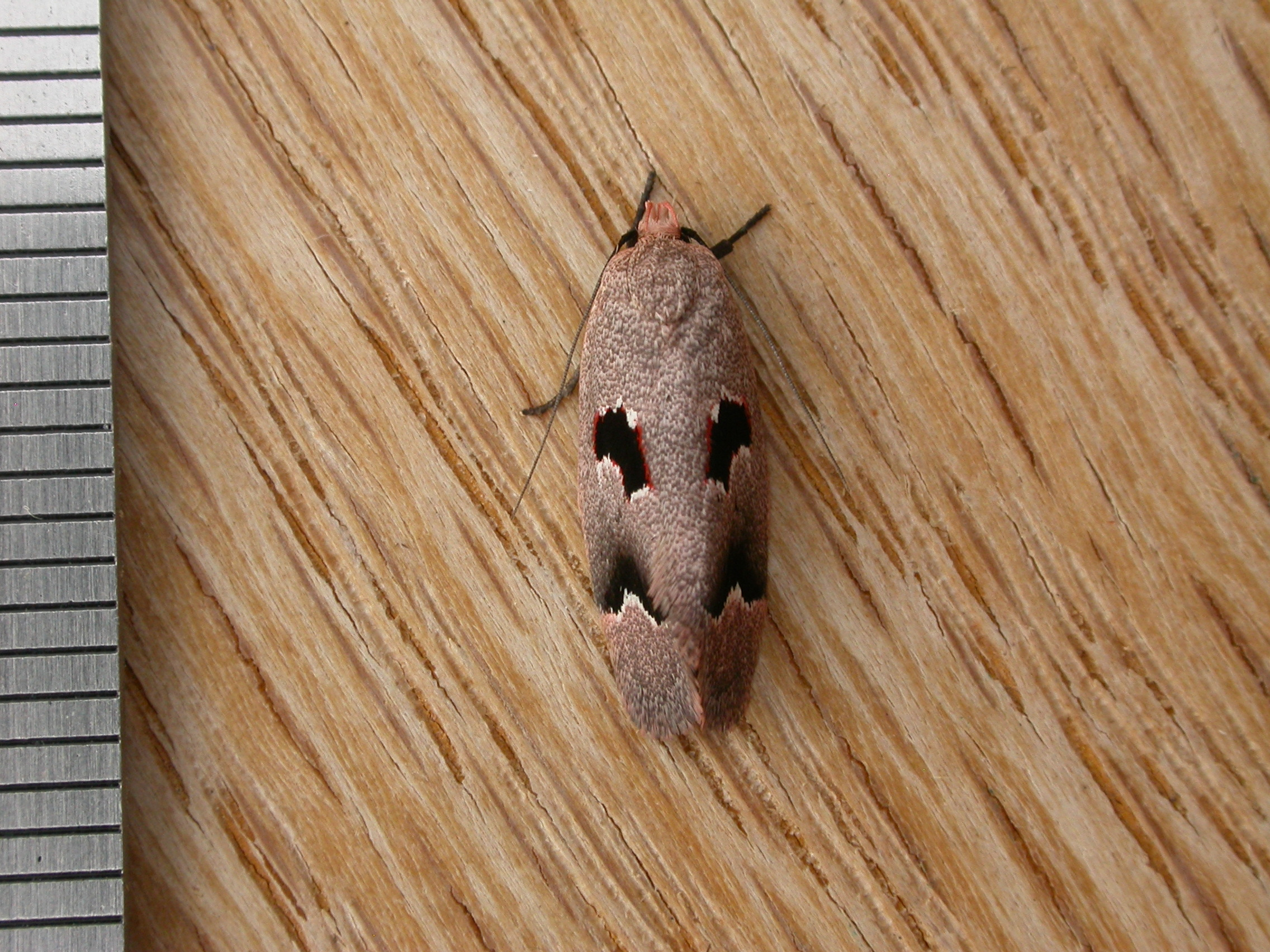

The larvae have feed on the dead leaves of Eucalyptus species. They live in flat, oval case in dead leaves.
