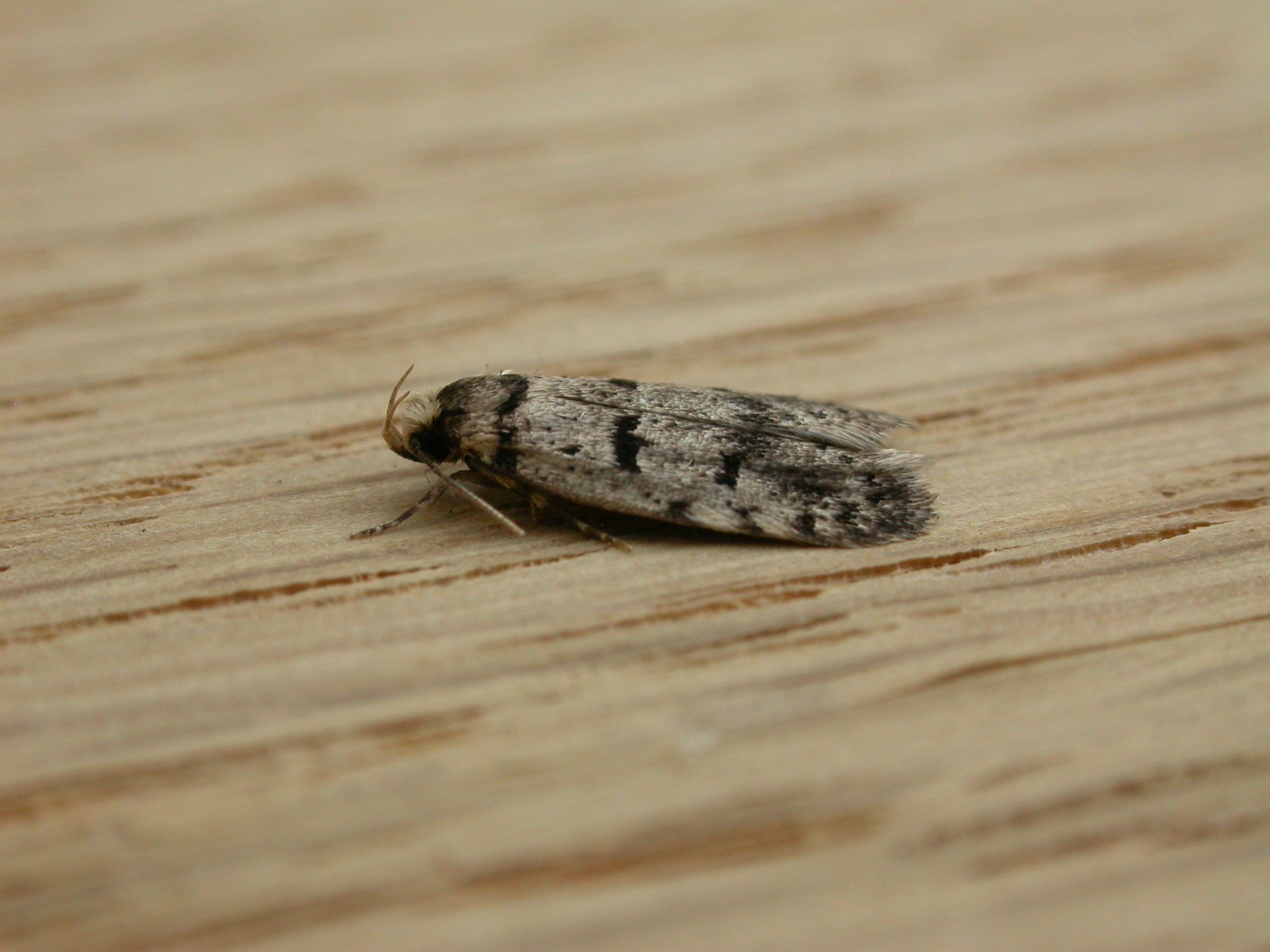

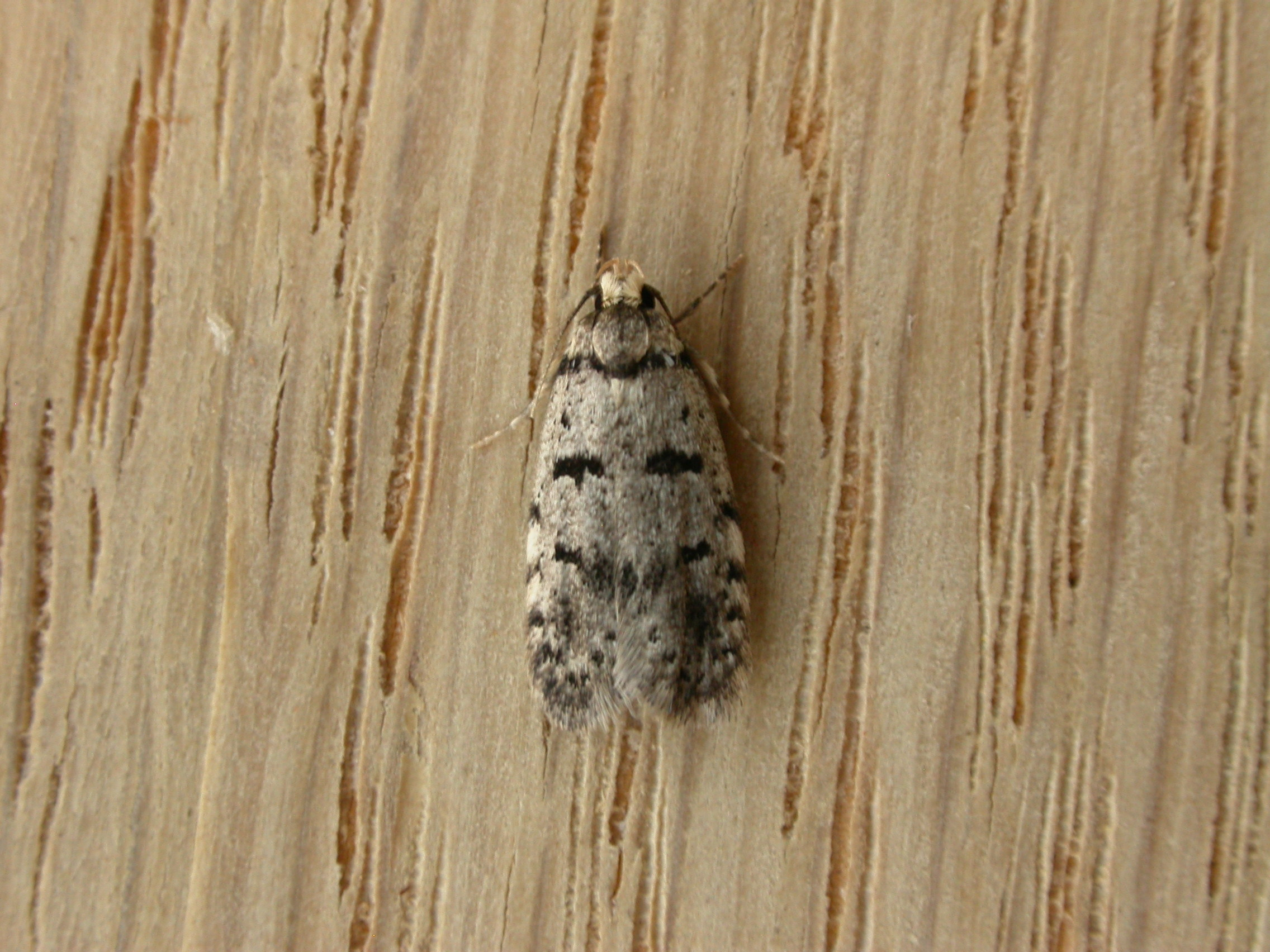

Scientific classification
- Kingdom: Animalia
- Phylum: Arthropoda
- Clade: Pancrustacea
- Class: Insecta
- Order: Lepidoptera
- Family: Oecophoridae
- Genus: Scatochresis
- Species: S. episema

Binomial name
- Scatochresis episema (Meyrick, 1883)

Synonyms
- Eulechria episema Meyrick, 1883

= Scatochresis episema =

Moth species native to Australia

Scatochresis episema is a moth of the family Oecophoridae. It is known from New South Wales, Queensland, South Australia, Tasmania and Victoria.

The larvae feed on the mammal scat of Phascolarctos cinereus.
