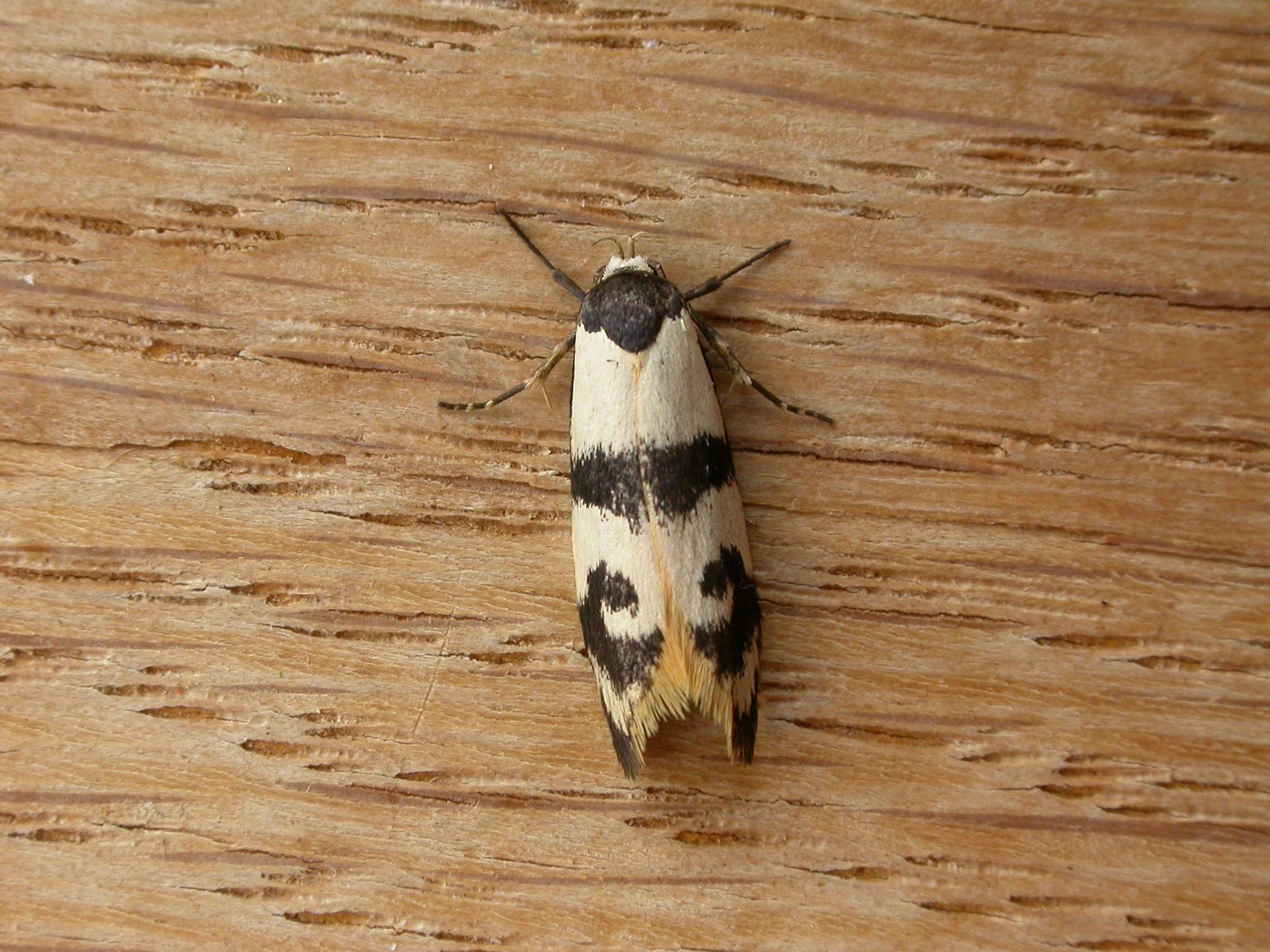

Scientific classification
- Kingdom: Animalia
- Phylum: Arthropoda
- Class: Insecta
- Order: Lepidoptera
- Family: Oecophoridae
- Genus: Cosmaresta
- Species: C. eugramma

Binomial name
- Cosmaresta eugramma (Lower, 1894)

Synonyms
- Peltophora eugramma Lower, 1894

= Cosmaresta eugramma =

Species of moth

Cosmaresta eugramma is a species of moth of the family Oecophoridae. It is known from the Australian Capital Territory, New South Wales and Victoria.

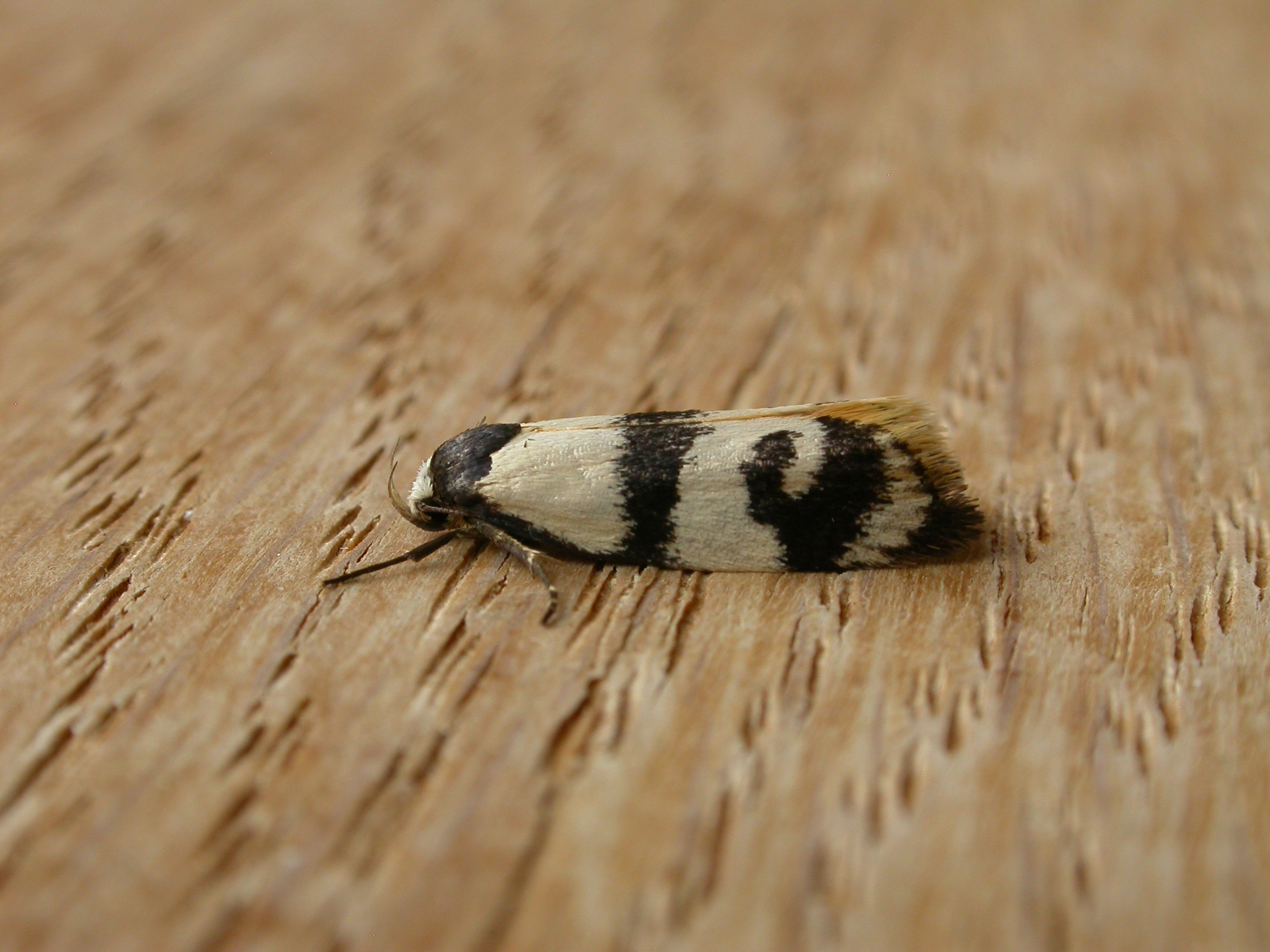
