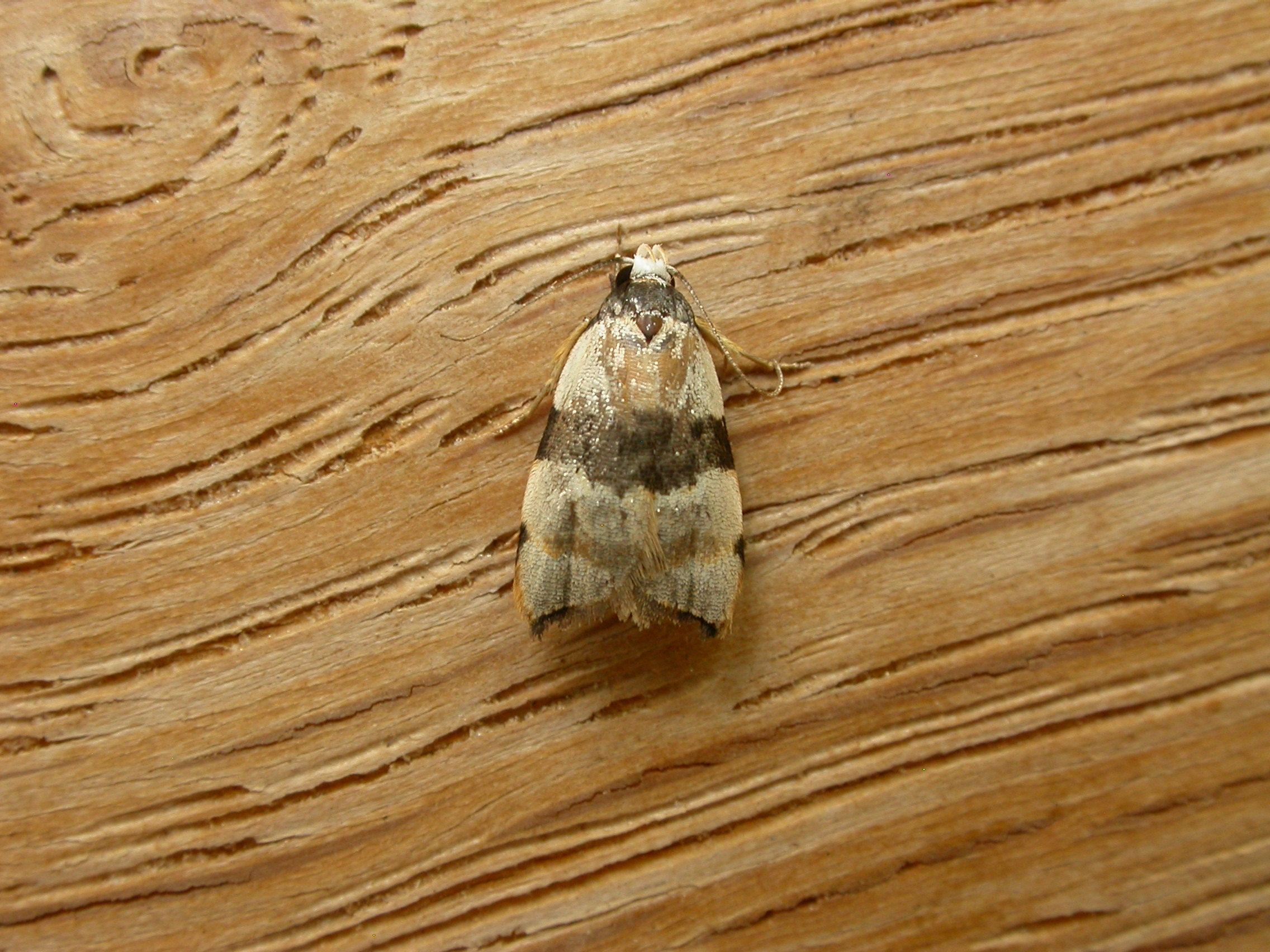

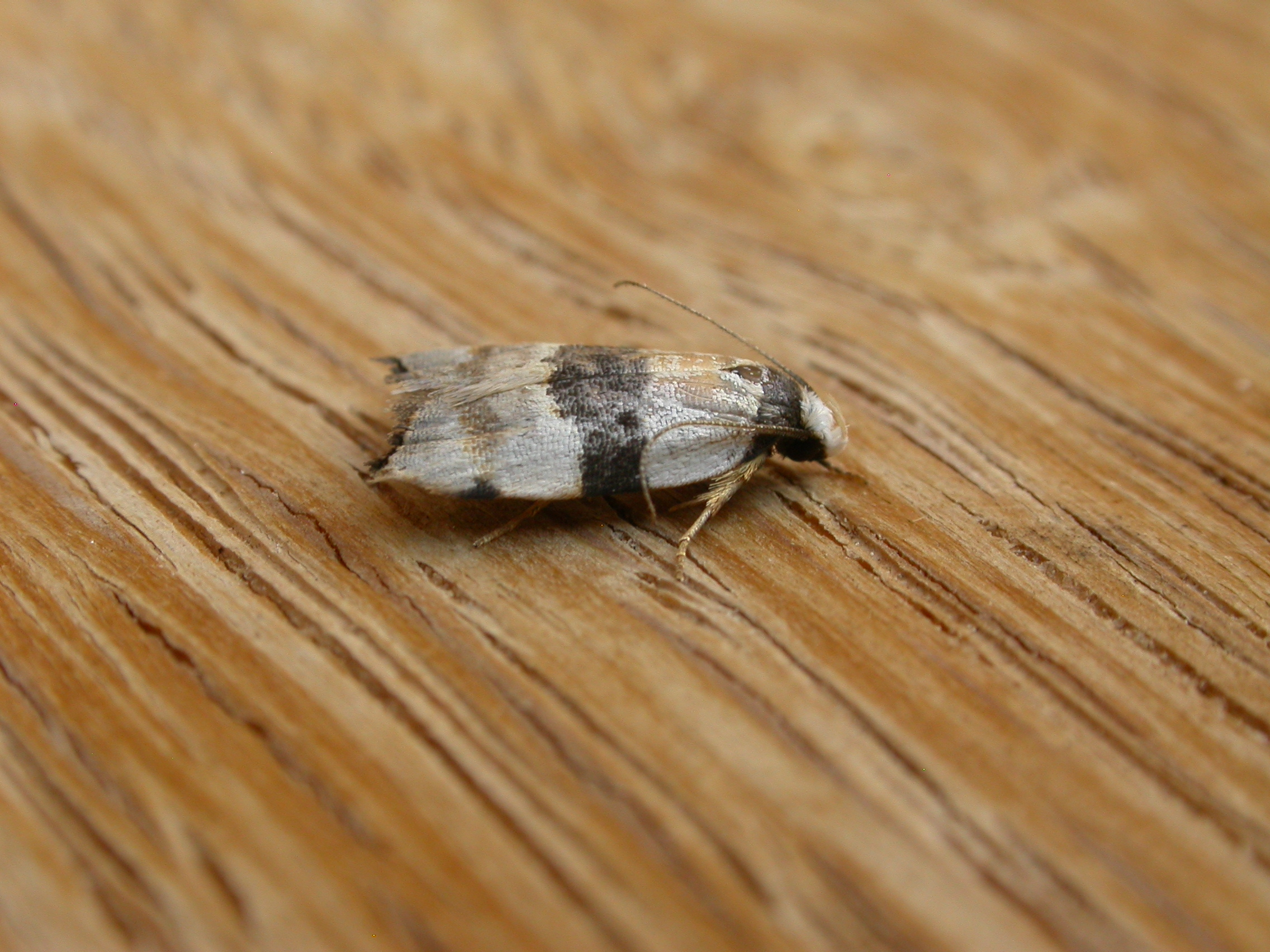

Scientific classification
- Kingdom: Animalia
- Phylum: Arthropoda
- Class: Insecta
- Order: Lepidoptera
- Family: Oecophoridae
- Genus: Zonopetala
- Species: Z. glauconephela

Binomial name
- Zonopetala glauconephela Meyrick, 1883

= Zonopetala glauconephela =

Species of moth

Zonopetala glauconephela is a moth of the family Oecophoridae. It is known from New South Wales and Queensland.
