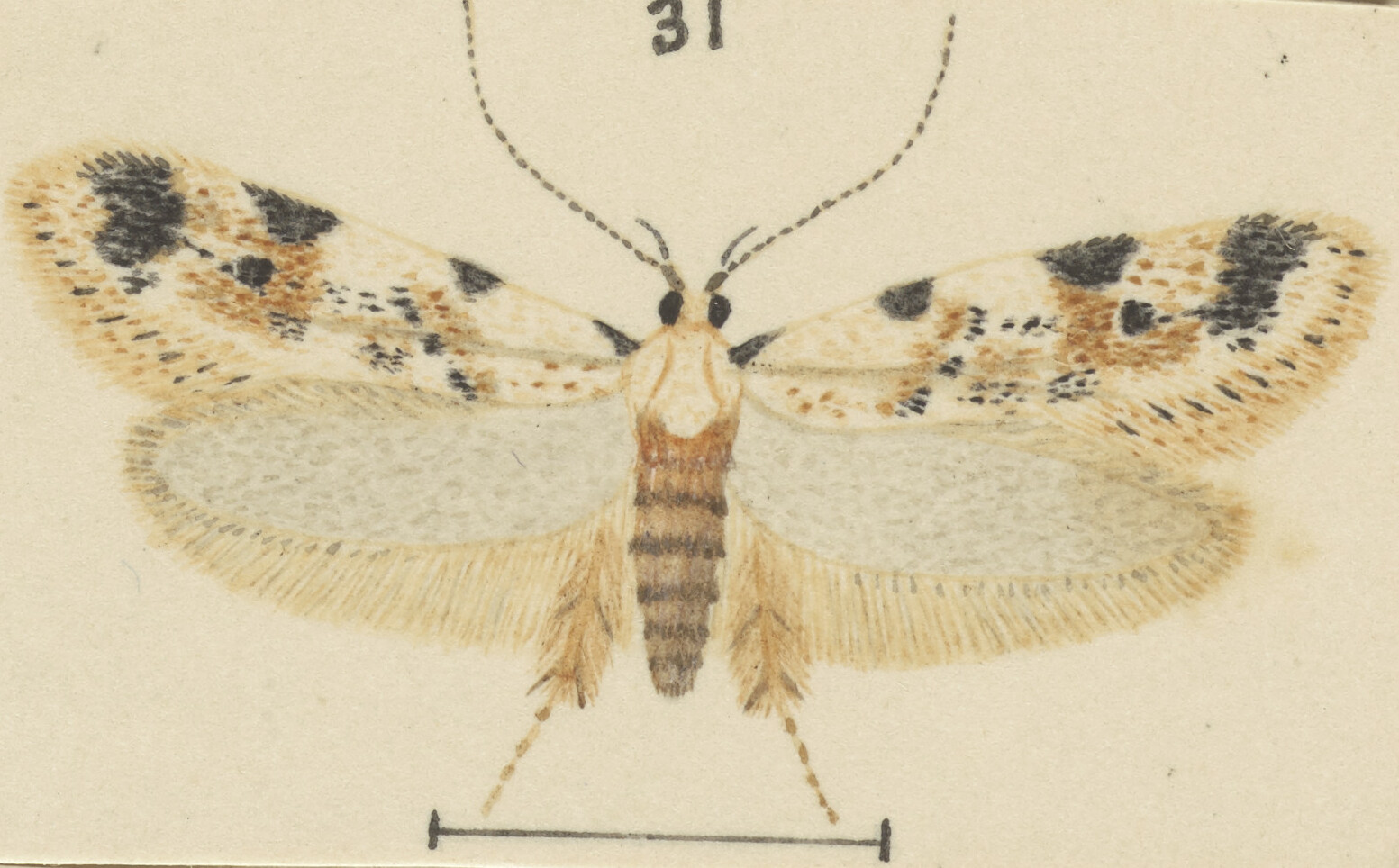

Scientific classification
- Kingdom: Animalia
- Phylum: Arthropoda
- Clade: Pancrustacea
- Class: Insecta
- Order: Lepidoptera
- Family: Oecophoridae
- Genus: Opsitycha
- Species: O. squalidella

Binomial name
- Opsitycha squalidella (Meyrick, 1884)

Synonyms
- Philobota squalidella Meyrick, 1884; Borkhausenia morella Hudson, 1939

= Opsitycha squalidella =

Species of moth

Opsitycha squalidella is a moth of the family Oecophoridae. It was described by Edward Meyrick in 1884. This species is native to Australia and is likely adventive to New Zealand.

== Taxonomy ==
This species was first described by Edward Meyrick in 1884 using several specimens collected in Melbourne and Hobart in December and named Philobota squalidella. In 1939 George Hudson, thinking he was describing a new species, named it Borkhausenia morella. In 2018 the species Borkhausenia morella was synonymised with O. squalidella.

== Description ==
Meyrick described this species as follows:

♂. 14-17 mm. Head ochreous- white. Palpi white, externally irrorated with blackish. Antennae whitish-fuscous. Thorax ochreous-white, mixed with pale ochreous. Abdomen ochreous-whitish. Legs dark fuscous, ringed with ochreous-white, posterior tibiae ochreous- whitish. Fore wings elongate, narrow, costa slightly arched, apex round-pointed, hindmargin extremely obliquely rounded; ochreous-white, irregularly mixed and suffused with light ochreous, and with a few blackish scales; a small blackish spot at base of costa, another at 1/4, and a larger triangular spot in middle of costa; a black dot in disc at 1/3, a second obliquely before it on fold, a third in disc at 2/3, and a fourth on inner margin before anal angle; an irregular blackish fascia-like blotch from costa before apex to middle of hindmargin : cilia whitish-ochreous, finely irrorated with grey, basal half narrowly barred with blackish. Hind wings grey, base paler; cilia whitish, irrorated with grey.

== Distribution ==
This species is native to Australia and likely adventive to New Zealand. In Australia this species is found in central and southern New South Wales, Australian Capital Territory, Victoria, Tasmania, South Australia and southwestern Western Australia. In New Zealand this species was first recorded in Auckland on or prior to 1939 and has also been observed in Napier. It is regarded as being established in New Zealand but is scarce and local.

== Hosts ==
Although the life history of this species is not known it has been hypothesised that the larvae of O. squalidella feed on leaf litter.

== Behaviour ==
In New Zealand adults are on the wing from October to December. The adults of this species are attracted to light.
