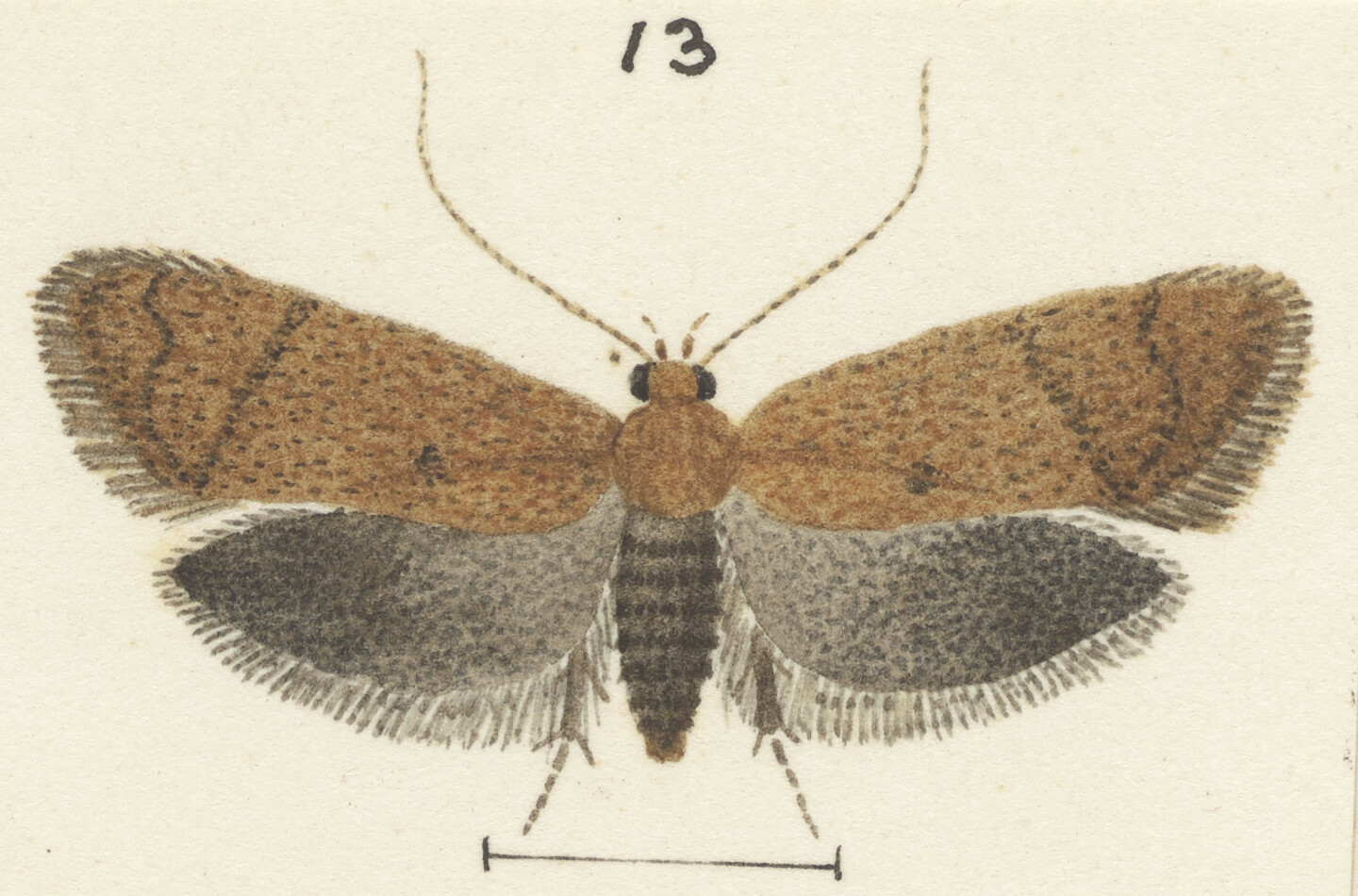

Scientific classification
- Kingdom: Animalia
- Phylum: Arthropoda
- Clade: Pancrustacea
- Class: Insecta
- Order: Lepidoptera
- Family: Oecophoridae
- Genus: Mermeristis
- Species: M. spodiaea

Binomial name
- Mermeristis spodiaea Meyrick, 1915

= Mermeristis spodiaea =

Species of moth

Mermeristis spodiaea is a moth of the family Oecophoridae. It was first described by Edward Meyrick in 1915. It is found in Tasmania, Australia and New Zealand.

== Taxonomy ==
This species was first described by Edward Meyrick in 1915.

== Description ==
Meyrick described the male of this species as follows:

♂. 12 mm. Head and palpi brownish. Antennal ciliations 3. Thorax fuscous. Abdomen grey. Forewings elongate, costa slightly arched, apex obtuse-pointed, termen very obliquely rounded; fuscous; stigmata obscure, dark grey, plical rather obliquely beyond first discal, an obscure ochreous-whitish dot beneath second discal : cilia light fuscous. Hindwings rather dark grey; cilia light grey, with darker subbasal shade.
