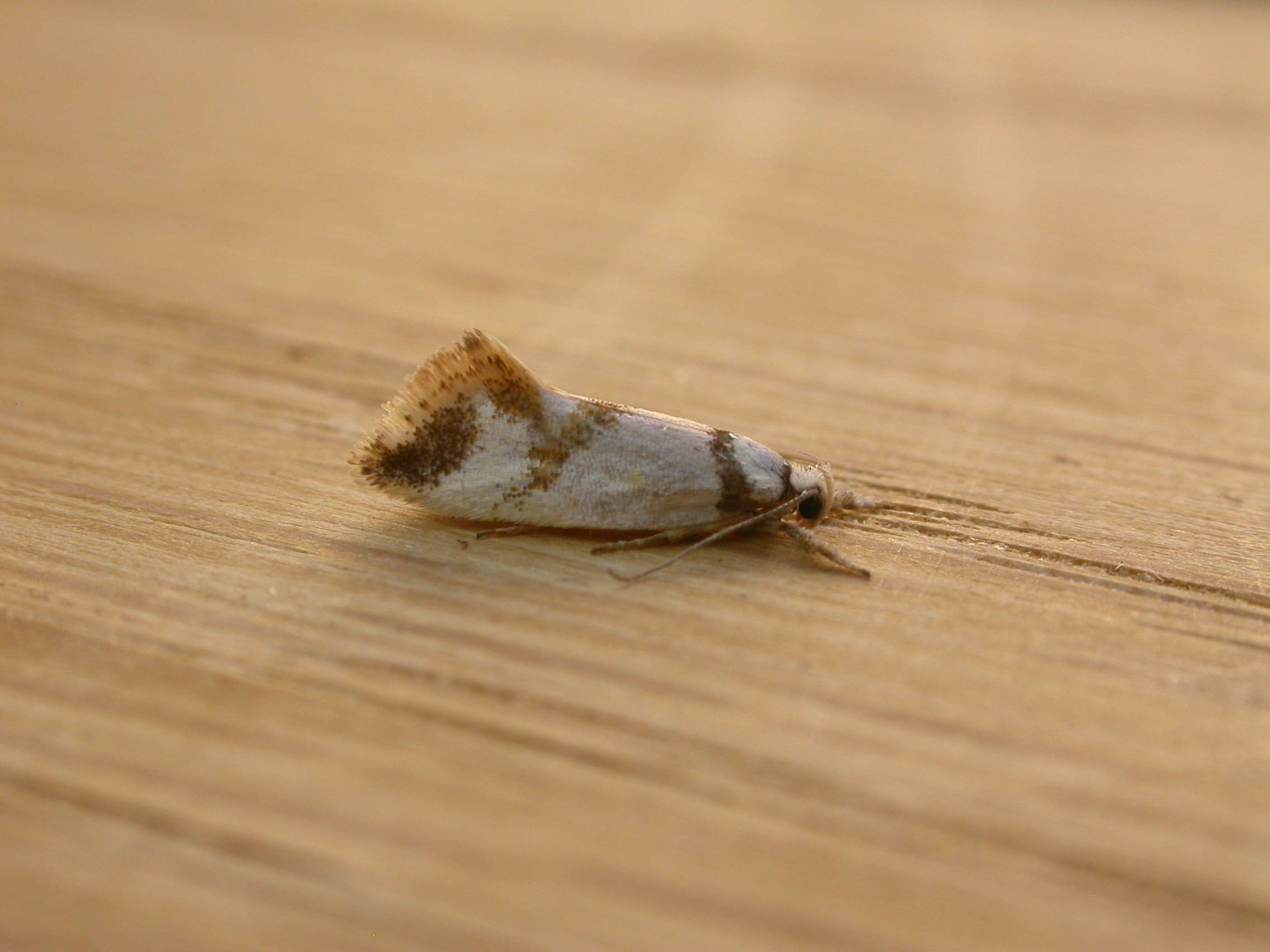

Scientific classification
- Kingdom: Animalia
- Phylum: Arthropoda
- Clade: Pancrustacea
- Class: Insecta
- Order: Lepidoptera
- Family: Oecophoridae
- Genus: Lepidotarsa
- Species: L. habrodelta

Binomial name
- Lepidotarsa habrodelta (Lower, 1897)

Synonyms
- Compsotropha habrodelta Lower, 1897

= Lepidotarsa habrodelta =

Species of moth

Lepidotarsa habrodelta is a moth of the family Oecophoridae. It is found in New South Wales, South Australia and Victoria. This moth has white forewings each with a black stripe across the base, a dark brown margin, and an often incomplete brown or yellow 'X' across the middle of the wing The hindwings are off-white shading to brown at the margins. The wingspan is about 2 cm.
