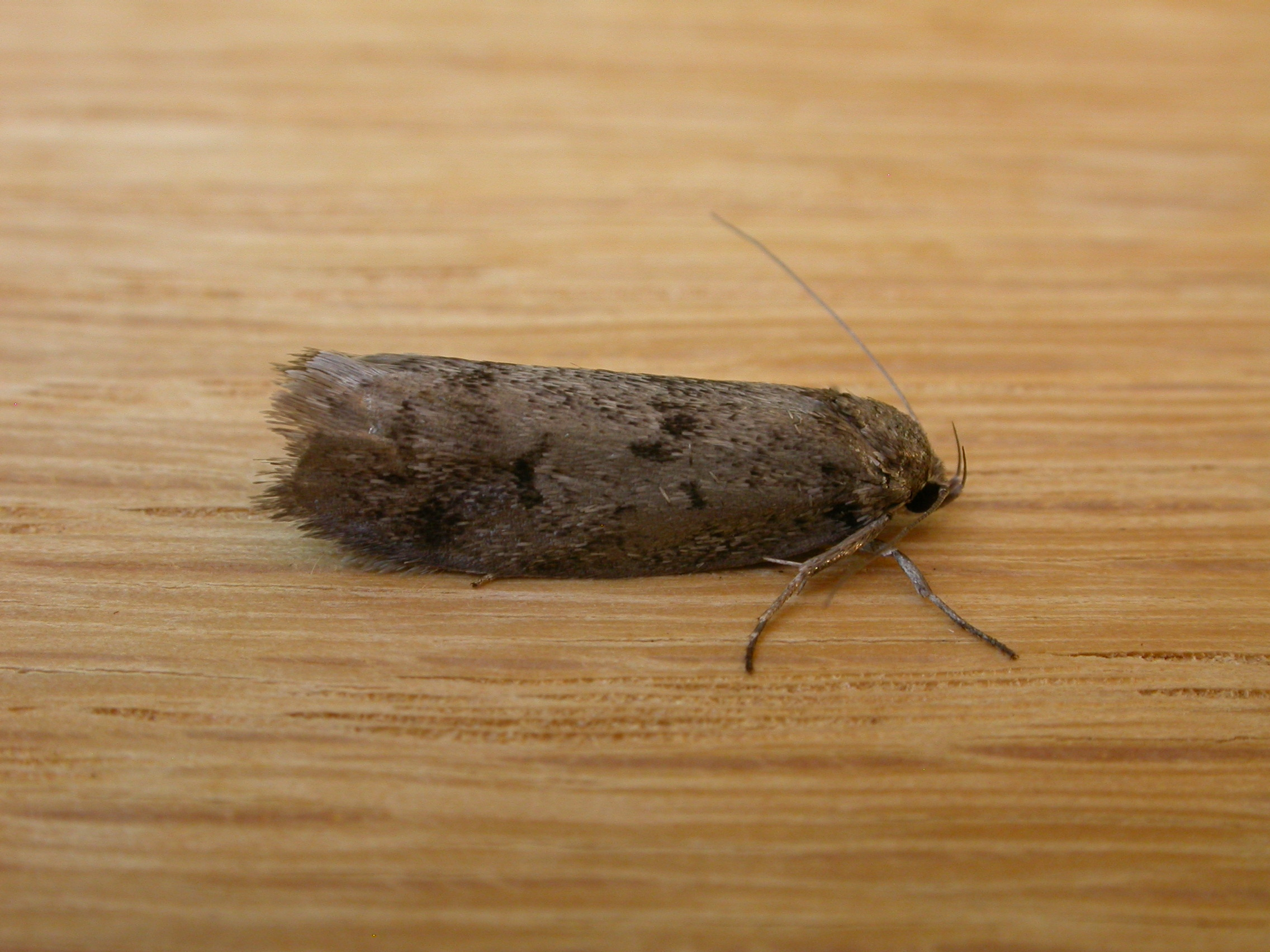

Scientific classification
- Kingdom: Animalia
- Phylum: Arthropoda
- Clade: Pancrustacea
- Class: Insecta
- Order: Lepidoptera
- Family: Oecophoridae
- Genus: Ericrypsina
- Species: E. chorodoxa

Binomial name
- Ericrypsina chorodoxa (Meyrick, 1920)

Synonyms
- Eulechria chorodoxa Meyrick, 1920; Eulechria ochrocneca Turner, 1938; Philobota xesta Turner, 1944

= Ericrypsina chorodoxa =

Species of moth

Ericrypsina chorodoxa is a moth of the family Oecophoridae. It is known from New South Wales, Queensland and Victoria.
