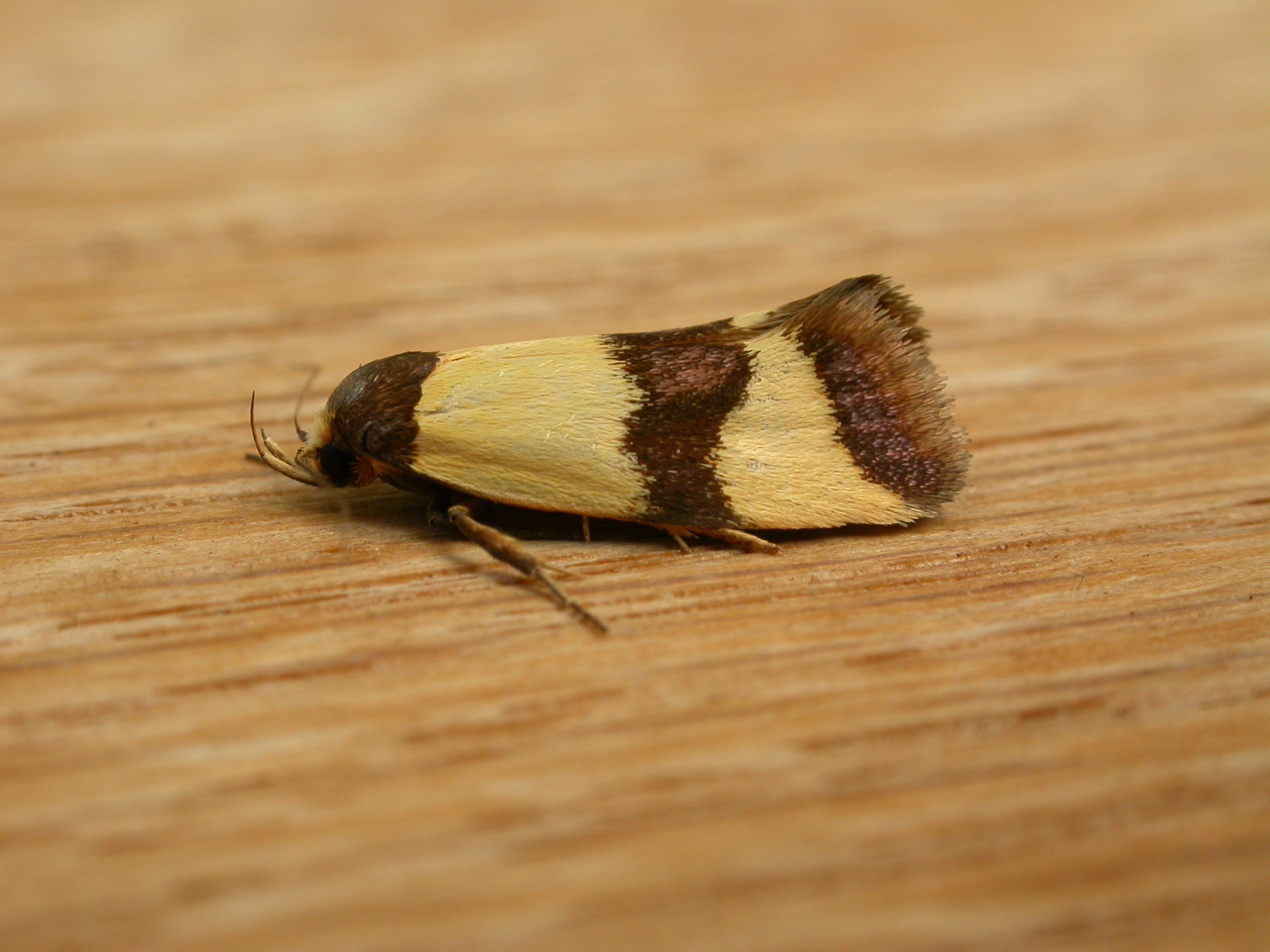

Scientific classification
- Kingdom: Animalia
- Phylum: Arthropoda
- Clade: Pancrustacea
- Class: Insecta
- Order: Lepidoptera
- Family: Oecophoridae
- Genus: Chrysonoma
- Species: C. fascialis

Binomial name
- Chrysonoma fascialis (Fabricius, 1775)

Synonyms
- Phalaena fascialis Fabricius, 1775; Tortrix bimaculana Donovan, 1805; Oecophora bimaculella Newman, 1856

= Chrysonoma fascialis =

Species of moth

Chrysonoma fascialis is a moth of the family Oecophoridae. It is known from Australia and Papua New Guinea.
