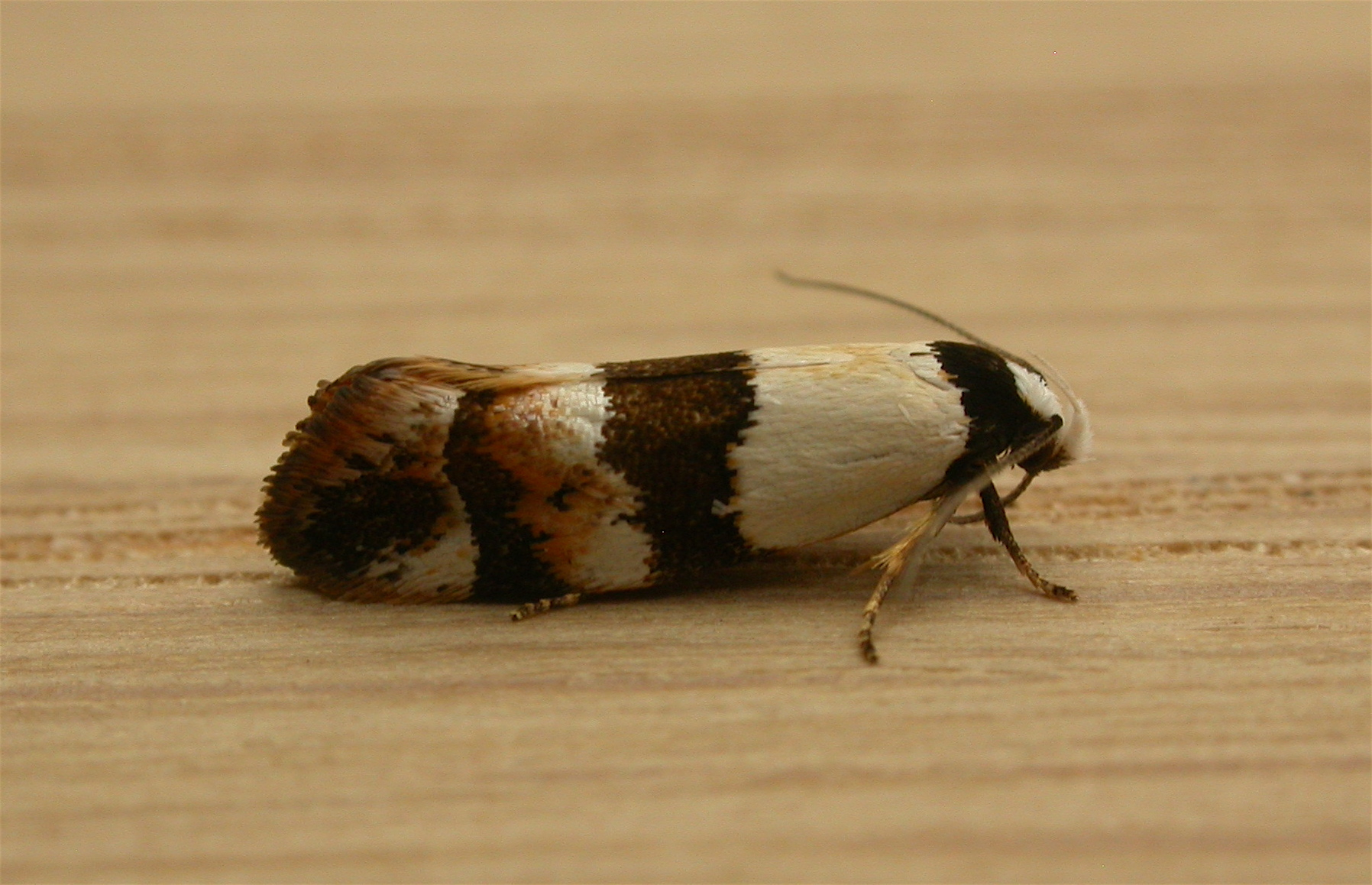

Scientific classification
- Kingdom: Animalia
- Phylum: Arthropoda
- Class: Insecta
- Order: Lepidoptera
- Family: Oecophoridae
- Genus: Zonopetala
- Species: Z. decisana

Binomial name
- Zonopetala decisana Walker, 1863

Synonyms
- Conchylis decisana Walker, 1863; Oecophora ustella Walker, 1864; Oecophora mediella Walker, 1864; Zonopetala didymosticha Turner, 1946

= Zonopetala decisana =

Species of moth

Zonopetala decisana is a moth of the family Oecophoridae. It is found in Australia.
