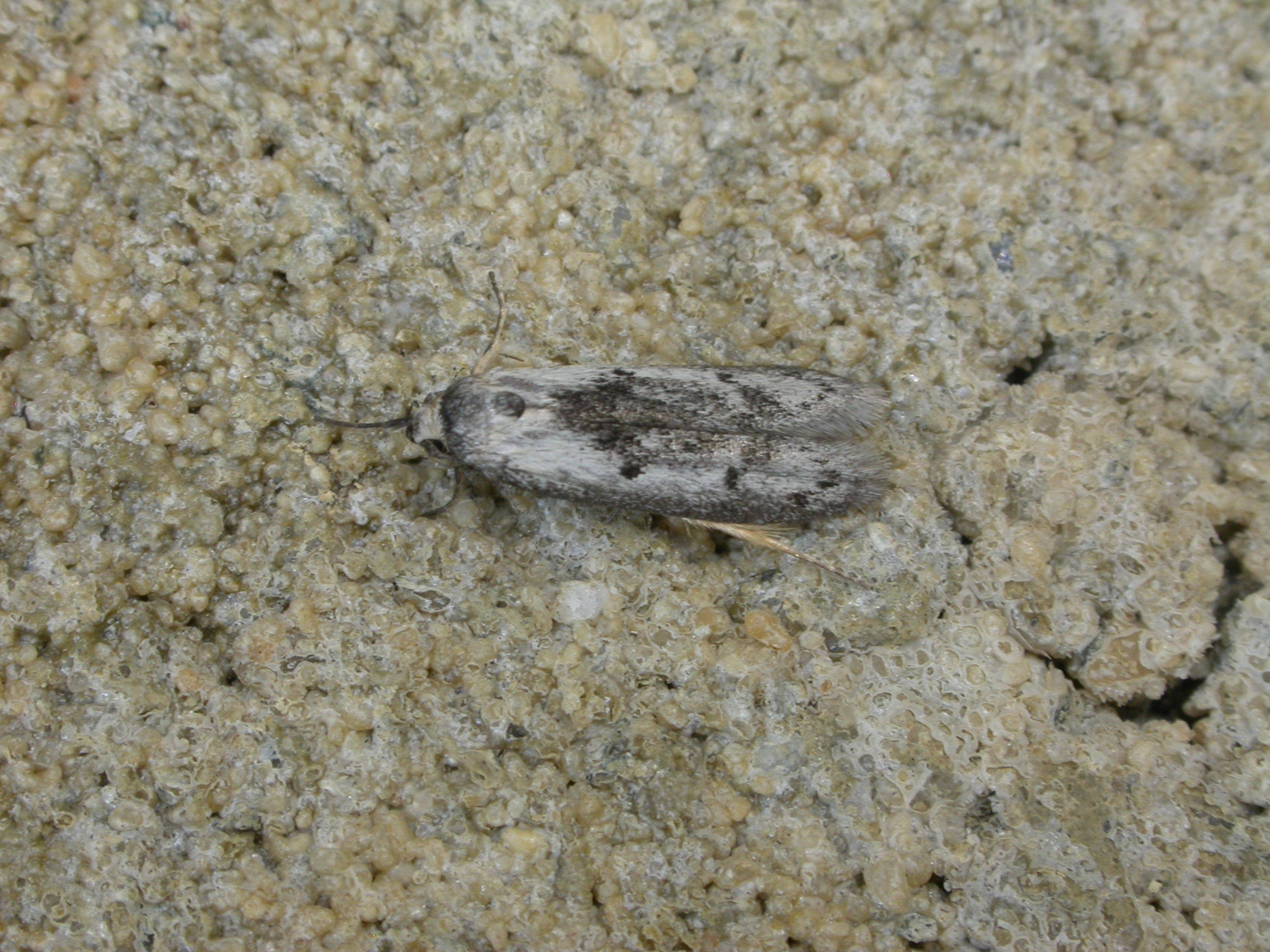

Scientific classification
- Kingdom: Animalia
- Phylum: Arthropoda
- Clade: Pancrustacea
- Class: Insecta
- Order: Lepidoptera
- Family: Oecophoridae
- Genus: Conobrosis
- Species: C. acervata

Binomial name
- Conobrosis acervata (Meyrick, 1814)

Synonyms
- Eulechria acervata Meyrick, 1914; Borkhausenia gypsodes Turner, 1933

= Conobrosis acervata =

Species of moth

Conobrosis acervata (previously Euchaetis acervata) is a moth of the family Oecophoridae. It is found in Australia.
