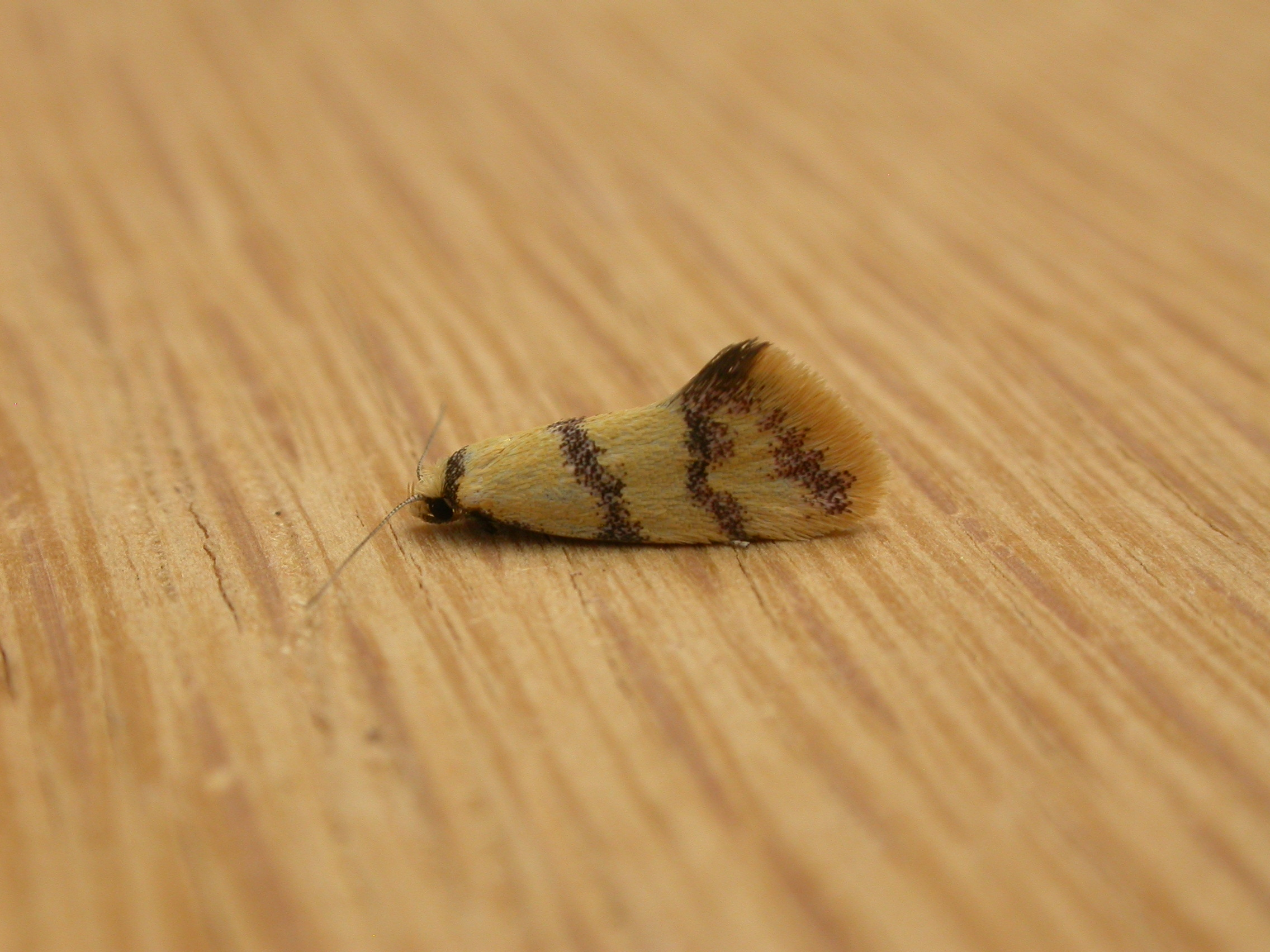

Scientific classification
- Kingdom: Animalia
- Phylum: Arthropoda
- Clade: Pancrustacea
- Class: Insecta
- Order: Lepidoptera
- Family: Oecophoridae
- Genus: Psaroxantha
- Species: P. basilica

Binomial name
- Psaroxantha basilica (Meyrick, 1884)

Synonyms
- Coesyra basilica Meyrick, 1884; Coesyra phricomita Turner, 1940

= Psaroxantha basilica =

Species of moth

Psaroxantha basilica is a moth of the family Oecophoridae. It is known from New South Wales and Queensland.
