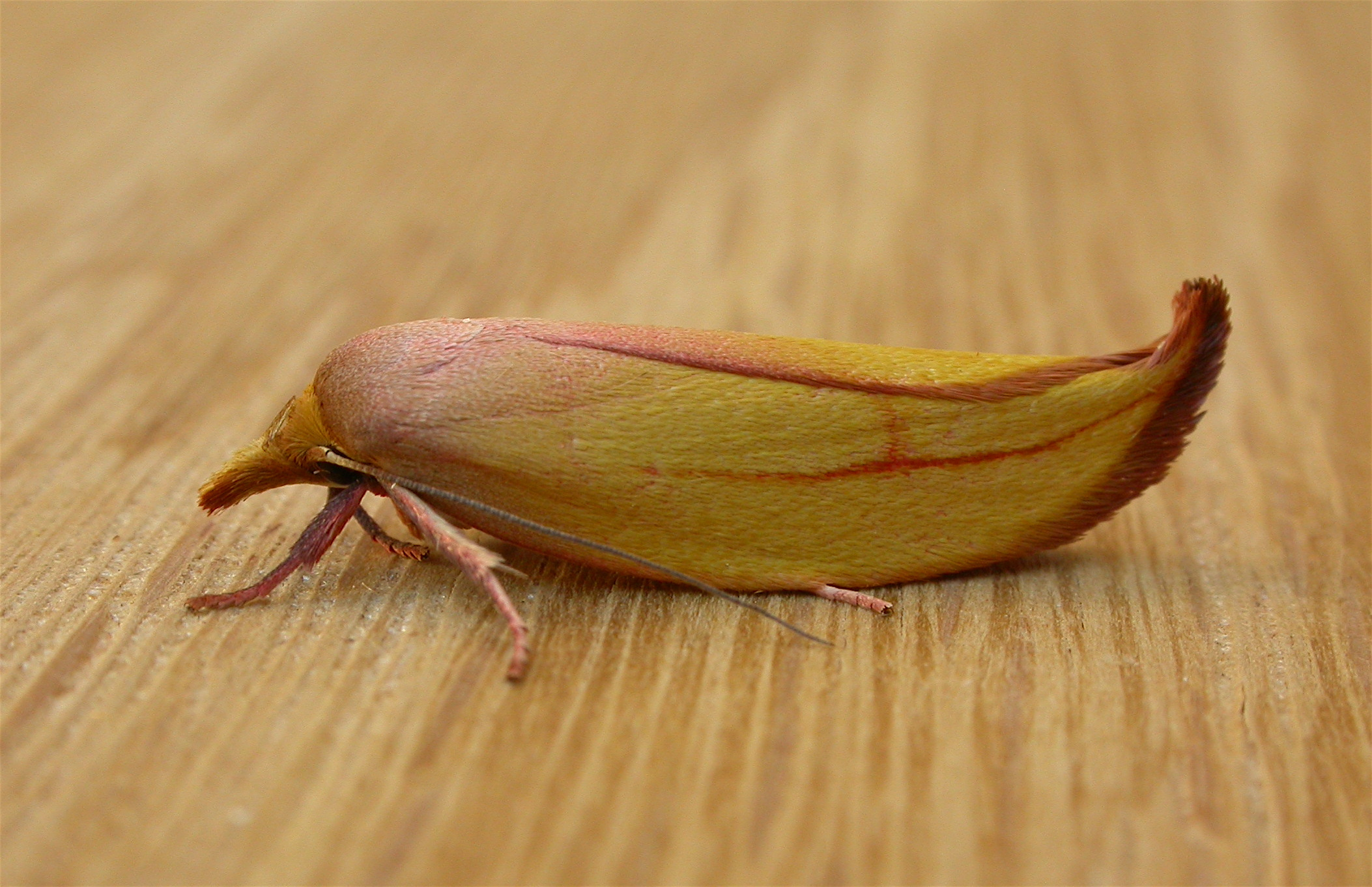

Scientific classification
- Kingdom: Animalia
- Phylum: Arthropoda
- Clade: Pancrustacea
- Class: Insecta
- Order: Lepidoptera
- Family: Oecophoridae
- Genus: Wingia
- Species: W. aurata

Binomial name
- Wingia aurata Walker, 1864

= Wingia aurata =

Species of moth

Wingia aurata, the golden leaf moth, is a moth of the family Oecophoridae. It is found in Southern and Eastern Australia.

The wingspan is 30–35 mm.
