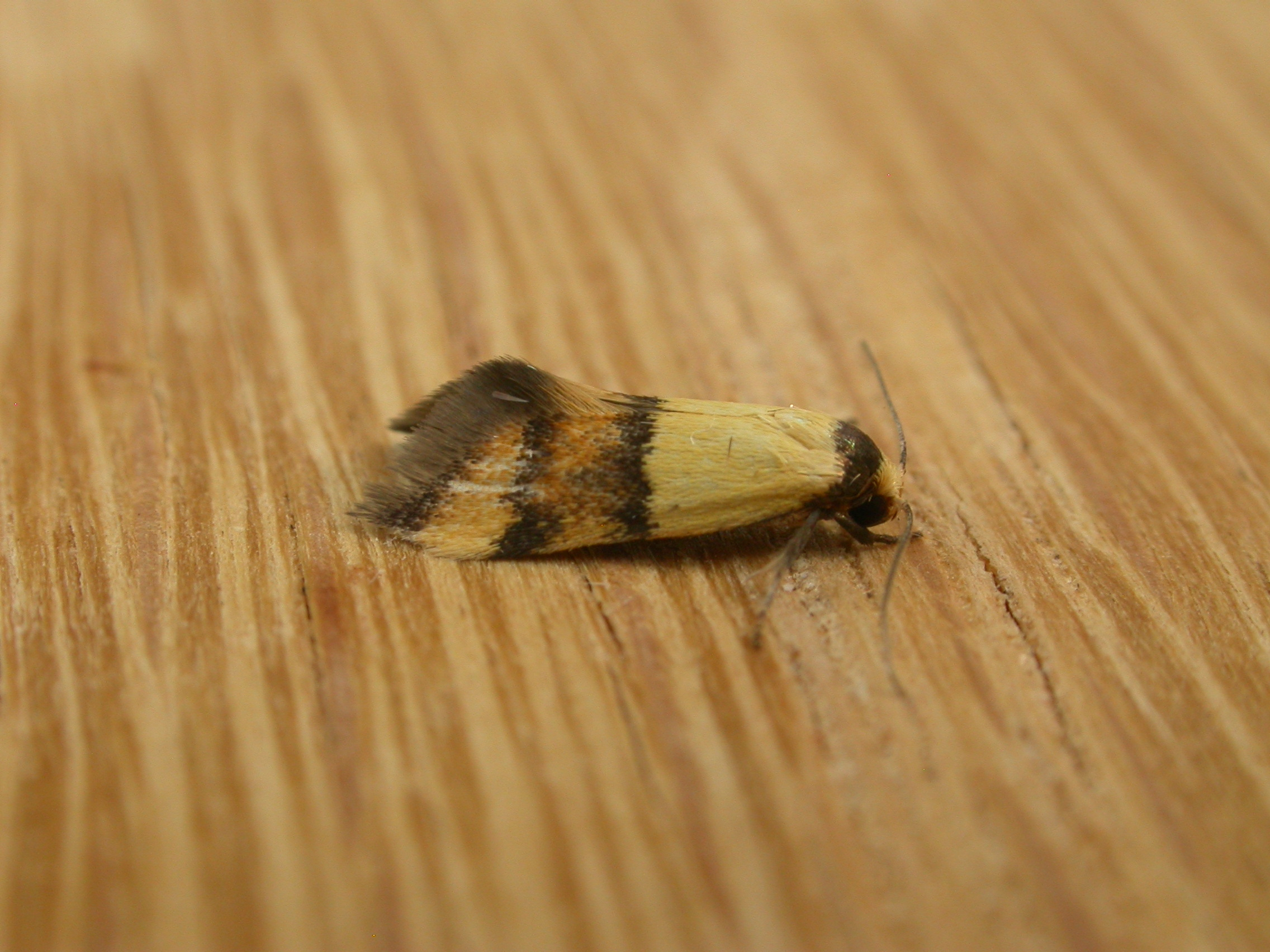

Scientific classification
- Kingdom: Animalia
- Phylum: Arthropoda
- Clade: Pancrustacea
- Class: Insecta
- Order: Lepidoptera
- Family: Oecophoridae
- Genus: Temnogyropa
- Species: T. stenomorpha

Binomial name
- Temnogyropa stenomorpha Turner, 1940

= Temnogyropa stenomorpha =

Species of moth

Temnogyropa stenomorpha is a moth of the family Oecophoridae. It is found in Australia.
