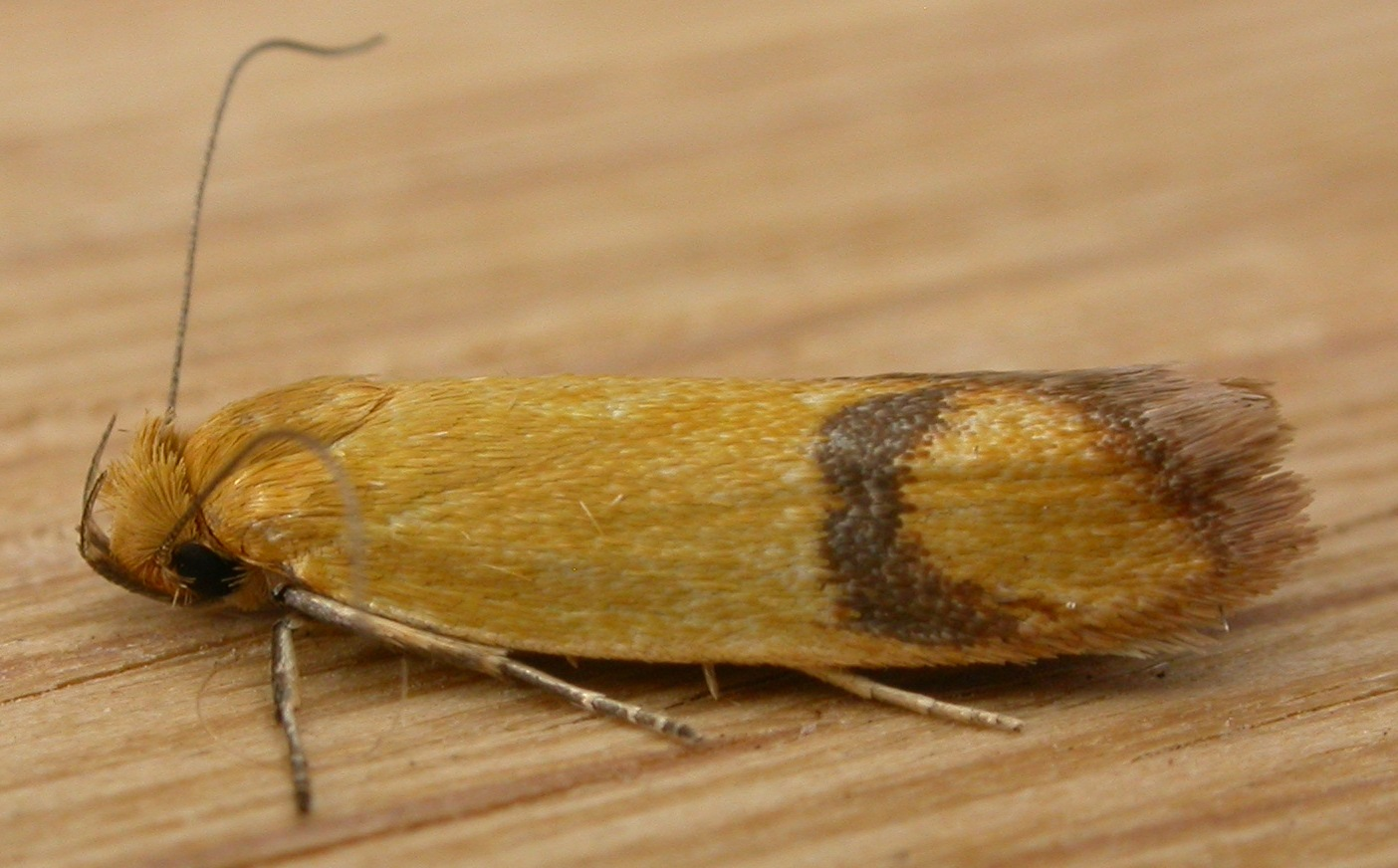

Scientific classification
- Kingdom: Animalia
- Phylum: Arthropoda
- Clade: Pancrustacea
- Class: Insecta
- Order: Lepidoptera
- Family: Oecophoridae
- Genus: Plectobela
- Species: P. zanclotoma

Binomial name
- Plectobela zanclotoma Meyrick, 1884

= Plectobela zanclotoma =

Species of moth

Plectobela zanclotoma is a moth of the family Oecophoridae. It is found in Australia.

The wingspan is 30–35 mm.
