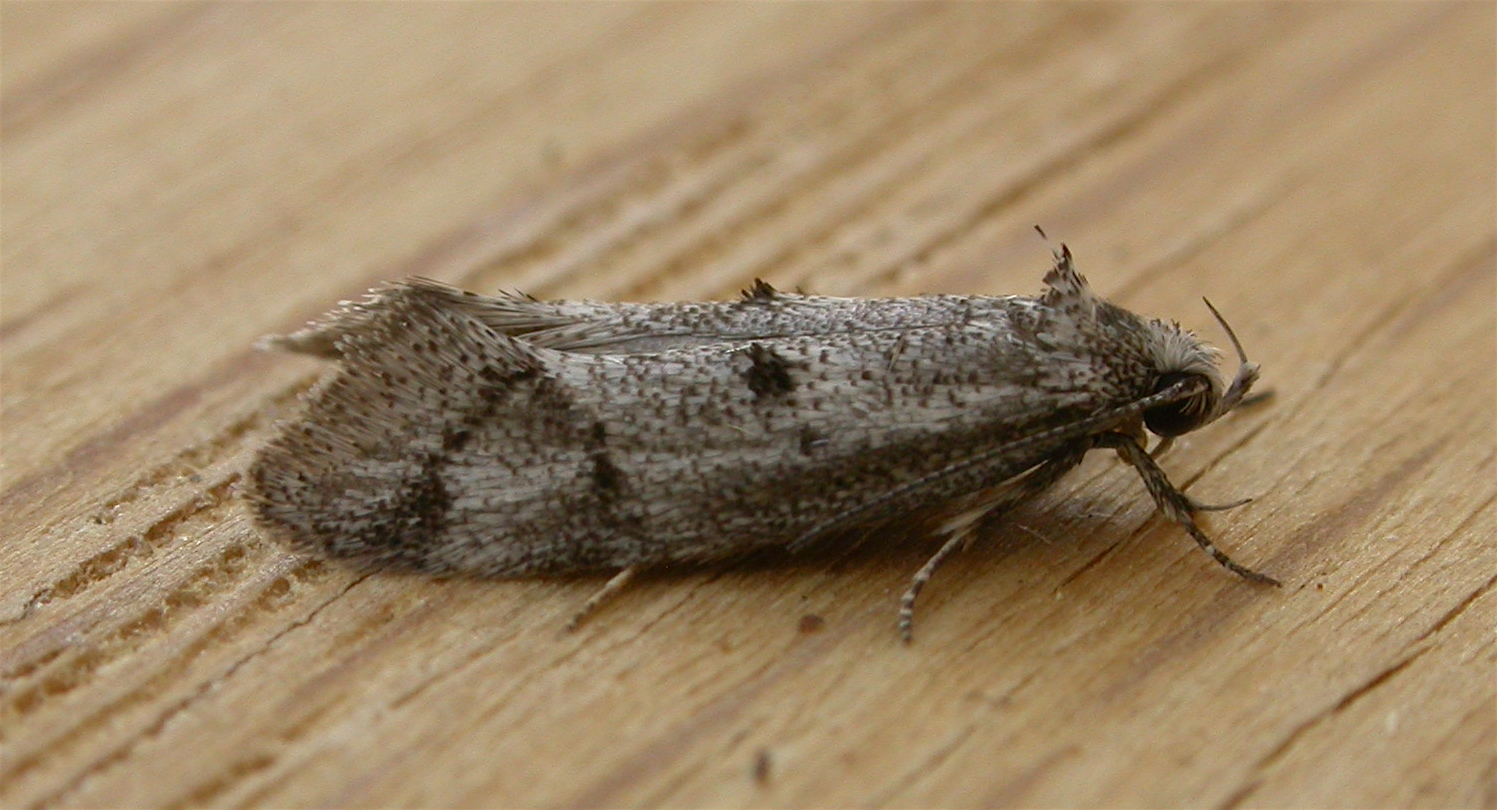

Scientific classification
- Kingdom: Animalia
- Phylum: Arthropoda
- Clade: Pancrustacea
- Class: Insecta
- Order: Lepidoptera
- Family: Oecophoridae
- Genus: Heterozyga
- Species: H. coppatias

Binomial name
- Heterozyga coppatias Meyrick, 1885

= Heterozyga coppatias =

Species of moth

Heterozyga coppatias is a moth of the family Oecophoridae. It is found in Australia.
