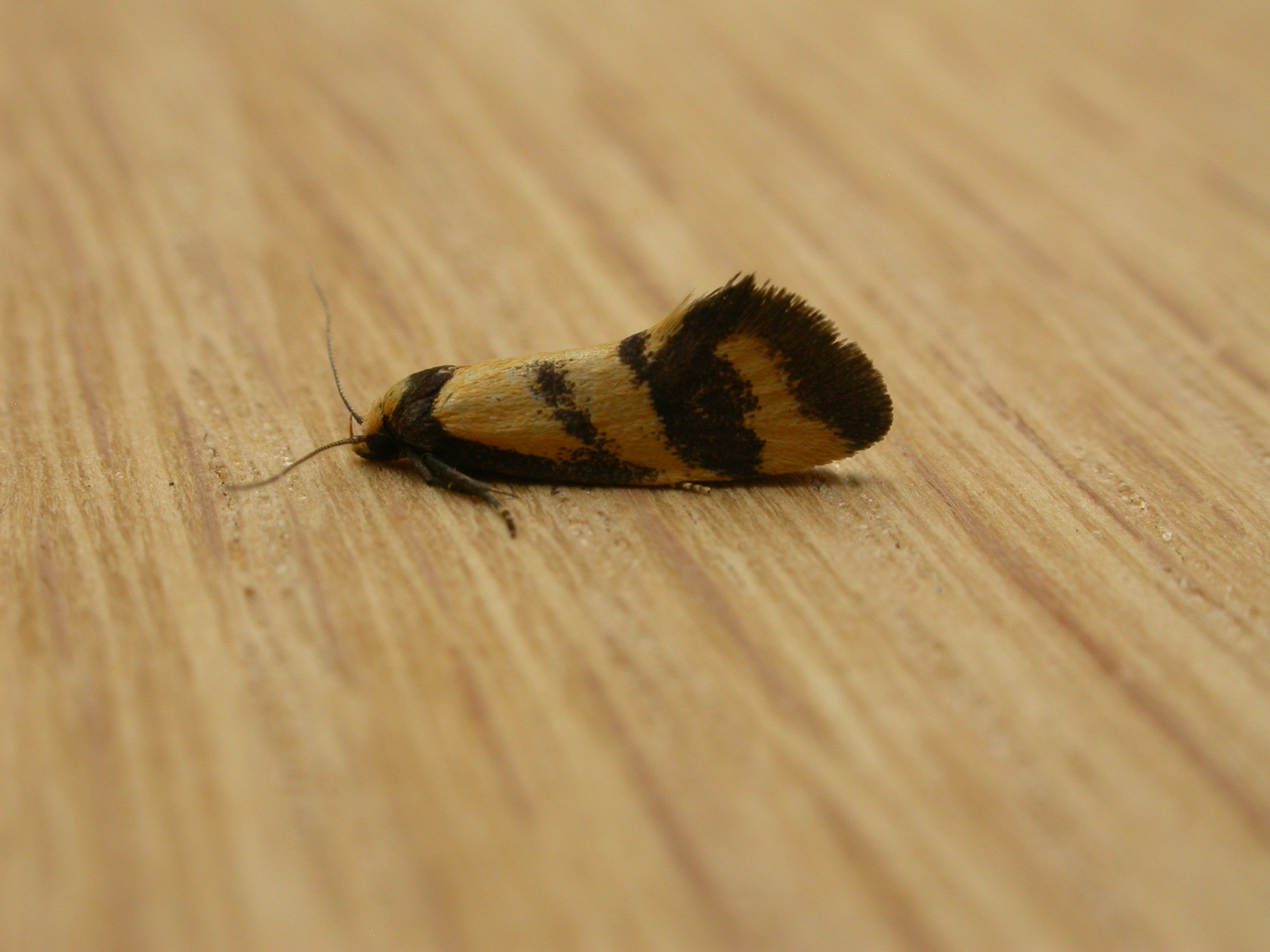

Scientific classification
- Kingdom: Animalia
- Phylum: Arthropoda
- Clade: Pancrustacea
- Class: Insecta
- Order: Lepidoptera
- Family: Oecophoridae
- Genus: Olbonoma
- Species: O. triptycha

Binomial name
- Olbonoma triptycha Meyrick, 1884

= Olbonoma triptycha =

Species of moth

Olbonoma triptycha is a moth of the family Oecophoridae. It is found in Australia.
