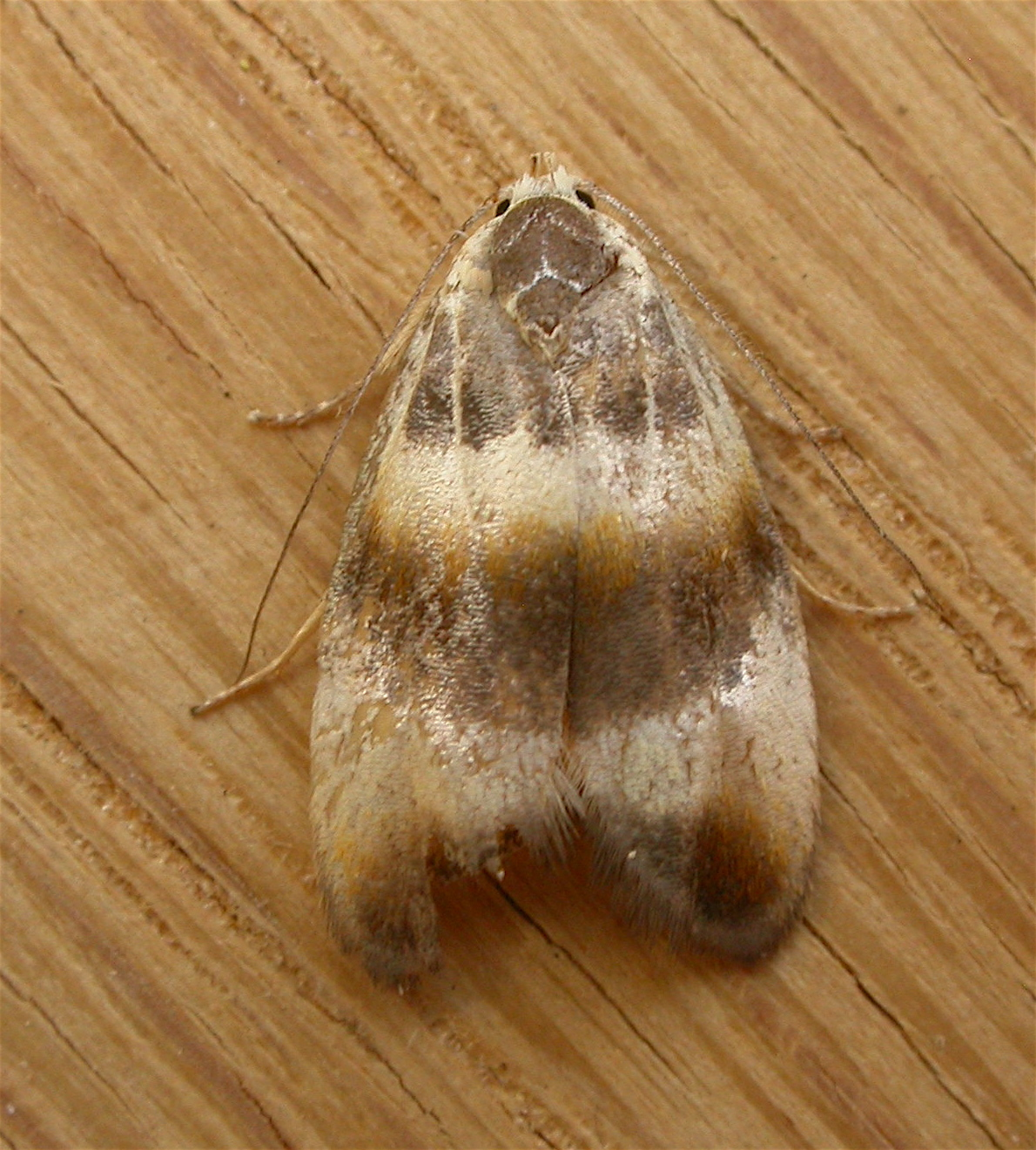

Scientific classification
- Kingdom: Animalia
- Phylum: Arthropoda
- Class: Insecta
- Order: Lepidoptera
- Family: Oecophoridae
- Genus: Piloprepes
- Species: P. anassa

Binomial name
- Piloprepes anassa Meyrick, 1889

= Piloprepes anassa =

Species of moth

Piloprepes anassa is a moth of the family Oecophoridae. It is found in the south-eastern quarter of mainland Australia.

The wingspan is about 20 mm.
