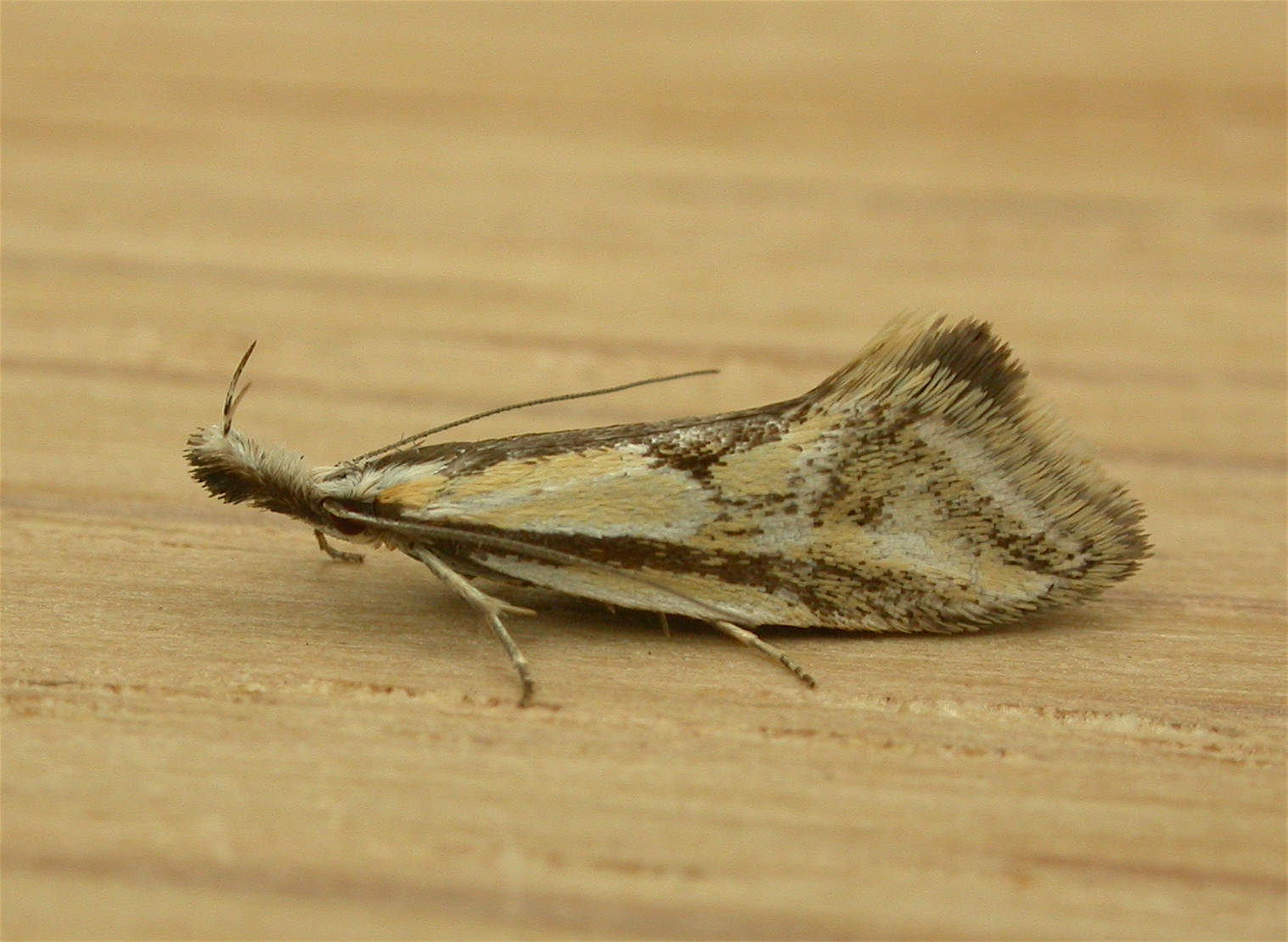

Scientific classification
- Kingdom: Animalia
- Phylum: Arthropoda
- Class: Insecta
- Order: Lepidoptera
- Family: Oecophoridae
- Genus: Thema
- Species: T. macroscia

Binomial name
- Thema macroscia Meyrick, 1889

= Thema macroscia =

Species of moth

Thema macroscia is a moth of the family Oecophoridae. It is found in Australia.

The larvae feed on leaf litter.
