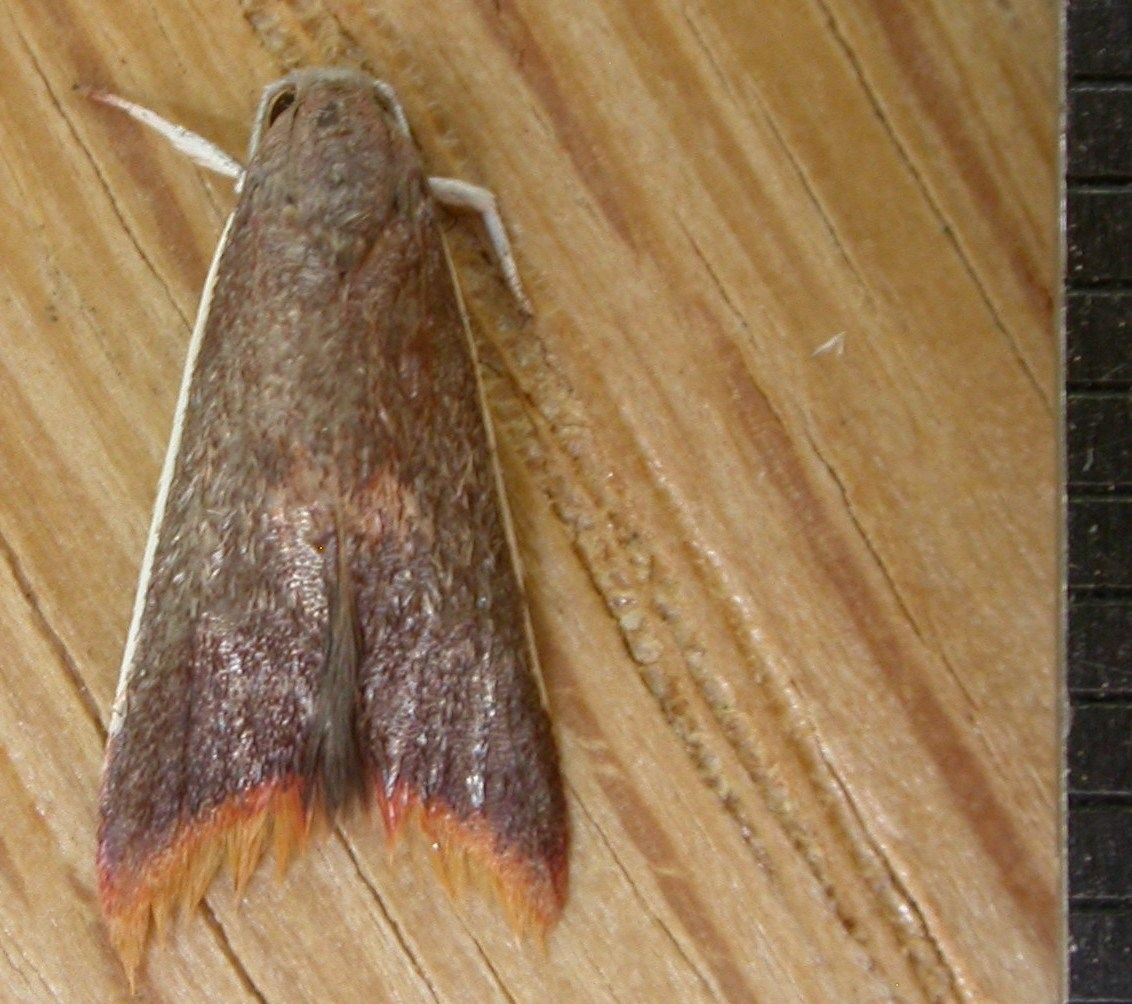

Scientific classification
- Kingdom: Animalia
- Phylum: Arthropoda
- Clade: Pancrustacea
- Class: Insecta
- Order: Lepidoptera
- Family: Oecophoridae
- Genus: Hemibela
- Species: H. callista

Binomial name
- Hemibela callista Meyrick, 1885

= Hemibela callista =

Species of moth

Hemibela callista is a moth of the family Oecophoridae. It is found in Australia in eucalypt forests.
