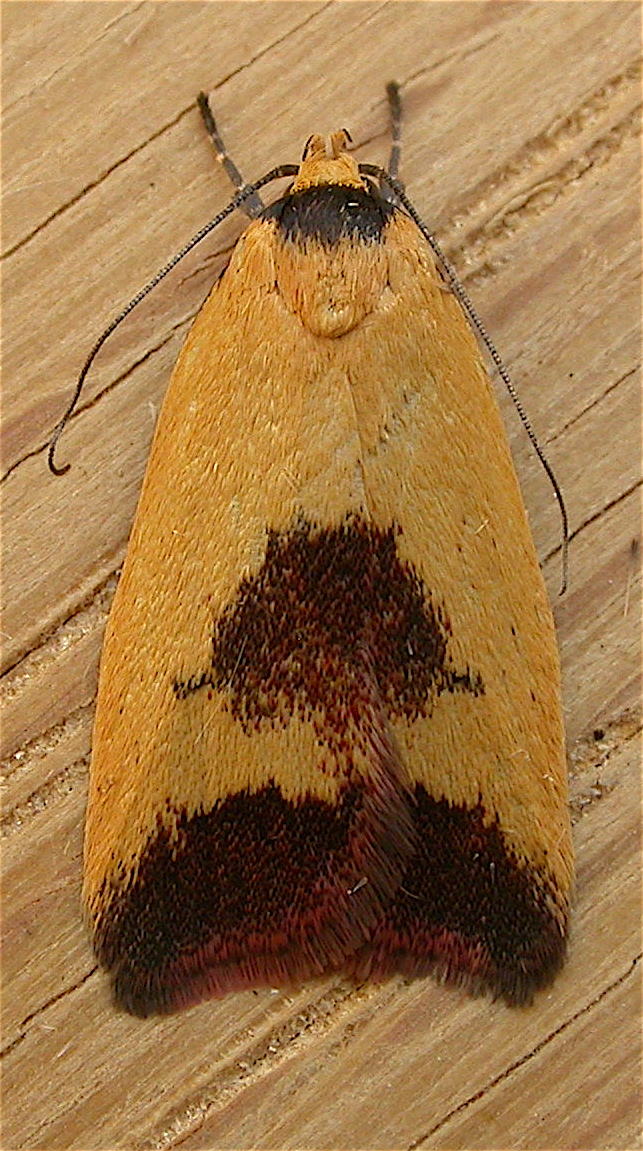

Scientific classification
- Kingdom: Animalia
- Phylum: Arthropoda
- Class: Insecta
- Order: Lepidoptera
- Family: Oecophoridae
- Genus: Ageletha
- Species: A. hemiteles

Binomial name
- Ageletha hemiteles Meyrick, 1883

Synonyms
- Heliocausta hemiteles

= Ageletha hemiteles =

Species of moth

Ageletha hemiteles, the webbing moth, is a moth of the family Oecophoridae. It is found in Australia, more specifically Tasmania, New South Wales and Victoria.

The wingspan is about 25 mm.

The larvae feed on various Eucalyptus species.
