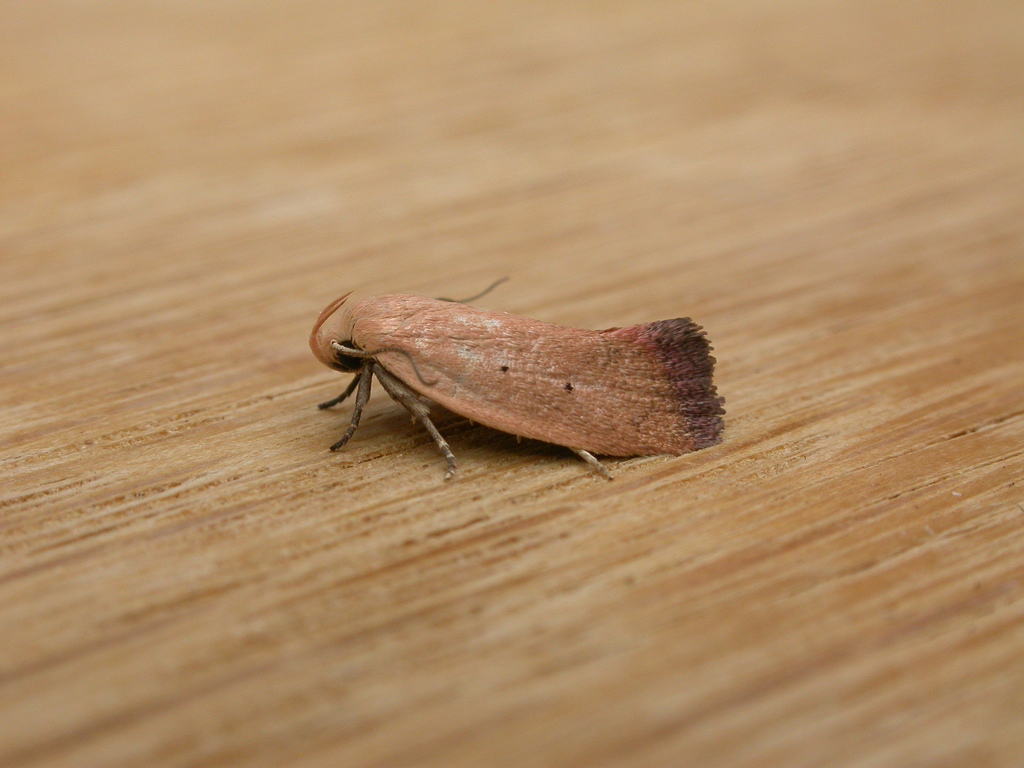

Scientific classification
- Kingdom: Animalia
- Phylum: Arthropoda
- Class: Insecta
- Order: Lepidoptera
- Family: Oecophoridae
- Genus: Acanthodela
- Species: A. protophaes

Binomial name
- Acanthodela protophaes Meyrick, 1883

= Acanthodela protophaes =

Species of moth

Acanthodela protophaes is a moth of the family Oecophoridae. It is found in Australia, including Tasmania.
