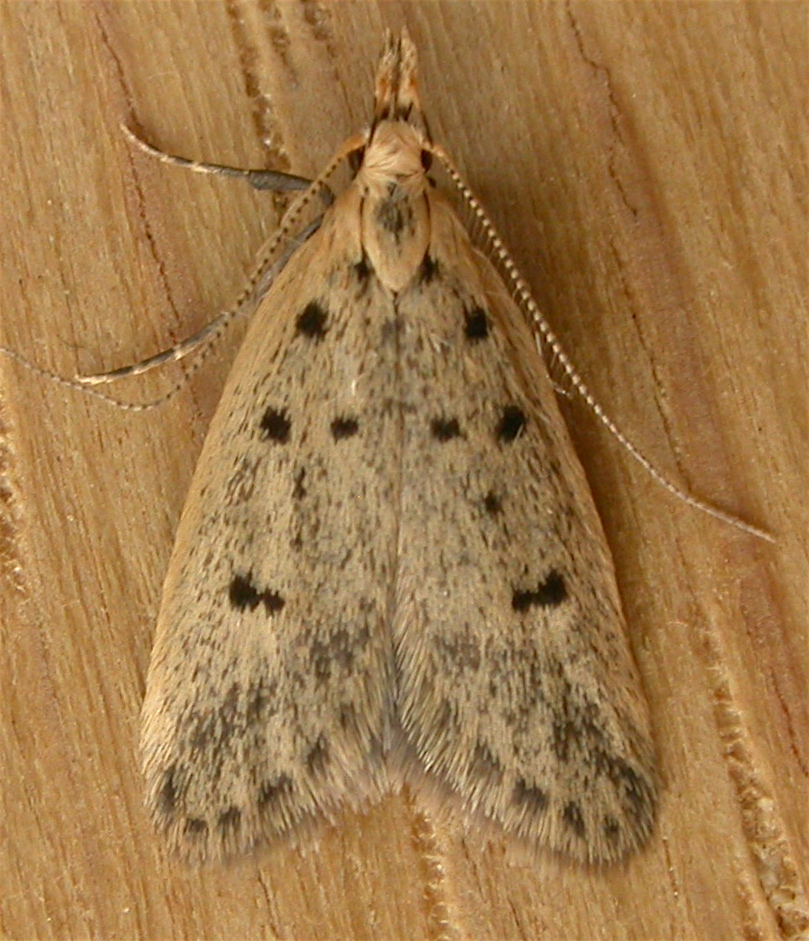

Scientific classification
- Kingdom: Animalia
- Phylum: Arthropoda
- Clade: Pancrustacea
- Class: Insecta
- Order: Lepidoptera
- Family: Oecophoridae
- Genus: Atheropla
- Species: A. decaspila

Binomial name
- Atheropla decaspila Meyrick, 1889

= Atheropla decaspila =

Species of moth

Atheropla decaspila is a moth of the family Oecophoridae. It is found in Australia.
