= Pansepta splendens =

Scientific classification
- Kingdom: Animalia
- Phylum: Arthropoda
- Class: Insecta
- Order: Lepidoptera
- Family: Xyloryctidae
- Genus: Pansepta
- Species: P. splendens

Binomial name
- Pansepta splendens Diakonoff, 1954

Species of moth

Pansepta splendens is a moth in the family Xyloryctidae. It was described by Alexey Diakonoff in 1954. It is found in New Guinea.
