= Caenorycta thiobapta =

Scientific classification
- Kingdom: Animalia
- Phylum: Arthropoda
- Class: Insecta
- Order: Lepidoptera
- Family: Xyloryctidae
- Genus: Caenorycta
- Species: C. thiobapta

Binomial name
- Caenorycta thiobapta Meyrick, 1930

Species of moth

Caenorycta thiobapta is a moth in the family Xyloryctidae. It was described by Edward Meyrick in 1930. It is found on New Guinea.
