= Prothamnodes platycycla =

Scientific classification
- Domain: Eukaryota
- Kingdom: Animalia
- Phylum: Arthropoda
- Class: Insecta
- Order: Lepidoptera
- Family: Xyloryctidae
- Genus: Prothamnodes
- Species: P. platycycla

Binomial name
- Prothamnodes platycycla Meyrick, 1923

Species of moth

Prothamnodes platycycla is a moth in the family Xyloryctidae. It was described by Edward Meyrick in 1923. It is known from Myanmar.

The wingspan is about 23 mm. The forewings are light greyish ochreous, the costal edge ochreous whitish except towards the base. The stigmata are small and dark grey, the plical very obliquely beyond the first discal. There is a curved subterminal line of irregular blackish-grey dots and a terminal series of small indistinct dark grey dots. The hindwings are whitish grey, somewhat darker posteriorly, the apical edge marked with dark grey suffusion and with a small cloudy dark grey spot on the costa beyond the middle.
