= Cladophantis xylophracta =

Scientific classification
- Kingdom: Animalia
- Phylum: Arthropoda
- Class: Insecta
- Order: Lepidoptera
- Family: Xyloryctidae
- Genus: Cladophantis
- Species: C. xylophracta

Binomial name
- Cladophantis xylophracta Meyrick, 1918

Species of moth

Cladophantis xylophracta is a moth in the family Xyloryctidae. It was described by Edward Meyrick in 1918. It is found in South Africa.

The wingspan is about 21 mm. The forewings are lilac brown with the extreme costal edge ochreous. There are three very indistinct interrupted lines or a series of dots of blackish irroration (sprinkles), the first at about one-third, oblique and angled on the fold, the second from a small round spot beneath the middle of the costa to a larger spot on the dorsum before the tornus, the third curved from three-fourths of the costa to a pre-tornal spot. There is a terminal series of black dots. The hindwings are grey whitish.
