= Exoditis boisduvalella =

Scientific classification
- Kingdom: Animalia
- Phylum: Arthropoda
- Class: Insecta
- Order: Lepidoptera
- Family: Xyloryctidae
- Genus: Exoditis
- Species: E. boisduvalella

Binomial name
- Exoditis boisduvalella Viette, 1956

Species of moth

Exoditis boisduvalella is a species of moth found in the family Xyloryctidae. It was described by Pierre Viette in 1956. It is endemic to Madagascar.
