= Phracyps waterloti =

Scientific classification
- Kingdom: Animalia
- Phylum: Arthropoda
- Class: Insecta
- Order: Lepidoptera
- Family: Xyloryctidae
- Genus: Phracyps
- Species: P. waterloti

Binomial name
- Phracyps waterloti Viette, 1952

Species of moth

Phracyps waterloti is a moth in the family Xyloryctidae. It was described by Viette in 1952. It is found in Madagascar.
