= Caenorycta platyleucota =

Scientific classification
- Kingdom: Animalia
- Phylum: Arthropoda
- Class: Insecta
- Order: Lepidoptera
- Family: Xyloryctidae
- Genus: Caenorycta
- Species: C. platyleucota

Binomial name
- Caenorycta platyleucota Meyrick, 1938

Species of moth

Caenorycta platyleucota is a moth in the family Xyloryctidae. It was described by Edward Meyrick in 1938. It is found on New Guinea.
