= Leptobelistis isthmodes =

Scientific classification
- Kingdom: Animalia
- Phylum: Arthropoda
- Clade: Pancrustacea
- Class: Insecta
- Order: Lepidoptera
- Family: Xyloryctidae
- Genus: Leptobelistis
- Species: L. isthmodes

Binomial name
- Leptobelistis isthmodes (Meyrick, 1922)

Synonyms
- Oegoconia isthmodes Meyrick, 1922

Species of moth

Leptobelistis isthmodes is a moth in the family Xyloryctidae. It was described by Edward Meyrick in 1922. It is found in Australia, where it has been recorded from New South Wales and Victoria.

The wingspan is about 14 mm. The forewings are whitish with a narrow irregular dark fuscous almost basal fascia and a narrow irregular dark fuscous streak along the dorsum from one-fourth to the tornus, confluent with two very irregular transverse blotches in the disc representing the stigmata. The costal edge is grey, with some grey irroration (sprinkles) just beneath it, broader from the middle to four-fifths. There is also some fuscous irroration along the termen. The hindwings are light grey.
