= Caenorycta anholochrysa =

Scientific classification
- Domain: Eukaryota
- Kingdom: Animalia
- Phylum: Arthropoda
- Class: Insecta
- Order: Lepidoptera
- Family: Xyloryctidae
- Genus: Caenorycta
- Species: C. anholochrysa

Binomial name
- Caenorycta anholochrysa (Diakonoff, 1966)

Synonyms
- Coenorycta anholochrysa Diakonoff, 1966

Species of moth

Caenorycta anholochrysa is a moth in the family Xyloryctidae. It was described by Alexey Diakonoff in 1966. It is found on Sulawesi.
