= Compsotorna oligarchica =

Scientific classification
- Domain: Eukaryota
- Kingdom: Animalia
- Phylum: Arthropoda
- Class: Insecta
- Order: Lepidoptera
- Family: Xyloryctidae
- Genus: Compsotorna
- Species: C. oligarchica

Binomial name
- Compsotorna oligarchica Meyrick, 1890

Synonyms
- Theiosia aetheria H. Lucas, 1902

Species of moth

Compsotorna oligarchica is a moth in the family Xyloryctidae. It was described by Edward Meyrick in 1890. It is found in Australia, where it has been recorded from New South Wales and Queensland.

The wingspan is 22–28 mm. The forewings are whitish ochreous, with a few fine scattered black scales and with a fuscous-grey straight longitudinal streak above the middle from the base to near the apex, margined beneath the first with blackish and then with an ochreous suffusion, and above and posteriorly by a white suffusion reaching almost to the costa. There is a triangular reddish-brown spot in the disc at two-thirds, with a central transverse pale mark, its upperside rounded and whitish margined, intersecting the fuscous longitudinal streak, its two lower sides black margined. The hindwings are whitish ochreous.
