= Iulactis insignis =

Scientific classification
- Kingdom: Animalia
- Phylum: Arthropoda
- Class: Insecta
- Order: Lepidoptera
- Family: Xyloryctidae
- Genus: Iulactis
- Species: I. insignis

Binomial name
- Iulactis insignis (Meyrick, 1904)

Synonyms
- Dectobathra insignis Meyrick, 1904

Species of moth

Iulactis insignis is a moth in the family Xyloryctidae. It was described by Edward Meyrick in 1904. It is found in Australia, where it has been recorded from New South Wales and Queensland.

The wingspan is 11–12 mm. The forewings are shining white with a triangular blackish-grey blotch on the base of the dorsum and a deep golden-ochreous fascia from the middle of the costa to three-fourths of the dorsum, acutely angulated in the middle. Three deep golden-ochreous marks are found on the costa beyond this, connected beneath. There is a series of six longitudinal black lines before the termen, the two upper ones surrounded with ochreous suffusion. The hindwings are grey, lighter towards the base.
