= Brachybelistis neomorpha =

Scientific classification
- Kingdom: Animalia
- Phylum: Arthropoda
- Class: Insecta
- Order: Lepidoptera
- Family: Xyloryctidae
- Genus: Brachybelistis
- Species: B. neomorpha

Binomial name
- Brachybelistis neomorpha (Turner, 1898)

Synonyms
- Xylorycta neomorpha Turner, 1898

Species of moth

Brachybelistis neomorpha is a moth in the family Xyloryctidae. It was described by Turner in 1898. It is found in Australia, where it has been recorded from New South Wales, Queensland and South Australia.

The wingspan is about 25 mm for males and 34 mm for females. The forewings are whitish-grey with a pale-orange line along the costa and a large blotch in the disc, extending to the inner margin, but not to the costa, irrorated more or less densely with reddish-brown scales. In this are two elongate pale-orange spots at two-fifths and three-fifths of the disc. A third similar spot is found on the fold obliquely below the first, sometimes obsolete. The hindwings are dark fuscous.
