= Hylypnes pudica =

Scientific classification
- Domain: Eukaryota
- Kingdom: Animalia
- Phylum: Arthropoda
- Class: Insecta
- Order: Lepidoptera
- Family: Xyloryctidae
- Genus: Hylypnes
- Species: H. pudica

Binomial name
- Hylypnes pudica (Lower, 1896)

Synonyms
- Crypsicharis pudica Lower, 1896

Species of moth

Hylypnes pudica is a moth in the family Xyloryctidae. It was described by Oswald Bertram Lower in 1896. It is found in Australia, where it has been recorded from New South Wales and Queensland.

The wingspan is about 20 mm for males and 22 mm for females. The forewings are creamy white, with the extreme costal edge fuscous towards the base (faintly perceptible), a small black dot in the middle of the wing at one-third and a second obliquely beyond on the fold, as well as a third above the second. There is a series of fuscous dots from beneath the costa at two-thirds, curved around the hindmargin to the inner margin before the anal angle. The hindwings are white.
