= Eupetochira xystopala =

Scientific classification
- Kingdom: Animalia
- Phylum: Arthropoda
- Class: Insecta
- Order: Lepidoptera
- Family: Xyloryctidae
- Genus: Eupetochira
- Species: E. xystopala

Binomial name
- Eupetochira xystopala (Meyrick, 1908)

Synonyms
- Nephantis xystopala Meyrick, 1908

Species of moth

Eupetochira xystopala is a moth in the family Xyloryctidae. It was described by Edward Meyrick in 1908. It is found in Gauteng, South Africa.

The wingspan is 24–26 mm. The forewings are white with a narrow light brownish-ochreous stripe above the middle from the base to the apex. The hindwings are light grey, paler and tinged with whitish ochreous anteriorly.
