= Athrypsiastis rosiflora =

Scientific classification
- Kingdom: Animalia
- Phylum: Arthropoda
- Class: Insecta
- Order: Lepidoptera
- Family: Xyloryctidae
- Genus: Athrypsiastis
- Species: A. rosiflora

Binomial name
- Athrypsiastis rosiflora Meyrick, 1930

Species of moth

Athrypsiastis rosiflora is a moth in the family Xyloryctidae. It was described by Edward Meyrick in 1930. It is found on New Guinea.
