= Ghuryx perinetella =

Scientific classification
- Kingdom: Animalia
- Phylum: Arthropoda
- Class: Insecta
- Order: Lepidoptera
- Family: Xyloryctidae
- Genus: Ghuryx
- Species: G. perinetella

Binomial name
- Ghuryx perinetella Viette, 1956

Species of moth

Ghuryx perinetella is a moth in the family Xyloryctidae. It was described by Viette in 1956. It is found in Madagascar.
