= Athrypsiastis salva =

Scientific classification
- Kingdom: Animalia
- Phylum: Arthropoda
- Class: Insecta
- Order: Lepidoptera
- Family: Xyloryctidae
- Genus: Athrypsiastis
- Species: A. salva

Binomial name
- Athrypsiastis salva Meyrick, 1932

Species of moth

Athrypsiastis salva is a moth in the family Xyloryctidae. It was described by Edward Meyrick in 1932. It is found in China.
