= Heterochyta xenomorpha =

Scientific classification
- Kingdom: Animalia
- Phylum: Arthropoda
- Class: Insecta
- Order: Lepidoptera
- Family: Xyloryctidae
- Genus: Heterochyta
- Species: H. xenomorpha

Binomial name
- Heterochyta xenomorpha Meyrick, 1906

Species of moth

Heterochyta xenomorpha is a moth in the family Xyloryctidae. It was described by Edward Meyrick in 1906. It is found in Western Australia. The wingspan is about 19 mm. The forewings are fuscous very finely sprinkled with whitish points, with a very few scattered black specks. The stigmata are small and blackish, with the plical obliquely before the first discal, the second discal transversely double. The hindwings are light fuscous.
