= Anoditica autopa =

Scientific classification
- Kingdom: Animalia
- Phylum: Arthropoda
- Class: Insecta
- Order: Lepidoptera
- Family: Geometridae
- Genus: Anoditica
- Species: A. autopa

Binomial name
- Anoditica autopa Meyrick, 1938

Species of moth

Anoditica autopa is a moth in the family Xyloryctidae. It was described by Edward Meyrick in 1938. It is found in the former Orientale Province of the Democratic Republic of the Congo.
