= Paralecta iocapna =

Scientific classification
- Domain: Eukaryota
- Kingdom: Animalia
- Phylum: Arthropoda
- Class: Insecta
- Order: Lepidoptera
- Family: Xyloryctidae
- Genus: Paralecta
- Species: P. iocapna

Binomial name
- Paralecta iocapna Meyrick, 1925

Species of moth

Paralecta iocapna is a moth in the family Xyloryctidae. It was described by Edward Meyrick in 1925. It is found on New Guinea.

The wingspan is about 31 mm. The forewings are pale greyish ochreous, with some scattered dark fuscous scales and with the costa slenderly fulvous, beneath this is a rather thick attenuated white streak from the base to the middle, limited by a suffused dark greyish-violet streak from the base of the dorsum extended slenderly beneath the costal edge to near the apex, with projections on the dorsum and transverse vein. Adjoining this is a brownish patch extending on the dorsum to the middle and in the disc to three-fourths, the edge between these deeply concave. The hindwings are whitish, with the apex greyish.
