= Hylypnes isosticha =

Scientific classification
- Domain: Eukaryota
- Kingdom: Animalia
- Phylum: Arthropoda
- Class: Insecta
- Order: Lepidoptera
- Family: Xyloryctidae
- Genus: Hylypnes
- Species: H. isosticha

Binomial name
- Hylypnes isosticha (Meyrick, 1915)

Synonyms
- Odites isosticha Meyrick, 1915

Species of moth

Hylypnes isosticha is a moth in the family Xyloryctidae. It was described by Edward Meyrick in 1915. It is found in Australia, where it has been recorded in Queensland.

The wingspan is about 22 mm (0.87 in). The forewings are whitish ochreous with a small oblique fuscous mark on the base of the costa. The stigmata are small and dark fuscous, the plical obliquely beyond the first discal. There is a very strongly curved subterminal series of cloudy dark fuscous dots from beneath the costa beyond the middle to above the dorsum beyond the middle and a series of dark fuscous dots around the posterior part of the costa and termen. The hindwings are whitish.
