= Sphalerostola argobela =

Scientific classification
- Kingdom: Animalia
- Phylum: Arthropoda
- Class: Insecta
- Order: Lepidoptera
- Family: Xyloryctidae
- Genus: Sphalerostola
- Species: S. argobela

Binomial name
- Sphalerostola argobela Meyrick, 1931

Species of moth

Sphalerostola argobela is a moth in the family Xyloryctidae. It was described by Edward Meyrick in 1931. It is found on New Guinea.
