= Athrypsiastis symmetra =

Scientific classification
- Kingdom: Animalia
- Phylum: Arthropoda
- Class: Insecta
- Order: Lepidoptera
- Family: Xyloryctidae
- Genus: Athrypsiastis
- Species: A. symmetra

Binomial name
- Athrypsiastis symmetra Meyrick, 1915

Species of moth

Athrypsiastis symmetra is a moth in the family Xyloryctidae. It was described by Edward Meyrick in 1915. It is found on New Guinea.

The wingspan is about 21 mm. The forewings are white with the dorsum faintly tinged with pale grey suffusion. The hindwings are white.
