= Boydia criniferella =

Scientific classification
- Kingdom: Animalia
- Phylum: Arthropoda
- Clade: Pancrustacea
- Class: Insecta
- Order: Lepidoptera
- Family: Xyloryctidae
- Genus: Boydia
- Species: B. criniferella

Binomial name
- Boydia criniferella Newman in 1856

Synonyms
- Hypertricha ephelota Meyrick, 1890

Species of moth

Boydia criniferella is a moth in the family Xyloryctidae. It was described by 1856. It is found in Australia, where it has been recorded from South Australia and Victoria.

The wingspan is about 24 mm. The forewings are fuscous, irregularly strewn with ashy-whitish scales and with an ill-defined dot of dark fuscous scales on the submedian fold at one-fourth, a second in the middle of the disc, a third on the fold beneath the second, a fourth in the disc at three-fourths, and traces of a fifth on the fold towards the anal angle. The second and fourth connected by an ashy-whitish streak, and a less marked similar streak connecting the other three. There are some dark fuscous scales on the veins posteriorly. The hindwings are fuscous with the costal hairs bright ochreous towards the base.
