= Mnarolitia nectaropa =

Scientific classification
- Kingdom: Animalia
- Phylum: Arthropoda
- Clade: Pancrustacea
- Class: Insecta
- Order: Lepidoptera
- Family: Xyloryctidae
- Genus: Mnarolitia
- Species: M. nectaropa

Binomial name
- Mnarolitia nectaropa (Meyrick, 1914)

Synonyms
- Odites nectaropa Meyrick, 1914; Cryptolechia argillacea Butler, 1880 (preocc. Zeller)

Species of moth

Mnarolitia nectaropa is a moth in the family Xyloryctidae. It was described by Edward Meyrick in 1914. It is found on Madagascar.

The wingspan is about 30 mm. The forewings are violet ochreous and the hindwings are yellowish.
