= Phracyps longifasciella =

Scientific classification
- Kingdom: Animalia
- Phylum: Arthropoda
- Class: Insecta
- Order: Lepidoptera
- Family: Xyloryctidae
- Genus: Phracyps
- Species: P. longifasciella

Binomial name
- Phracyps longifasciella Viette, 1955

Species of moth

Phracyps longifasciella is a moth in the family Xyloryctidae. It was described by Viette in 1955. It is found in Madagascar.
