= Pansepta hierophanes =

Scientific classification
- Kingdom: Animalia
- Phylum: Arthropoda
- Class: Insecta
- Order: Lepidoptera
- Family: Xyloryctidae
- Genus: Pansepta
- Species: P. hierophanes

Binomial name
- Pansepta hierophanes Meyrick, 1925

Species of moth

Pansepta hierophanes is a moth in the family Xyloryctidae. It was described by Edward Meyrick in 1925. It is found on New Guinea.

The wingspan is about 21 mm. The forewings are shining silvery white with the costal edge grey towards the base. The hindwings are white.
