= Idiomictis rhizonoma =

Scientific classification
- Kingdom: Animalia
- Phylum: Arthropoda
- Class: Insecta
- Order: Lepidoptera
- Family: Xyloryctidae
- Genus: Idiomictis
- Species: I. rhizonoma

Binomial name
- Idiomictis rhizonoma Meyrick, 1935

Species of moth

Idiomictis rhizonoma is a moth in the family Xyloryctidae. It was described by Edward Meyrick in 1935. It is found on Fiji.
