= Chereuta anthracistis =

Scientific classification
- Kingdom: Animalia
- Phylum: Arthropoda
- Class: Insecta
- Order: Lepidoptera
- Family: Xyloryctidae
- Genus: Chereuta
- Species: C. anthracistis

Binomial name
- Chereuta anthracistis Meyrick, 1906

Species of moth

Chereuta anthracistis is a moth in the family Xyloryctidae. It was described by Edward Meyrick in 1930. It is found in Australia, where it has been recorded from Western Australia.

The wingspan is about 10 mm. The forewings are dark bronzy fuscous with coppery reflections, with a few scattered white scales. The hindwings are dark bronzy fuscous.
