= Ghuryx malagasella =

Scientific classification
- Kingdom: Animalia
- Phylum: Arthropoda
- Class: Insecta
- Order: Lepidoptera
- Family: Xyloryctidae
- Genus: Ghuryx
- Species: G. malagasella

Binomial name
- Ghuryx malagasella Viette, 1985

Species of moth

Ghuryx malagasella is a moth in the family Xyloryctidae. It was described by Viette in 1985. It is found in Madagascar.
