= Cyanocrates inventrix =

Scientific classification
- Kingdom: Animalia
- Phylum: Arthropoda
- Class: Insecta
- Order: Lepidoptera
- Family: Xyloryctidae
- Genus: Cyanocrates
- Species: C. inventrix

Binomial name
- Cyanocrates inventrix Meyrick, 1925

Species of moth

Cyanocrates inventrix is a moth in the family Xyloryctidae. It was described by Edward Meyrick in 1925. It is found in Nigeria.

The wingspan is about 43 mm. The forewings are indigo blue suffused with blue blackish between the veins and with a broad very oblique suffused ochreous-white patch extending from beneath the costa anteriorly to beneath the posterior portion of the cell. There is an irregular undefined fascia of suffused ochreous irroration (sprinkling) just before the termen. The hindwings are ochreous white with a blue-blackish terminal fascia, around the apex occupying two-fifths of the wing, narrowed to a point near the tornus.
