= Paralecta vadosa =

Scientific classification
- Domain: Eukaryota
- Kingdom: Animalia
- Phylum: Arthropoda
- Class: Insecta
- Order: Lepidoptera
- Family: Xyloryctidae
- Genus: Paralecta
- Species: P. vadosa

Binomial name
- Paralecta vadosa Meyrick, 1925

Species of moth

Paralecta vadosa is a moth in the family Xyloryctidae. It was described by Edward Meyrick in 1925. It is found on New Guinea.

The wingspan is about 29 mm. The forewings are pale brownish, suffused with whitish towards the costa except towards the apex and with some scattered dark fuscous scales mostly on the veins. The hindwings are ochreous grey whitish.
