= Psarolitia ambreella =

Scientific classification
- Kingdom: Animalia
- Phylum: Arthropoda
- Class: Insecta
- Order: Lepidoptera
- Family: Xyloryctidae
- Genus: Psarolitia
- Species: P. ambreella

Binomial name
- Psarolitia ambreella Viette, 1968

Species of moth

Psarolitia ambreella is a moth in the family Xyloryctidae. It was described by Viette in 1968. It is found in Madagascar.
