= Liparistis monosema =

Scientific classification
- Domain: Eukaryota
- Kingdom: Animalia
- Phylum: Arthropoda
- Class: Insecta
- Order: Lepidoptera
- Family: Xyloryctidae
- Genus: Liparistis
- Species: L. monosema

Binomial name
- Liparistis monosema (Lower, 1893)

Synonyms
- Lichenaula monosema Lower, 1893

Species of moth

Liparistis monosema is a moth in the family Xyloryctidae. It was described by Oswald Bertram Lower in 1893. It is found in Australia, where it has been recorded from South Australia.

The wingspan is 12–16 mm. The forewings are shining white, slightly ochreous posteriorly. The extreme costal edge is blackish towards the base and there is a distinct black spot in the middle of the wing above the anal angle. The hindwings are fuscous.
