= Phthonerodes aristaepennis =

Scientific classification
- Domain: Eukaryota
- Kingdom: Animalia
- Phylum: Arthropoda
- Class: Insecta
- Order: Lepidoptera
- Family: Xyloryctidae
- Genus: Phthonerodes
- Species: P. aristaepennis

Binomial name
- Phthonerodes aristaepennis Diakonoff, 1954

Species of moth

Phthonerodes aristaepennis is a moth in the family Xyloryctidae. It was described by Alexey Diakonoff in 1954. It is found in New Guinea.
