= Gemorodes diclera =

Scientific classification
- Kingdom: Animalia
- Phylum: Arthropoda
- Clade: Pancrustacea
- Class: Insecta
- Order: Lepidoptera
- Family: Xyloryctidae
- Genus: Gemorodes
- Species: G. diclera

Binomial name
- Gemorodes diclera Meyrick, 1925

Species of moth

Gemorodes diclera is a moth in the family Xyloryctidae. It was described by Edward Meyrick in 1925. It is found in South Africa (Western Cape).

The wingspan is about 26 mm. The forewings are grey, irregularly irrorated (sprinkled) with whitish scales tipped with dark fuscous. There is an obscure undefined subbasal fascia of darker irroration. The discal stigmata form spots of dark fuscous irroration, the space between them more whitish suffused. The hindwings are grey.
