= Iulactis semifusca =

Scientific classification
- Kingdom: Animalia
- Phylum: Arthropoda
- Class: Insecta
- Order: Lepidoptera
- Family: Xyloryctidae
- Genus: Iulactis
- Species: I. semifusca

Binomial name
- Iulactis semifusca Meyrick, 1918

Species of moth

Iulactis semifusca is a moth in the family Xyloryctidae. It was described by Edward Meyrick in 1918. It is found in Australia, where it has been recorded from New South Wales and Queensland.

The wingspan is 10–11 mm. The forewings are brown, on the dorsal half or sometimes wholly suffused with fuscous. There is a broad white supramedian streak from the base to two-thirds, not quite reaching the costal edge on its basal half, then narrowed to the extremity. There is a very oblique slender white streak from the costa beyond the middle to the extremity of a black subapical dash and there are two short white transverse marks from the costa beyond this, and a white wedge-shaped spot along the apical part of the costa, as well as a white suboval blotch almost on the lower half of the termen, marked with four or five fine black longitudinal lines. The hindwings are light grey, somewhat darker posteriorly.
