= Athrypsiastis phaeoleuca =

Scientific classification
- Kingdom: Animalia
- Phylum: Arthropoda
- Class: Insecta
- Order: Lepidoptera
- Family: Xyloryctidae
- Genus: Athrypsiastis
- Species: A. phaeoleuca

Binomial name
- Athrypsiastis phaeoleuca Meyrick, 1910

Species of moth

Athrypsiastis phaeoleuca is a moth in the family Xyloryctidae. It was described by Edward Meyrick in 1910. It is found on New Guinea.

The wingspan is about 17 mm. The forewings are pale ochreous brown and the hindwings are white.
