= Prothamnodes bathocentrella =

Scientific classification
- Kingdom: Animalia
- Phylum: Arthropoda
- Class: Insecta
- Order: Lepidoptera
- Family: Xyloryctidae
- Genus: Prothamnodes
- Species: P. bathocentrella

Binomial name
- Prothamnodes bathocentrella Viette, 1968

Species of moth

Prothamnodes bathocentrella is a moth in the family Xyloryctidae. It is found in eastern Madagascar (Maraonasetra).

The wingspan is 31 mm, the length of the forewings 14.5mm that are beige-ochreous with some rusty-brown irrorations.
