= Leptobelistis asemanta =

Scientific classification
- Kingdom: Animalia
- Phylum: Arthropoda
- Class: Insecta
- Order: Lepidoptera
- Family: Xyloryctidae
- Genus: Leptobelistis
- Species: L. asemanta

Binomial name
- Leptobelistis asemanta Turner, 1902

Species of moth

Leptobelistis asemanta is a moth in the family Xyloryctidae. It was described by Alfred Jefferis Turner in 1902. It is found in Australia, where it has been recorded from Queensland.

The wingspan is 12–15 mm. The forewings are white, sparsely irrorated with dark fuscous. There are three large fuscous spots on the inner margin at the base, the middle and the anal angle. The hindwings are pale grey.

The larvae feed on Eucalyptus species.
