= Phthonerodes scotarcha =

Scientific classification
- Kingdom: Animalia
- Phylum: Arthropoda
- Class: Insecta
- Order: Lepidoptera
- Family: Xyloryctidae
- Genus: Phthonerodes
- Species: P. scotarcha

Binomial name
- Phthonerodes scotarcha Meyrick, 1890

Synonyms
- Psilosceles dichochroa Turner, 1939

Species of moth

Phthonerodes scotarcha is a moth in the family Xyloryctidae. It was described by Edward Meyrick in 1890. It is found in Australia, where it has been recorded from New South Wales, South Australia, Victoria and Western Australia.

The wingspan is 17–18.8 mm for males and 17.6-22.4 mm for females. The forewings are fuscous, densely irrorated (sprinkled) with blackish fuscous and with a straight white dark-margined longitudinal line from the base below the middle, more or less nearly approaching the hindmargin above the anal angle, but suffused and indistinct posteriorly, interrupted by a small dark fuscous spot in the middle. The hindwings are light yellow, sometimes with some fuscous scales at the extreme apex.
