= Compsotorna eccrita =

Scientific classification
- Domain: Eukaryota
- Kingdom: Animalia
- Phylum: Arthropoda
- Class: Insecta
- Order: Lepidoptera
- Family: Xyloryctidae
- Genus: Compsotorna
- Species: C. eccrita

Binomial name
- Compsotorna eccrita Turner, 1917

Species of moth

Compsotorna eccrita is a moth in the family Xyloryctidae. It was described by Alfred Jefferis Turner in 1917. It is found in Australia, where it has been recorded from Queensland.

The wingspan is about 32 mm. The forewings are fuscous with a large ill-defined basal subcostal whitish suffusion and a large ochreous-whitish tornal suffusion extending nearly to the apex, and connected with the basal suffusion above the fold. Some blackish scales tend to form a streak on the basal half of the fold and there is a large irregularly oval discal spot beyond the middle, fuscous outlined with blackish. Several fine short blackish streaks are found between this and the apex. The hindwings are ochreous-whitish.
