= Mnarolitia sylvestrella =

Scientific classification
- Kingdom: Animalia
- Phylum: Arthropoda
- Class: Insecta
- Order: Lepidoptera
- Family: Xyloryctidae
- Genus: Mnarolitia
- Species: M. sylvestrella

Binomial name
- Mnarolitia sylvestrella Viette, 1968

Species of moth

Mnarolitia sylvestrella is a moth in the family Xyloryctidae. It was described by Viette in 1968. It is found in Madagascar.
