= Anoditica concretella =

Scientific classification
- Kingdom: Animalia
- Phylum: Arthropoda
- Class: Insecta
- Order: Lepidoptera
- Family: Geometridae
- Genus: Anoditica
- Species: A. concretella

Binomial name
- Anoditica concretella Viette, 1956

Species of moth

Anoditica concretella is a moth in the family Xyloryctidae. It was described by Viette in 1956. It is found in Madagascar.
