= Cladophantis pristina =

Scientific classification
- Kingdom: Animalia
- Phylum: Arthropoda
- Class: Insecta
- Order: Lepidoptera
- Family: Xyloryctidae
- Genus: Cladophantis
- Species: C. pristina

Binomial name
- Cladophantis pristina Meyrick, 1925

Species of moth

Cladophantis pristina is a moth in the family Xyloryctidae. It was described by Edward Meyrick in 1925. It is found in Zimbabwe.

The wingspan is about 28 mm. The forewings are grey whitish irregularly sprinkled with grey scales with minute blackish points. There is a black elongate dot near the base above the middle and three oblique transverse series of very indistinct cloudy dark grey dots, the first from an oblique dark mark on the costa at one-fourth to the middle of the dorsum, the second from the middle of the costa to the dorsum before the tornus, angulated in the middle, the third near beyond this. There are strongly curved blackish stigmata, the first discal on the first series, the second before the second series, the plical obliquely beyond the first discal but hardly distinct. There is also a marginal series of dark fuscous dots around the posterior part of the costa and termen. The hindwings are grey whitish.
