= Eupetochira axysta =

Scientific classification
- Kingdom: Animalia
- Phylum: Arthropoda
- Class: Insecta
- Order: Lepidoptera
- Family: Xyloryctidae
- Genus: Eupetochira
- Species: E. axysta

Binomial name
- Eupetochira axysta Meyrick, 1927

Species of moth

Eupetochira axysta is a moth in the family Xyloryctidae. It was described by Edward Meyrick in 1927. It is found in South Africa.

The wingspan is about 24 mm. The forewings are white and the hindwings are light grey, becoming white towards the dorsum.
