= Paralecta cerocrossa =

Scientific classification
- Domain: Eukaryota
- Kingdom: Animalia
- Phylum: Arthropoda
- Class: Insecta
- Order: Lepidoptera
- Family: Xyloryctidae
- Genus: Paralecta
- Species: P. cerocrossa

Binomial name
- Paralecta cerocrossa Meyrick, 1938

Species of moth

Paralecta cerocrossa is a moth in the family Xyloryctidae. It was described by Edward Meyrick in 1938. It is found on New Guinea.
