= Heterochyta infesta =

Scientific classification
- Domain: Eukaryota
- Kingdom: Animalia
- Phylum: Arthropoda
- Class: Insecta
- Order: Lepidoptera
- Family: Xyloryctidae
- Genus: Heterochyta
- Species: H. infesta

Binomial name
- Heterochyta infesta (Meyrick, 1906)

Synonyms
- Heterobathra infesta Meyrick, 1921

Species of moth

Heterochyta infesta is a moth in the family Xyloryctidae. It was described by Edward Meyrick in 1906. It is found in Australia, where it has been recorded from Victoria.

The wingspan is about 17 mm. The forewings are dark purplish fuscous and the hindwings are rather dark grey.
