= Idiomictis aneuropa =

Scientific classification
- Kingdom: Animalia
- Phylum: Arthropoda
- Class: Insecta
- Order: Lepidoptera
- Family: Xyloryctidae
- Genus: Idiomictis
- Species: I. aneuropa

Binomial name
- Idiomictis aneuropa Meyrick, 1935

Species of moth

Idiomictis aneuropa is a moth in the family Xyloryctidae. It was described by Edward Meyrick in 1935. It is found on Fiji.
