= Pansepta languescens =

Scientific classification
- Kingdom: Animalia
- Phylum: Arthropoda
- Class: Insecta
- Order: Lepidoptera
- Family: Xyloryctidae
- Genus: Pansepta
- Species: P. languescens

Binomial name
- Pansepta languescens Diakonoff, 1954

Species of moth

Pansepta languescens is a moth in the family Xyloryctidae. It was described by Alexey Diakonoff in 1954. It is found in New Guinea.
