= Paralecta isopela =

Scientific classification
- Domain: Eukaryota
- Kingdom: Animalia
- Phylum: Arthropoda
- Class: Insecta
- Order: Lepidoptera
- Family: Xyloryctidae
- Genus: Paralecta
- Species: P. isopela

Binomial name
- Paralecta isopela Meyrick, 1925

Species of moth

Paralecta isopela is a moth in the family Xyloryctidae. It was described by Edward Meyrick in 1925. It is found on New Guinea.

The wingspan is about 28 mm. The forewings are uniform pale brownish and the hindwings are white brownish.
