= Cyanocrates grandis =

Scientific classification
- Domain: Eukaryota
- Kingdom: Animalia
- Phylum: Arthropoda
- Class: Insecta
- Order: Lepidoptera
- Family: Xyloryctidae
- Genus: Cyanocrates
- Species: C. grandis

Binomial name
- Cyanocrates grandis (Druce, 1912)

Synonyms
- Ommatothelxis grandis Druce, 1912

Species of moth

Cyanocrates grandis is a moth in the family Xyloryctidae. It was described by Druce in 1912. It is found in Cameroon and the Democratic Republic of Congo (Orientale).

The forewings are blue-black, crossed about the middle by a wide white band. The base of the wing is very thickly irrorated with bright blue scales and the veins and marginal line are thickly covered with bright metallic blue scales. The hindwings are white, broadly bordered with black at the apex, and partly round the outer margin.
