= Sphalerostola caustogramma =

Scientific classification
- Domain: Eukaryota
- Kingdom: Animalia
- Phylum: Arthropoda
- Class: Insecta
- Order: Lepidoptera
- Family: Xyloryctidae
- Genus: Sphalerostola
- Species: S. caustogramma

Binomial name
- Sphalerostola caustogramma Meyrick, 1927

Species of moth

Sphalerostola caustogramma is a moth in the family Xyloryctidae. It was described by Edward Meyrick in 1927. It is found on New Ireland in Papua New Guinea.

The wingspan is 16–17 mm. The forewings are white with some brown sprinkles towards the base of the costa and a rather broad dorsal streak of grey suffusion sprinkled with dark brown from the base to near the tornus. There is an irregular thick very dark brown streak suffused with whitish ochreous beneath the cell from near the base to the angle and a triangular patch of pale grey suffusion streaked with dark brown sprinkles on the veins from the end of the cell to the whole of the termen, but leaving the terminal edge white with a series of dark brown dots. The hindwings are rather dark grey.
