= Mnarolitia paulianellum =

Scientific classification
- Kingdom: Animalia
- Phylum: Arthropoda
- Class: Insecta
- Order: Lepidoptera
- Family: Xyloryctidae
- Genus: Mnarolitia
- Species: M. paulianellum

Binomial name
- Mnarolitia paulianellum Viette, 1954

Species of moth

Mnarolitia paulianellum is a moth in the family Xyloryctidae. It was described by Viette in 1954. It is found in Madagascar.
