= Niphorycta hemipercna =

Scientific classification
- Kingdom: Animalia
- Phylum: Arthropoda
- Class: Insecta
- Order: Lepidoptera
- Family: Xyloryctidae
- Genus: Niphorycta
- Species: N. hemipercna

Binomial name
- Niphorycta hemipercna Diakonoff, 1954

Species of moth

Niphorycta hemipercna is a moth in the family Xyloryctidae. It was described by Alexey Diakonoff in 1954. It is found in New Guinea.
