= Sphalerostola epierana =

Scientific classification
- Kingdom: Animalia
- Phylum: Arthropoda
- Class: Insecta
- Order: Lepidoptera
- Family: Xyloryctidae
- Genus: Sphalerostola
- Species: S. epierana

Binomial name
- Sphalerostola epierana (Turner, 1947)

Synonyms
- Exapateter epierana Turner, 1947

Species of moth

Sphalerostola epierana is a moth in the family Xyloryctidae. It is found in Australia (Queensland).

The wingspan is 17–19 mm for males and 21–24 mm for females.
