= Crypsicharis triplaca =

Scientific classification
- Domain: Eukaryota
- Kingdom: Animalia
- Phylum: Arthropoda
- Class: Insecta
- Order: Lepidoptera
- Family: Xyloryctidae
- Genus: Crypsicharis
- Species: C. triplaca

Binomial name
- Crypsicharis triplaca Lower, 1923

Species of moth

Crypsicharis triplaca is a moth in the family Xyloryctidae. It was described by Oswald Bertram Lower in 1923.

== Distribution ==
It is found in Australia, where it has been recorded from New South Wales and Queensland.

== Description ==
The wingspan is about 22 mm. The forewings are white, with fuscous markings and with a moderate somewhat-ovoid spot above the dorsum on the fold, in the middle. There is an erect, moderately thick, fascia-like streak, from the dorsum before the tornus, reaching three-quarters across the wing, the upper half divided into two roundish spots. The hindwings are grey whitish.
