= Paralecta amplificata =

Scientific classification
- Domain: Eukaryota
- Kingdom: Animalia
- Phylum: Arthropoda
- Class: Insecta
- Order: Lepidoptera
- Family: Xyloryctidae
- Genus: Paralecta
- Species: P. amplificata

Binomial name
- Paralecta amplificata Meyrick, 1925

Species of moth

Paralecta amplificata is a moth in the family Xyloryctidae. It was described by Edward Meyrick in 1925. It is found on New Guinea.

The wingspan is 36–37 mm. The forewings are shining silvery white with an ochreous line along the costa, a pale ochreous median line from one-fourth to near the termen, a dot below this on the angle of the cell, an ochreous line along the fold, and one on the dorsal edge from one-fourth to three-fourths. The hindwings are white.
