= Xylomimetes scholastis =

Scientific classification
- Domain: Eukaryota
- Kingdom: Animalia
- Phylum: Arthropoda
- Class: Insecta
- Order: Lepidoptera
- Family: Xyloryctidae
- Genus: Xylomimetes
- Species: X. scholastis

Binomial name
- Xylomimetes scholastis Turner, 1916

Species of moth

Xylomimetes scholastis is a moth in the family Xyloryctidae. It was described by Alfred Jefferis Turner in 1916. It is found in Australia, where it has been recorded from New South Wales and Queensland.

The wingspan is about 40 mm. The forewings are pale whitish-brown with a broad, suffused, white costal streak, narrow at the base, and not reaching the apex. There is a fine, blackish, longitudinal streak from one-fourth to the middle along the upper edge of the cell and there are two or three, fine, short, similar streaks on the veins beyond the middle. The hindwings are ochreous-whitish.
