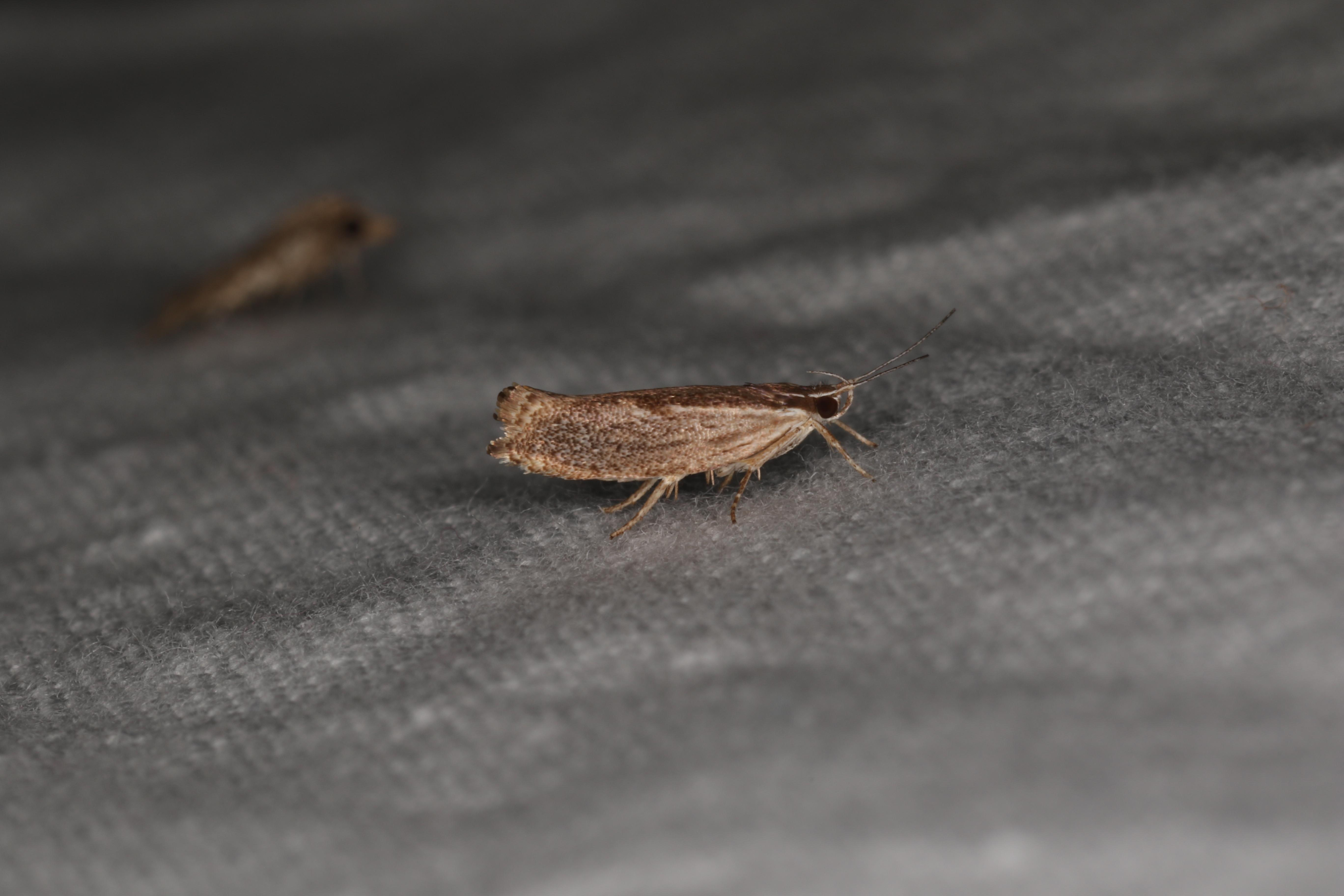
- Phthonerodes peridela

Scientific classification
- Kingdom: Animalia
- Phylum: Arthropoda
- Class: Insecta
- Order: Lepidoptera
- Family: Xyloryctidae
- Genus: Phthonerodes
- Species: P. peridela

Binomial name
- Phthonerodes peridela Common, 1964

= Phthonerodes peridela =

Species of moth

Phthonerodes peridela is a moth in the family Xyloryctidae. It was described by Ian Francis Bell Common in 1964. It is found in Australia, where it has been recorded from the Australian Capital Territory, New South Wales and Queensland.
