= Gemorodes delphinopa =

Scientific classification
- Kingdom: Animalia
- Phylum: Arthropoda
- Class: Insecta
- Order: Lepidoptera
- Family: Xyloryctidae
- Genus: Gemorodes
- Species: G. delphinopa

Binomial name
- Gemorodes delphinopa Meyrick, 1930

Species of moth

Gemorodes delphinopa is a moth in the family Xyloryctidae. It was described by Edward Meyrick in 1930. It is found in Myanmar.
