= Chereuta chalcistis =

Scientific classification
- Kingdom: Animalia
- Phylum: Arthropoda
- Class: Insecta
- Order: Lepidoptera
- Family: Xyloryctidae
- Genus: Chereuta
- Species: C. chalcistis

Binomial name
- Chereuta chalcistis Meyrick, 1906

Species of moth

Chereuta chalcistis is a moth in the family Xyloryctidae. It was described by Edward Meyrick in 1906. It is found in Australia, where it has been recorded from Western Australia.

The wingspan is 13–16 mm. The forewings are fuscous, irrorated (sprinkled) with dark fuscous and mixed with yellowish brown. The stigmata are very obscurely indicated with dark fuscous scales, the plical somewhat beyond the first discal. The hindwings are dark fuscous, darkest towards the apex.
