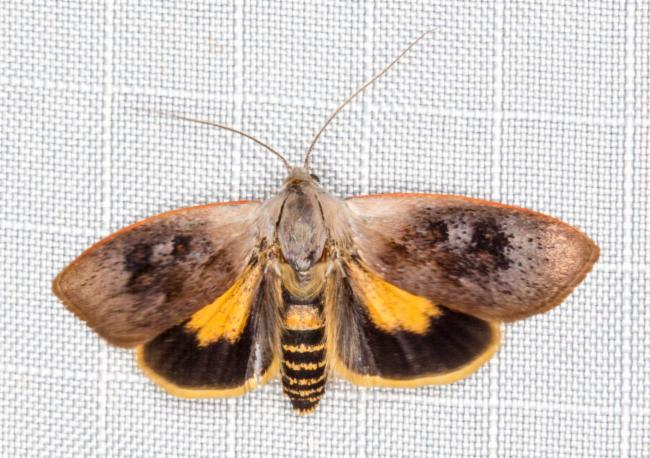

Scientific classification
- Kingdom: Animalia
- Phylum: Arthropoda
- Class: Insecta
- Order: Lepidoptera
- Family: Xyloryctidae
- Genus: Brachybelistis
- Species: B. pentachroa

Binomial name
- Brachybelistis pentachroa (Lower, 1901)

Synonyms
- Xylorycta pentachroa Lower, 1901

= Brachybelistis pentachroa =

Species of moth

Brachybelistis pentachroa is a moth in the family Xyloryctidae. It was described by Oswald Bertram Lower in 1901. It is found in Australia, where it has been recorded from New South Wales, the Northern Territory and Queensland.

The wingspan is about 21 mm for males and 30–37 mm for females. The males have ochreous-yellow forewings with a blackish discal dot before the middle, confluent with a large blackish blotch, which occupies the whole posterior half of the wing except the costal and terminal margins. The hindwings are pale ochreous yellow with a broad blackish terminal band. The forewings of the females are whitish, pinkish tinged with four oval ochreous spots, bordered with blackish scales and surrounded with more or less blackish irroration (sprinkles). The first spot is found in the disc at one-third, the second obliquely beyond and below the first, the third and fourth closely approximated, arranged transversely in the disc before two-thirds, the latter more elongate. The hindwings are pale yellowish with a suffused pale grey terminal band.
