= Hylypnes leptosticta =

Scientific classification
- Domain: Eukaryota
- Kingdom: Animalia
- Phylum: Arthropoda
- Class: Insecta
- Order: Lepidoptera
- Family: Xyloryctidae
- Genus: Hylypnes
- Species: H. leptosticta

Binomial name
- Hylypnes leptosticta (Turner, 1947)

Synonyms
- Cryptolechia leptosticta Turner, 1947

Species of moth

Hylypnes leptosticta is a moth in the family Xyloryctidae. It was described by Alfred Jefferis Turner in 1947. It is found in Australia, where it has been recorded from Queensland.
