= Brachybelistis blackburnii =

Scientific classification
- Kingdom: Animalia
- Phylum: Arthropoda
- Class: Insecta
- Order: Lepidoptera
- Family: Xyloryctidae
- Genus: Brachybelistis
- Species: B. blackburnii

Binomial name
- Brachybelistis blackburnii (Lower, 1892)

Synonyms
- Cryptophaga blackburnii Lower, 1892

Species of moth

Brachybelistis blackburnii is a moth in the family Xyloryctidae. It was described by Oswald Bertram Lower in 1892. It is found in Australia, where it has been recorded from South Australia, Victoria and Western Australia.

The wingspan is about 45 mm. The forewings are yellowish-grey whitish, scantily strewn with black scales from the base to two-thirds, except along the costa. The extreme costal edge is pale yellowish and there is a moderate roundish orange spot distinctly edged with minute black scales, in the disc beyond one-third. There is a second more ovate, on the fold below the middle, and a third more suffused beyond the middle, both tending to be suffusedly edged with minute black scales. The hindwings are grey-whitish, more ochreous-tinged towards base.
