= Paralecta chalarodes =

Scientific classification
- Domain: Eukaryota
- Kingdom: Animalia
- Phylum: Arthropoda
- Class: Insecta
- Order: Lepidoptera
- Family: Xyloryctidae
- Genus: Paralecta
- Species: P. chalarodes

Binomial name
- Paralecta chalarodes Meyrick, 1925

Species of moth

Paralecta chalarodes is a moth in the family Xyloryctidae. It was described by Edward Meyrick in 1925. It is found on New Guinea.

== Classification ==
The wingspan is about 26 mm. The forewings are shining whitish, towards the costa white, and with some scattered dark fuscous specks, a blotch of fuscous suffusion resting on the dorsum before the middle and a pale fuscous shade from the costa at two-thirds to the dorsum at three-fourths, angulated in the middle, darker on the dorsum. There is also a pale fuscous suffusion towards the termen, especially towards the middle, and a darker fuscous suffused streak along the termen. The hindwings are whitish.
