= Mnarolitia ambreella =

Scientific classification
- Kingdom: Animalia
- Phylum: Arthropoda
- Class: Insecta
- Order: Lepidoptera
- Family: Xyloryctidae
- Genus: Mnarolitia
- Species: M. ambreella

Binomial name
- Mnarolitia ambreella Viette, 1967

Species of moth

Mnarolitia ambreella is a moth in the family Xyloryctidae. It was described by Viette in 1967. It is found in Madagascar.
