= Paralecta antistola =

Scientific classification
- Kingdom: Animalia
- Phylum: Arthropoda
- Class: Insecta
- Order: Lepidoptera
- Family: Xyloryctidae
- Genus: Paralecta
- Species: P. antistola

Binomial name
- Paralecta antistola Meyrick, 1930

Species of moth

Paralecta antistola is a moth in the family Xyloryctidae, described by Edward Meyrick in 1930. It is found in Malaysia.

The larvae of this species feed on Eugenia caryophyllata. They bore into the stem of their host plant.
