= Athrypsiastis candidella =

Scientific classification
- Kingdom: Animalia
- Phylum: Arthropoda
- Class: Insecta
- Order: Lepidoptera
- Family: Xyloryctidae
- Genus: Athrypsiastis
- Species: A. candidella

Binomial name
- Athrypsiastis candidella (Walker, 1863)

Synonyms
- Topiris candidella Walker, 1863

Species of moth

Athrypsiastis candidella is a moth in the family Xyloryctidae. It was described by Francis Walker in 1863. It is found on Borneo. Adults are silvery white, without any markings.
