= Paralecta nephelodelta =

Scientific classification
- Domain: Eukaryota
- Kingdom: Animalia
- Phylum: Arthropoda
- Class: Insecta
- Order: Lepidoptera
- Family: Xyloryctidae
- Genus: Paralecta
- Species: P. nephelodelta

Binomial name
- Paralecta nephelodelta Meyrick, 1930

Species of moth

Paralecta nephelodelta is a moth in the family Xyloryctidae. It was described by Edward Meyrick in 1930. It is found in Malaysia.
