= Cladophantis spilozeucta =

Scientific classification
- Kingdom: Animalia
- Phylum: Arthropoda
- Class: Insecta
- Order: Lepidoptera
- Family: Xyloryctidae
- Genus: Cladophantis
- Species: C. spilozeucta

Binomial name
- Cladophantis spilozeucta Meyrick, 1927

Species of moth

Cladophantis spilozeucta is a moth in the family Xyloryctidae. It was described by Edward Meyrick in 1927. It is found in South Africa.

The wingspan is about 23 mm. The forewings are fuscous suffusedly mixed with white and with a short dark fuscous dash from the base above the middle and an oblique darker streak from the costa at one-fourth reaching half across the wing. There is an angulated extension of this, and two posterior oblique transverse strongly curved shades faintly indicated. The discal stigmata are black, connected by a fine black line and there is a marginal series of short dark fuscous marks around the posterior part of the costa and termen. The hindwings are grey whitish, the edge slightly marked grey around the apex and upper part of the termen.
