= Heterochyta pyrotypa =

Scientific classification
- Domain: Eukaryota
- Kingdom: Animalia
- Phylum: Arthropoda
- Class: Insecta
- Order: Lepidoptera
- Family: Xyloryctidae
- Genus: Heterochyta
- Species: H. pyrotypa

Binomial name
- Heterochyta pyrotypa Common, 1996

Synonyms
- Pleurota pyrosema Lower, 1899 (preocc. Meyrick, 1884)

Species of moth

Heterochyta pyrotypa is a moth in the family Xyloryctidae. It was described by Ian Francis Bell Common in 1996. It is found in Australia, where it has been recorded from New South Wales.

The wingspan is about 28 mm. The forewings are dark fuscous, finely dusted with black and with an orange-red spot at the end of the cell. There is a hindmarginal row of black dots, continued around the apex to the costa. The hindwings are greyish fuscous.
