= Heterochyta aprepta =

Scientific classification
- Kingdom: Animalia
- Phylum: Arthropoda
- Clade: Pancrustacea
- Class: Insecta
- Order: Lepidoptera
- Family: Xyloryctidae
- Genus: Heterochyta
- Species: H. aprepta

Binomial name
- Heterochyta aprepta (Turner, 1947)

Synonyms
- Macrobela aprepta Turner, 1947

Species of moth

Heterochyta aprepta is a moth in the family Xyloryctidae. It was described by Alfred Jefferis Turner in 1947. It is found in Australia, where it has been recorded from Western Australia. it is characterized as having brown forewings and grey hindwings. these wings are typically 29-30mm long.
