= Pansepta teleturga =

Scientific classification
- Kingdom: Animalia
- Phylum: Arthropoda
- Class: Insecta
- Order: Lepidoptera
- Family: Xyloryctidae
- Genus: Pansepta
- Species: P. teleturga

Binomial name
- Pansepta teleturga Meyrick, 1915

Species of moth

Pansepta teleturga is a moth in the family Xyloryctidae. It was described by Edward Meyrick in 1915. It is found on New Britain of Papua New Guinea.

The wingspan is about 22 mm. The forewings are silvery white and the hindwings are white, towards the posterior half of the costa suffused with grey.
