= Paralecta rhodometallica =

Scientific classification
- Domain: Eukaryota
- Kingdom: Animalia
- Phylum: Arthropoda
- Class: Insecta
- Order: Lepidoptera
- Family: Xyloryctidae
- Genus: Paralecta
- Species: P. rhodometallica

Binomial name
- Paralecta rhodometallica Diakonoff, 1954

Species of moth

Paralecta rhodometallica is a moth in the family Xyloryctidae. It was described by Alexey Diakonoff in 1954. It is found in New Guinea.
