= Heterochyta tetracentra =

Scientific classification
- Kingdom: Animalia
- Phylum: Arthropoda
- Class: Insecta
- Order: Lepidoptera
- Family: Xyloryctidae
- Genus: Heterochyta
- Species: H. tetracentra

Binomial name
- Heterochyta tetracentra (Meyrick, 1906)

Synonyms
- Heterobathra tetracentra Meyrick, 1906

Species of moth

Heterochyta tetracentra is a moth in the family Xyloryctidae. It was described by Edward Meyrick in 1906. It is found in Australia, where it has been recorded from Western Australia.

The wingspan is about 18 mm. The forewings are whitish fuscous densely irrorated (sprinkled) with dark fuscous and with rather large roundish spots of dark fuscous suffusion in the disc at two-fifths and two-thirds, as well as a patch beneath the middle of the disc between these appearing pale through obsolescence of dark fuscous irroration. The hindwings are fuscous.
