= Crypsicharis neocosma =

Scientific classification
- Domain: Eukaryota
- Kingdom: Animalia
- Phylum: Arthropoda
- Class: Insecta
- Order: Lepidoptera
- Family: Xyloryctidae
- Genus: Crypsicharis
- Species: C. neocosma

Binomial name
- Crypsicharis neocosma Meyrick, 1890

Species of moth

Crypsicharis neocosma is a moth in the family Xyloryctidae. It was described by Edward Meyrick in 1890. It is found in Australia, where it has been recorded from New South Wales, the Northern Territory, Queensland and Western Australia.

The wingspan is 18–19 mm. The forewings are whitish ochreous, becoming whitish towards the costa, pale brownish towards the inner margin, posteriorly with a few scattered brown scales. There is a fuscous or dark fuscous dot on the submedian fold before the middle, and a second in the disc at two-thirds as well as a triangular inwardly oblique cloudy fuscous or dark fuscous spot on the inner margin immediately before the anal angle. The hindwings are whitish, the apex more or less tinged with grey.

The larvae live communally in bunches of leaves tied with silk. The larval food plants are Eucalyptus meliodora and Eucalyptus drepanphylla.
