= Niphorycta hypopercna =

Scientific classification
- Kingdom: Animalia
- Phylum: Arthropoda
- Class: Insecta
- Order: Lepidoptera
- Family: Xyloryctidae
- Genus: Niphorycta
- Species: N. hypopercna

Binomial name
- Niphorycta hypopercna Meyrick, 1938

Species of moth

Niphorycta hypopercna is a moth in the family Xyloryctidae. It was described by Edward Meyrick in 1938. It is found on New Guinea.
