= Pansepta ereboglauca =

Scientific classification
- Kingdom: Animalia
- Phylum: Arthropoda
- Class: Insecta
- Order: Lepidoptera
- Family: Xyloryctidae
- Genus: Pansepta
- Species: P. ereboglauca

Binomial name
- Pansepta ereboglauca Meyrick, 1926

Species of moth

Pansepta ereboglauca is a moth in the family Xyloryctidae. It was described by Edward Meyrick in 1926. It is found on Borneo.
