= Xylomimetes trachyptera =

Scientific classification
- Domain: Eukaryota
- Kingdom: Animalia
- Phylum: Arthropoda
- Class: Insecta
- Order: Lepidoptera
- Family: Xyloryctidae
- Genus: Xylomimetes
- Species: X. trachyptera

Binomial name
- Xylomimetes trachyptera (Turner, 1900)

Synonyms
- Pilostibes trachyptera Turner, 1900

Species of moth

Xylomimetes trachyptera is a moth in the family Xyloryctidae. It was described by Alfred Jefferis Turner in 1900. It is found in Australia, where it has been recorded from Queensland.

The wingspan is about 40 mm (1.6 in). The forewings are brown whitish, suffused with reddish brown and fuscous brown, with five or six tufts of raised scales. There is a dark-fuscous oblique mark on the costa at one-fourth and paler fuscous marks on the costa at the middle, three-fourths, and two more between the last and the apex. There is also all ill-defined blackish streak in the disc above the middle, and several fine blackish streaks along the veins in the posterior portion of the disc. The hindwings are brown whitish.
