= Liparistis lioxera =

Scientific classification
- Kingdom: Animalia
- Phylum: Arthropoda
- Class: Insecta
- Order: Lepidoptera
- Family: Xyloryctidae
- Genus: Liparistis
- Species: L. lioxera

Binomial name
- Liparistis lioxera Meyrick, 1915

Species of moth

Liparistis lioxera is a moth in the family Xyloryctidae. It was described by Edward Meyrick in 1915. It is found in Australia, where it has been recorded from New South Wales.

The wingspan is 10–11 mm. The forewings are pale ochreous with the costa suffused with white from the base to two-thirds. The hindwings are pale grey.
