= Pseudoprocometis baronella =

Scientific classification
- Kingdom: Animalia
- Phylum: Arthropoda
- Class: Insecta
- Order: Lepidoptera
- Family: Xyloryctidae
- Genus: Pseudoprocometis
- Species: P. baronella

Binomial name
- Pseudoprocometis baronella Viette, 1956

Species of moth

Pseudoprocometis baronella is a moth in the family Xyloryctidae. It was described by Viette in 1956. It is found in Madagascar.
