= Athrypsiastis chionodes =

Scientific classification
- Domain: Eukaryota
- Kingdom: Animalia
- Phylum: Arthropoda
- Class: Insecta
- Order: Lepidoptera
- Family: Xyloryctidae
- Genus: Athrypsiastis
- Species: A. chionodes

Binomial name
- Athrypsiastis chionodes Diakonoff, 1954

Species of moth

Athrypsiastis chionodes is a moth in the family Xyloryctidae. It was described by Alexey Diakonoff in 1954. It is found in New Guinea.
