= Caenorycta dryoxantha =

Scientific classification
- Domain: Eukaryota
- Kingdom: Animalia
- Phylum: Arthropoda
- Class: Insecta
- Order: Lepidoptera
- Family: Xyloryctidae
- Genus: Caenorycta
- Species: C. dryoxantha

Binomial name
- Caenorycta dryoxantha Meyrick, 1922

Synonyms
- Cryptophasa mesotoma Meyrick, 1925

Species of moth

Caenorycta dryoxantha is a moth in the family Xyloryctidae. It was described by Edward Meyrick in 1922. It is found on New Guinea.

The wingspan is about 38 mm. The forewings are pale ochreous with scattered dark brown scales and a dark brown dot near the base in the middle. There is an elongate brown patch sprinkled with dark fuscous extending along the dorsum from one-fifth to four-fifths, pointed anteriorly, reaching one-third across the wing and truncate posteriorly, the upper edge with an obtuse prominence suffused with dark fuscous before the middle. There is also an indistinct median line of dark brown suffusion from near the base to the termen. The second discal stigma is linear and dark fuscous and there is some brownish tinge on the tornal area. A dark fuscous mark is found on the costa at three-fourths. The hindwings are ochreous yellow.
