= Exoditis dominiqueae =

Scientific classification
- Kingdom: Animalia
- Phylum: Arthropoda
- Class: Insecta
- Order: Lepidoptera
- Family: Xyloryctidae
- Genus: Exoditis
- Species: E. dominiqueae

Binomial name
- Exoditis dominiqueae Viette, 1955

Species of moth

Exoditis dominiqueae is a moth in the family Xyloryctidae. It was described by Pierre Viette in 1955. It is endemic to Madagascar.
