= Boydia stenadelpha =

Scientific classification
- Domain: Eukaryota
- Kingdom: Animalia
- Phylum: Arthropoda
- Class: Insecta
- Order: Lepidoptera
- Family: Xyloryctidae
- Genus: Boydia
- Species: B. stenadelpha

Binomial name
- Boydia stenadelpha (Lower, 1905)

Synonyms
- Hypertricha stenadelpha Lower, 1905

Species of moth

Boydia stenadelpha is a moth in the family Xyloryctidae. It was described by Oswald Bertram Lower in 1905. It is found in Australia, where it has been recorded from New South Wales.

The wingspan is about 20 mm. The forewings are cinerous-grey whitish with a streak of white along the fold from the base to the end of the cell, containing an oblique fuscous patch in the middle, and two or three fuscous dots on the upper half at and near the extremity. The hindwings are pale grey whitish, somewhat fuscous tinged around the apex.
