= Paralecta tinctoria =

Scientific classification
- Kingdom: Animalia
- Phylum: Arthropoda
- Class: Insecta
- Order: Lepidoptera
- Family: Xyloryctidae
- Genus: Paralecta
- Species: P. tinctoria

Binomial name
- Paralecta tinctoria (T. P. Lucas, 1894)

Synonyms
- Xylorycta tinctoria T. P. Lucas, 1894

Species of moth

Paralecta tinctoria is a moth in the family Xyloryctidae. It was described by Thomas Pennington Lucas in 1894. It is found in Australia, where it has been recorded from Queensland.

The wingspan is 24–26 mm. The forewings are creamy white, the costa light, with a patch near the base reddish grey, a patch on the inner margin in the second and third fourth ferruginous red, more or less suffused or tinted into ground colour toward the costa at the apex. There is a fine inconspicuous line at three-fourths. The hindwings are creamy white.
