= Caenorycta plutotera =

Scientific classification
- Domain: Eukaryota
- Kingdom: Animalia
- Phylum: Arthropoda
- Class: Insecta
- Order: Lepidoptera
- Family: Xyloryctidae
- Genus: Caenorycta
- Species: C. plutotera

Binomial name
- Caenorycta plutotera (Diakonoff, 1966)

Synonyms
- Coenorycta plutotera Diakonoff, 1966

Species of moth

Caenorycta plutotera is a moth in the family Xyloryctidae. It was described by Alexey Diakonoff in 1966. It is found in New Guinea.
