= Paralecta hexagona =

Scientific classification
- Domain: Eukaryota
- Kingdom: Animalia
- Phylum: Arthropoda
- Class: Insecta
- Order: Lepidoptera
- Family: Xyloryctidae
- Genus: Paralecta
- Species: P. hexagona

Binomial name
- Paralecta hexagona Diakonoff, 1954

Species of moth

Paralecta hexagona is a moth in the family Xyloryctidae. It was discovered by entomologist Alexey Diakonoff in 1954. It is found in New Guinea.
