= Heterochyta asteropa =

Scientific classification
- Domain: Eukaryota
- Kingdom: Animalia
- Phylum: Arthropoda
- Class: Insecta
- Order: Lepidoptera
- Family: Xyloryctidae
- Genus: Heterochyta
- Species: H. asteropa

Binomial name
- Heterochyta asteropa Meyrick, 1906

Species of moth

Heterochyta asteropa is a moth in the family Xyloryctidae. It was described by Edward Meyrick in 1906. It is found in Australia, where it has been recorded from Queensland.

== Description ==
The wingspan is about 33 mm. The forewings are fuscous, very finely sprinkled with whitish points, with some scattered whitish scales. The discal stigmata are ochreous white. The hindwings are pale grey.
