= Pseudoprocometis helle =

Scientific classification
- Kingdom: Animalia
- Phylum: Arthropoda
- Class: Insecta
- Order: Lepidoptera
- Family: Xyloryctidae
- Genus: Pseudoprocometis
- Species: P. helle

Binomial name
- Pseudoprocometis helle Viette, 1952

Species of moth

Pseudoprocometis helle is a moth in the family Xyloryctidae. It was described by Viette in 1952. It is found in Madagascar.
