= Chereuta tinthalea =

Scientific classification
- Kingdom: Animalia
- Phylum: Arthropoda
- Clade: Pancrustacea
- Class: Insecta
- Order: Lepidoptera
- Family: Xyloryctidae
- Genus: Chereuta
- Species: C. tinthalea

Binomial name
- Chereuta tinthalea Meyrick, 1906

Synonyms
- Amphimelas argopasta Turner, 1929

Species of moth

Chereuta tinthalea is a moth in the family Xyloryctidae. It was described by Edward Meyrick in 1906. It is found in Australia, where it has been recorded from the Australian Capital Territory and New South Wales.

The wingspan is 12–13 mm.
