= Crypsicharis enthetica =

Scientific classification
- Kingdom: Animalia
- Phylum: Arthropoda
- Clade: Pancrustacea
- Class: Insecta
- Order: Lepidoptera
- Family: Xyloryctidae
- Genus: Crypsicharis
- Species: C. enthetica

Binomial name
- Crypsicharis enthetica Meyrick, 1922

Species of moth

Crypsicharis enthetica is a moth in the family Xyloryctidae. It was described by Edward Meyrick in 1922. It is found in Australia, where it has been recorded from Queensland.

Their wingspan is about 22 mm. Their forewings are white, sprinkled with light ochreous brown except along the costa, the dorsal half tinged whitish ochreous, the dorsal area beneath the fold more thickly irrorated (sprinkled) with light brown. The plical and second discal stigmata form small brown spots and there is a thick inwards-oblique brown streak from the dorsum at two-thirds nearly to the middle of the disc, rather expanded on the dorsum. A marginal series of brown dots is found around the apex and termen. The hindwings are whitish grey ochreous.
