= Exoditis subfurcata =

Scientific classification
- Kingdom: Animalia
- Phylum: Arthropoda
- Class: Insecta
- Order: Lepidoptera
- Family: Xyloryctidae
- Genus: Exoditis
- Species: E. subfurcata

Binomial name
- Exoditis subfurcata Meyrick, 1933

Species of moth

Exoditis subfurcata is a moth in the family Xyloryctidae. It was described by Edward Meyrick in 1933. It is endemic to Madagascar.

The wingspan is 17 mm (0.67 in) in the type series (a male and a female).
