= Microphidias =

Scientific classification
- Domain: Eukaryota
- Kingdom: Animalia
- Phylum: Arthropoda
- Class: Insecta
- Order: Lepidoptera
- Family: Xyloryctidae
- Genus: Microphidias; Meyrick, 1937
- Species: M. bacteriopis

Binomial name
- Microphidias bacteriopis Meyrick, 1937

Monotypic moth genus in family Xyloryctidae

Microphidias bacteriopis is a moth in the family Xyloryctidae, and the only species in the genus Microphidias. The species and genus were both described by Edward Meyrick in 1937 and are found in South Africa.

The wingspan is about 15 mm.
