= Mystacernis =

Scientific classification
- Kingdom: Animalia
- Phylum: Arthropoda
- Class: Insecta
- Order: Lepidoptera
- Family: Xyloryctidae
- Genus: Mystacernis; Meyrick, 1915
- Species: M. alphesta

Binomial name
- Mystacernis alphesta Meyrick, 1915

Monotypic moth genus in family Xyloryctidae

Mystacernis alphesta is a moth in the family Xyloryctidae, and the only species in the genus Mystacernis. The genus and species were both described by Edward Meyrick in 1915 and are found in Malawi.

The wingspan is about 11 mm. The fore wings are brownish ochreous diffusely irrorated with fuscous. The discal stigmata are cloudy and dark fuscous, connected by pale ochreous suffusion. The hindwings are pale grey.
