= Phracyps =

Scientific classification
- Domain: Eukaryota
- Kingdom: Animalia
- Phylum: Arthropoda
- Class: Insecta
- Order: Lepidoptera
- Family: Xyloryctidae
- Subfamily: Xyloryctinae
- Genus: Phracyps; Viette, 1952

Moth genus in family Xyloryctidae

Phracyps is a genus of moths of the family Xyloryctidae from the Madagascar.

== Species ==
- Phracyps lebisella Viette, 1955
- Phracyps longifasciella Viette, 1955
- Phracyps waterloti Viette, 1952
