= Anoecea =

Scientific classification
- Kingdom: Animalia
- Phylum: Arthropoda
- Class: Insecta
- Order: Lepidoptera
- Family: Xyloryctidae
- Genus: Anoecea; Diakonoff, 1951
- Species: A. trigonophora

Binomial name
- Anoecea trigonophora Diakonoff, 1951

Monotypic moth genus in family Xyloryctidae

Anoecea trigonophora is a moth in the family Xyloryctidae, and the only species in the genus Anoecea. It was described by Alexey Diakonoff in 1951 and is found in Burma.
