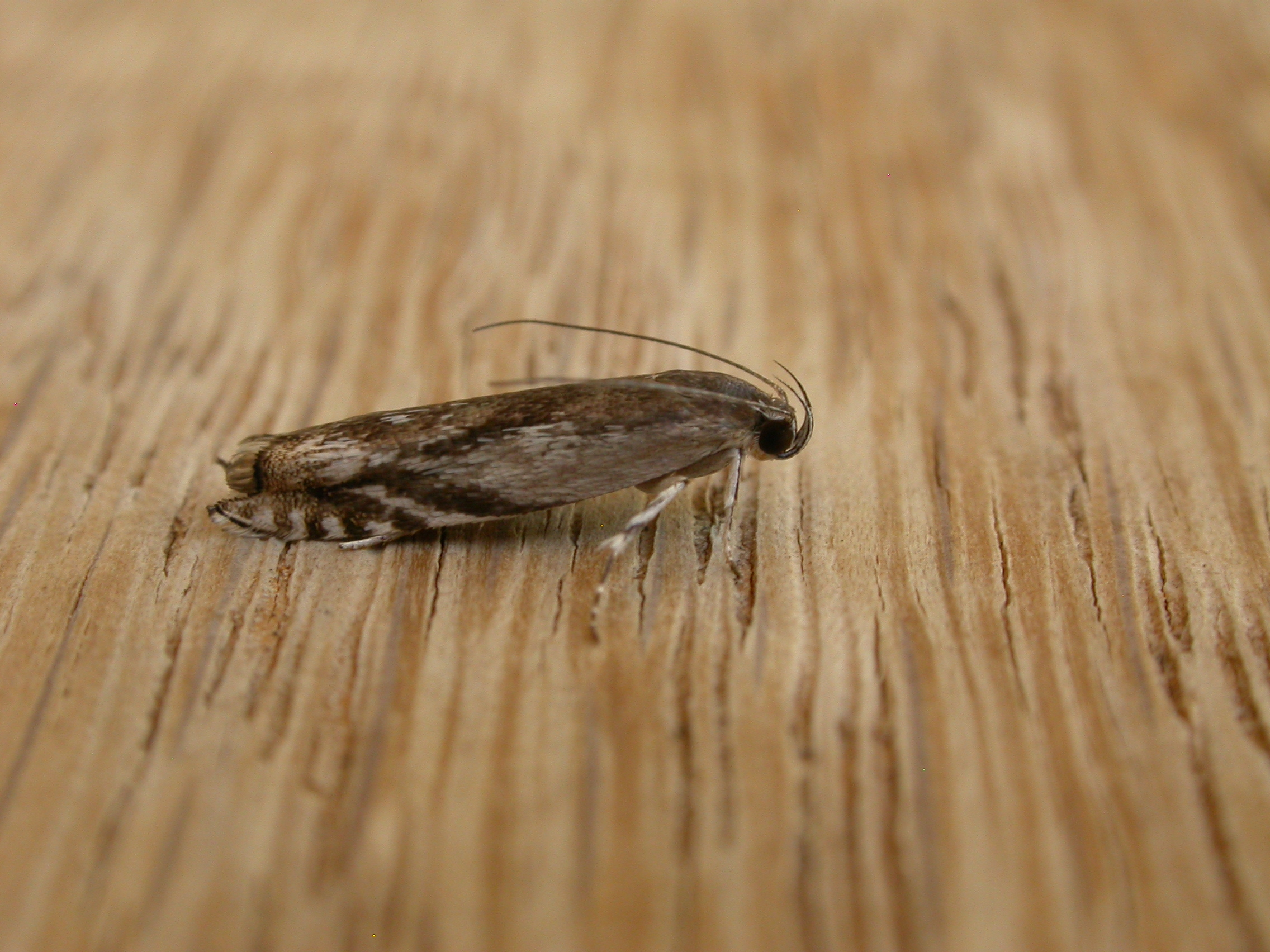
- Iulactis sp. to MV light

Scientific classification
- Kingdom: Animalia
- Phylum: Arthropoda
- Class: Insecta
- Order: Lepidoptera
- Family: Xyloryctidae
- Genus: Iulactis; Meyrick, 1918

= Iulactis =

Moth genus in family Xyloryctidae

Iulactis is a genus of moths of the family Xyloryctidae.

== Species ==
- Iulactis insignis (Meyrick, 1904)
- Iulactis semifusca Meyrick, 1918
