= Cyanocrates =

Scientific classification
- Domain: Eukaryota
- Kingdom: Animalia
- Phylum: Arthropoda
- Class: Insecta
- Order: Lepidoptera
- Family: Xyloryctidae
- Genus: Cyanocrates; Meyrick, 1925

Synonyms
- Ommatothelxis Druce, 1912

Moth genus in family Xyloryctidae

Cyanocrates is a genus of moths of the family Xyloryctidae.

== Species ==
- Cyanocrates inventrix Meyrick, 1925
- Cyanocrates grandis (Druce, 1912)
