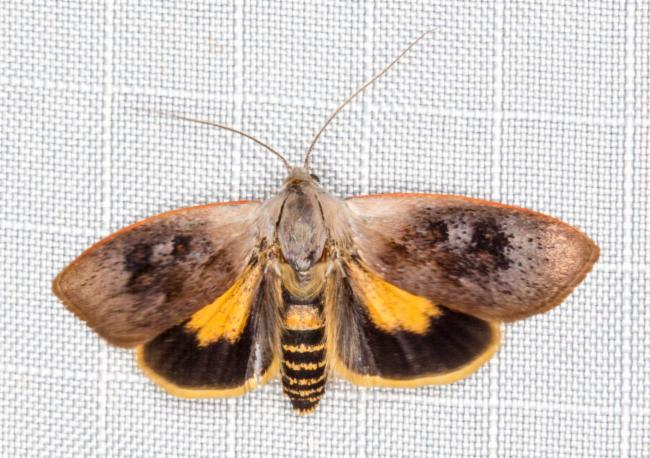
- Brachybelistis pentachroa

Scientific classification
- Kingdom: Animalia
- Phylum: Arthropoda
- Class: Insecta
- Order: Lepidoptera
- Family: Xyloryctidae
- Genus: Brachybelistis; Turner, 1902

= Brachybelistis =

Moth genus in family Xyloryctidae

Brachybelistis is a genus of moths of the family Xyloryctidae.

== Species ==
- Brachybelistis blackburnii (Lower, 1892)
- Brachybelistis neomorpha (Turner, 1898)
- Brachybelistis pentachroa (Lower, 1901)
