= Pansepta =

Scientific classification
- Kingdom: Animalia
- Phylum: Arthropoda
- Class: Insecta
- Order: Lepidoptera
- Family: Xyloryctidae
- Genus: Pansepta; Meyrick, 1915

Species
- See text

Moth genus in family Xyloryctidae

Pansepta is a genus of moths of the family Xyloryctidae.

== Species ==
The genus includes the following species:

- Pansepta amoerocera Diakonoff, 1954
- Pansepta ereboglauca Meyrick, 1926
- Pansepta hierophanes Meyrick, 1925
- Pansepta languescens Diakonoff, 1954
- Pansepta splendens Diakonoff, 1954
- Pansepta tactica Diakonoff, 1954
- Pansepta teleturga Meyrick, 1915
- Pansepta tunsa Diakonoff, 1954
