= Ghuryx =

Scientific classification
- Kingdom: Animalia
- Phylum: Arthropoda
- Class: Insecta
- Order: Lepidoptera
- Family: Xyloryctidae
- Genus: Ghuryx; Viette, 1956

Moth genus in family Xyloryctidae

Ghuryx is a genus of moths of the family Xyloryctidae.

== Species ==
- Ghuryx malagasella Viette, 1985
- Ghuryx perinetella Viette, 1956
- Ghuryx venosella Viette, 1956
