= Clepsigenes =

Scientific classification
- Kingdom: Animalia
- Phylum: Arthropoda
- Class: Insecta
- Order: Lepidoptera
- Family: Xyloryctidae
- Genus: Clepsigenes; Meyrick, 1930
- Species: C. dissota

Binomial name
- Clepsigenes dissota Meyrick, 1930

Monotypic moth genus in family Xyloryctidae

Clepsigenes dissota is a moth in the family Xyloryctidae, and the only species in the genus Clepsigenes. The genus and species were both described by Edward Meyrick in 1930 and are found in New Guinea.
