= Bassarodes =

Scientific classification
- Kingdom: Animalia
- Phylum: Arthropoda
- Class: Insecta
- Order: Lepidoptera
- Family: Xyloryctidae
- Genus: Bassarodes; Meyrick, 1910
- Species: B. siriaca

Binomial name
- Bassarodes siriaca Meyrick, 1910

Monotypic moth genus in family Xyloryctidae

Bassarodes is a monotypic moth genus in the family Xyloryctidae. Its only species, Bassarodes siriaca, is found on the Solomon Islands. Both the genus and species were first described by Edward Meyrick in 1910.

The wingspan is 23–30 mm. The forewings of the males are pale yellowish, sometimes suffused with pale brownish on the veins and margins, with the second discal stigma dark brown, an oblique patch of brown suffusion between this and the apex, and sometimes a streak of dark brown suffusion along the fold curved upwards beneath the middle of the wing. The female forewings are pale ochreous suffusedly irrorated (sprinkled) with dark brown, with a broad longitudinal median dark fuscous band, suffused and undefined towards the costa, the lower margin well marked and pale edged, curved downwards on the anterior half and upwards beyond the middle, terminating in the tornus. The hindwings of the males are light yellowish, sometimes sprinkled with fuscous towards the tornus. The hindwings of the females are fuscous.
