= Malacognostis =

Scientific classification
- Kingdom: Animalia
- Phylum: Arthropoda
- Class: Insecta
- Order: Lepidoptera
- Family: Xyloryctidae
- Genus: Malacognostis; Meyrick, 1926
- Species: M. termatias

Binomial name
- Malacognostis termatias Meyrick, 1926

Monotypic moth genus in family Xyloryctidae

Malacognostis termatias is a moth in the family Xyloryctidae, and the only species in the genus Malacognostis. The genus and species were described by Edward Meyrick in 1926 and are found on Borneo.

The wingspan is about 29 mm. The forewings are glossy white with a terminal series of slight elongate dark grey marks. The hindwings are white.
