= Cyphoryctis =

Scientific classification
- Kingdom: Animalia
- Phylum: Arthropoda
- Class: Insecta
- Order: Lepidoptera
- Family: Xyloryctidae
- Genus: Cyphoryctis; Meyrick, 1934
- Species: C. xylodoma

Binomial name
- Cyphoryctis xylodoma Meyrick, 1934

Monotypic moth genus in family Xyloryctidae

Cyphoryctis xylodoma is a moth in the family Xyloryctidae, and the only species in the genus Cyphoryctis. The species and genus both were described by Edward Meyrick in 1934 and are found in Tanzania.
