= Gemorodes =

Scientific classification
- Domain: Eukaryota
- Kingdom: Animalia
- Phylum: Arthropoda
- Class: Insecta
- Order: Lepidoptera
- Family: Xyloryctidae
- Genus: Gemorodes; Meyrick, 1925

Moth genus in family Xyloryctidae

Gemorodes is a genus of moths of the family Xyloryctidae.

== Species ==
- Gemorodes delphinopa Meyrick, 1930
- Gemorodes diclera Meyrick, 1925
