= Chereuta =

Scientific classification
- Domain: Eukaryota
- Kingdom: Animalia
- Phylum: Arthropoda
- Class: Insecta
- Order: Lepidoptera
- Family: Xyloryctidae
- Genus: Chereuta; Meyrick, 1906

Synonyms
- Amphimelas Turner, 1929

Moth genus in family Xyloryctidae

Chereuta is a genus of moths of the family Xyloryctidae.

== Species ==
- Chereuta anthracistis Meyrick, 1906
- Chereuta chalcistis Meyrick, 1906
- Chereuta tinthalea Meyrick, 1906
