= Chironeura =

Scientific classification
- Kingdom: Animalia
- Phylum: Arthropoda
- Clade: Pancrustacea
- Class: Insecta
- Order: Lepidoptera
- Family: Xyloryctidae
- Genus: Chironeura; Diakonoff, 1954
- Species: C. chrysocyma

Binomial name
- Chironeura chrysocyma Diakonoff, 1954

Monotypic moth genus in family Xyloryctidae

Chironeura chrysocyma is a moth in the family Xyloryctidae, and the only species in the genus Chironeura. Species and genus were both described by Alexey Diakonoff in 1954 and are found New Guinea.
