= Xylodryadella =

Scientific classification
- Kingdom: Animalia
- Phylum: Arthropoda
- Clade: Pancrustacea
- Class: Insecta
- Order: Lepidoptera
- Family: Xyloryctidae
- Genus: Xylodryadella; T. B. Fletcher, 1940
- Species: X. cryeranthes

Binomial name
- Xylodryadella cryeranthes (Meyrick, 1925)

Synonyms
- Xylodryas Meyrick, 1925 (preocc. Turner, 1922); Xylodryas cryeranthes Meyrick, 1925

Monotypic moth genus in family Xyloryctidae

Xylodryadella is a monotypic moth genus in the family Xyloryctidae described by Thomas Bainbrigge Fletcher in 1940. Its only species, Xylodryadella cryeranthes, was described by Edward Meyrick in 1925 and is found in New Guinea.

The wingspan is about 31 mm. The forewings are rather light brown, with some scattered, blackish scales, the veins partially marked with black streaks and the costa slenderly blackish from the base to beyond the middle, with four irregular projections or thickenings, beneath this irregular whitish suffusion extended as a costal patch to three-fourths and then beneath the costa to near the apex. Some black suffusion is found on the bases of veins 10 and 11 and there are three small blackish spots on the costa towards the apex. The hindwings are light fuscous.
