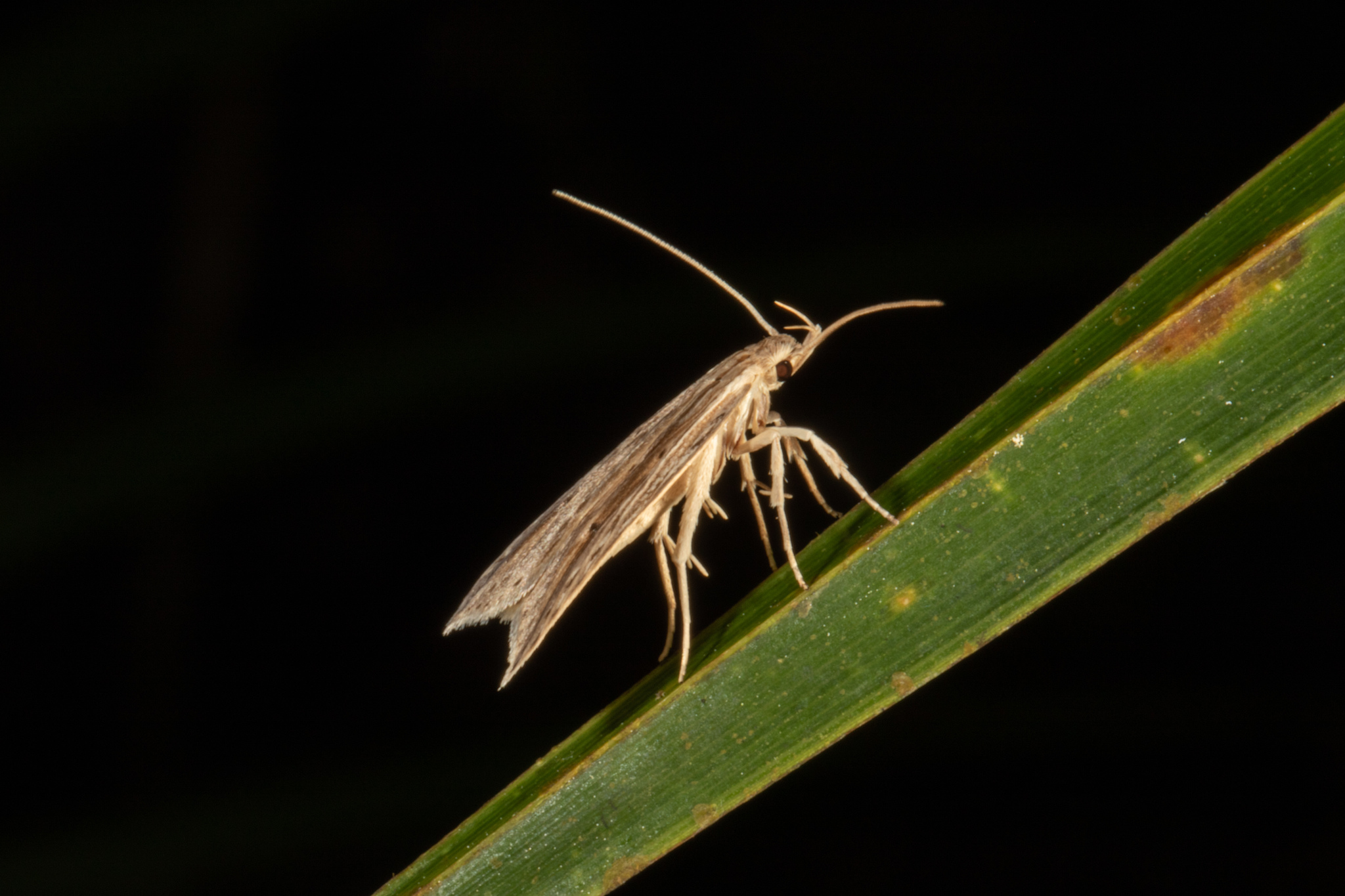

Scientific classification
- Domain: Eukaryota
- Kingdom: Animalia
- Phylum: Arthropoda
- Class: Insecta
- Order: Lepidoptera
- Family: Xyloryctidae
- Genus: Donacostola; Meyrick, 1931
- Species: D. notabilis

Binomial name
- Donacostola notabilis (Philpott, 1928)

Synonyms
- Euprionocera notabilis Philpott, 1928

= Donacostola =

Monotypic moth genus in family Xyloryctidae

Donacostola notabilis is a species of moth in the family Xyloryctidae, and the only species in the genus Donacostola. The species was described by Alfred Philpott in 1928; the genus established by Edward Meyrick in 1931. The species is endemic to New Zealand.

The wingspan is 34–37 mm. The forewings are whitish-ochreous with brown markings. There is a fairly broad but indistinct median stripe from the base to the apex and a very obscure narrow streak along the dorsum to near the tornus. The first discal spot is minute and the plical spot is obsolete. The second discal is large and round. There is subterminal and terminal series of hardly perceptible dots. The hindwings are shining ochreous-white.
