= Pseudoprocometis =

Scientific classification
- Kingdom: Animalia
- Phylum: Arthropoda
- Class: Insecta
- Order: Lepidoptera
- Family: Xyloryctidae
- Genus: Pseudoprocometis; Viette, 1952

Moth genus in family Xyloryctidae

Pseudoprocometis is a genus of moths of the family Xyloryctidae.

== Species ==
- Pseudoprocometis baronella Viette, 1956
- Pseudoprocometis helle Viette, 1952
- Pseudoprocometis robletella Viette, 1956
