= Heterochyta =

Scientific classification
- Domain: Eukaryota
- Kingdom: Animalia
- Phylum: Arthropoda
- Class: Insecta
- Order: Lepidoptera
- Family: Xyloryctidae
- Genus: Heterochyta; Meyrick, 1906

Synonyms
- Macrobela Turner, 1947 (preocc. Turner, 1939)

Moth genus in family Xyloryctidae

Heterochyta is a genus of moths of the family Xyloryctidae.

== Species ==
- Heterochyta aprepta (Turner, 1947)
- Heterochyta asteropa Meyrick, 1906
- Heterochyta infesta (Meyrick, 1921)
- Heterochyta pyrotypa Common, 1996
- Heterochyta tetracentra (Meyrick, 1906)
- Heterochyta xenomorpha Meyrick, 1906
