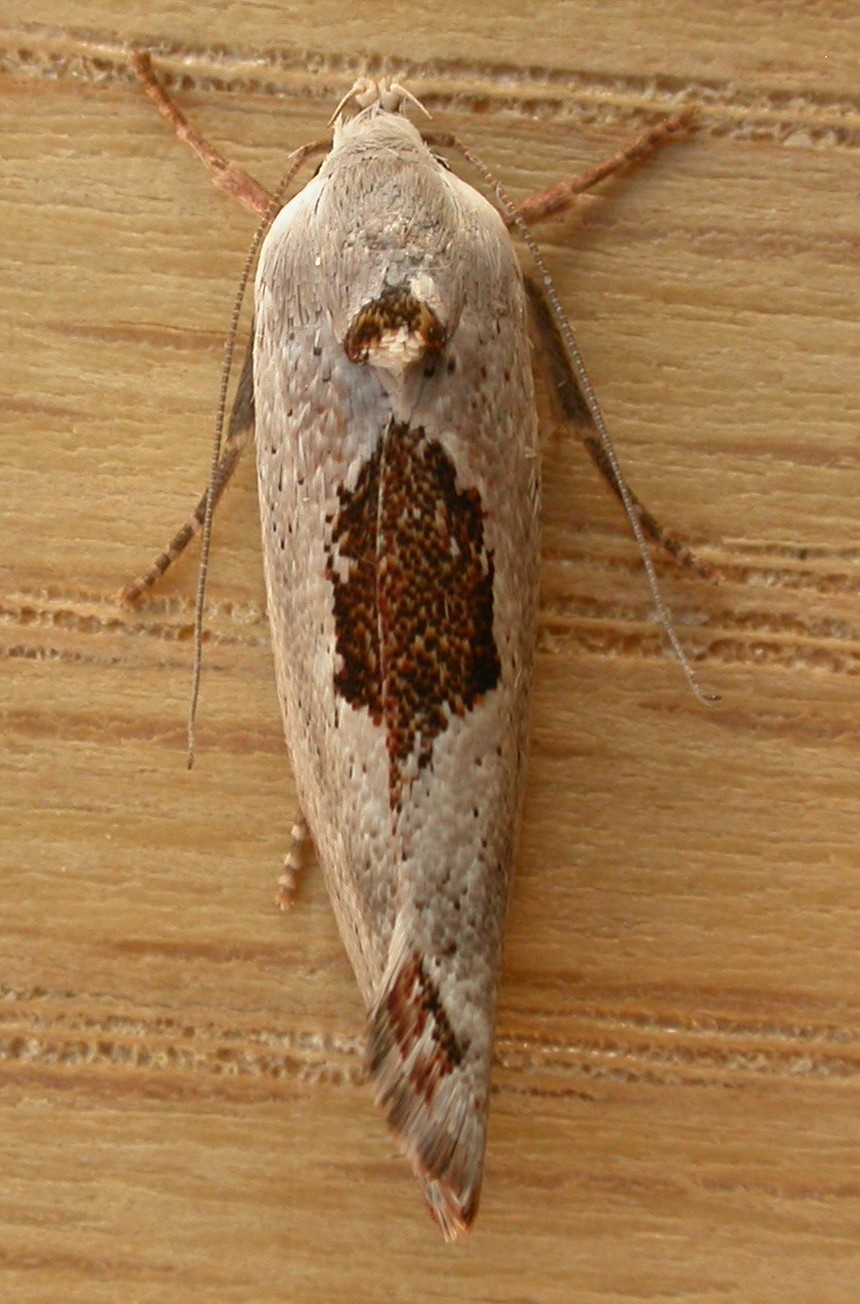

Scientific classification
- Kingdom: Animalia
- Phylum: Arthropoda
- Clade: Pancrustacea
- Class: Insecta
- Order: Lepidoptera
- Family: Xyloryctidae
- Genus: Tymbophora; Meyrick, 1890
- Species: T. peltastis

Binomial name
- Tymbophora peltastis Meyrick, 1850

= Tymbophora =

Monotypic moth genus in family Xyloryctidae

Tymbophora is a monotypic genus of moth in the family Xyloryctidae. Its sole species is Tymbophora peltastis, which is found in most of Australia.

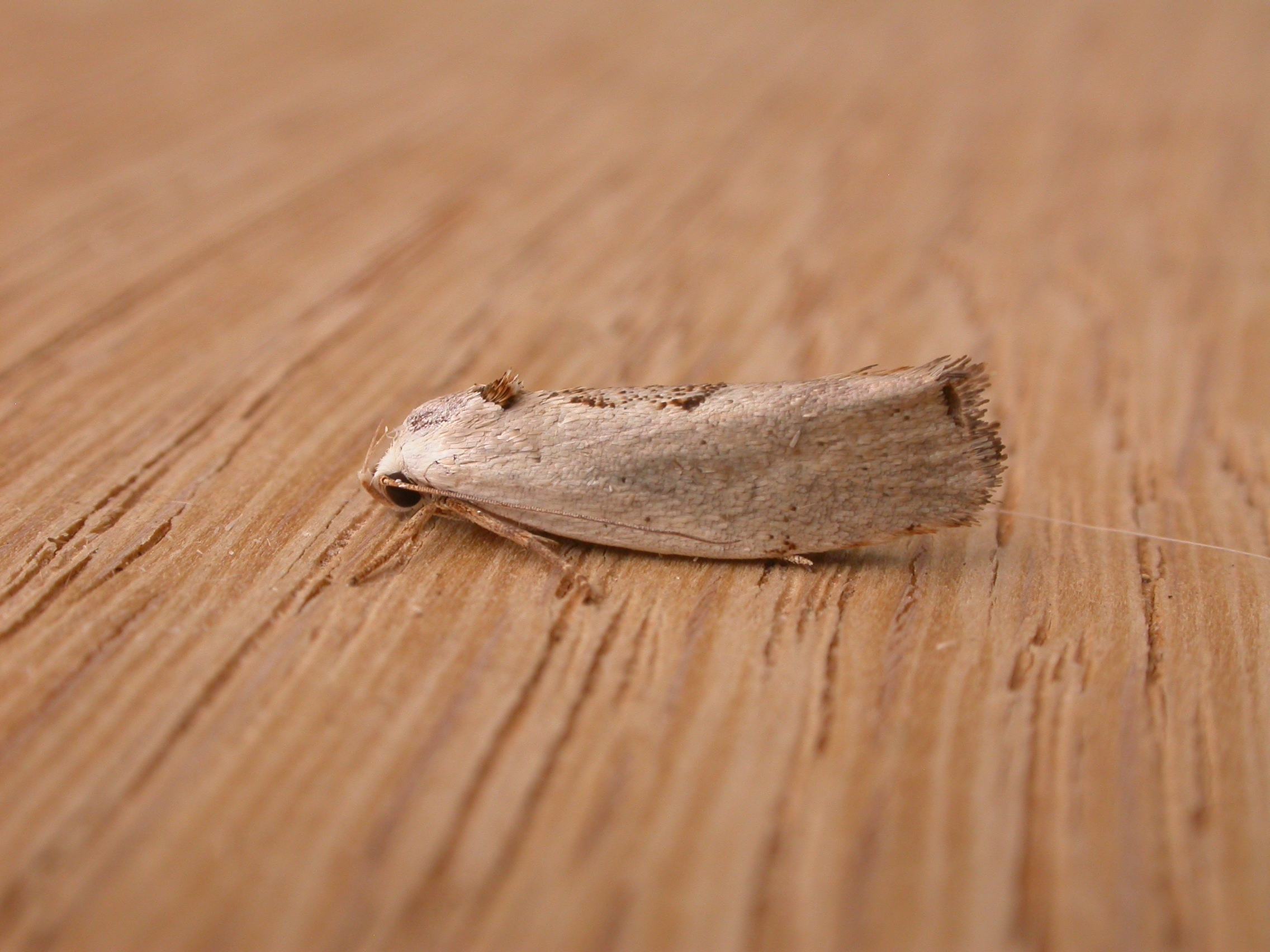

T. peltastis has a wingspan of 19–27 mm. The forewings are very pale whitish-ochreous, with fine scattered black or brownish scales, more or less tinged or suffused with pale fuscous except towards the anterior half of the costa, sometimes very faintly. There is a trapezoidal deep brown-red blotch, irrorated with black and a few ochreous-whitish scales, extending on the inner margin from one-third to three-fourths, narrowed upwards, the upper side flat, not reaching half across the wing. There are also three or four brownish dots on the posterior half of the costa. The hindwings are fuscous-grey, more or less suffused with pale whitish-ochreous anteriorly.

The larvae feed on Eucalyptus polyanthemos and Angophora costata, webbing green leaves with silk and beneath the bark.
