= Acompsogma =

Scientific classification
- Kingdom: Animalia
- Phylum: Arthropoda
- Clade: Pancrustacea
- Class: Insecta
- Order: Lepidoptera
- Family: Geometridae
- Genus: Acompsogma; Meyrick, 1938
- Species: A. dioryctis

Binomial name
- Acompsogma dioryctis Meyrick, 1938

Monotypic moth genus in family Xyloryctidae

Acompsogma is a monotypic moth genus in the family Xyloryctidae. Its only species, Acompsogma dioryctis, is found on New Guinea. Both the genus and species were first described by Edward Meyrick in 1938.
