= Capnolocha =

Scientific classification
- Kingdom: Animalia
- Phylum: Arthropoda
- Class: Insecta
- Order: Lepidoptera
- Family: Xyloryctidae
- Genus: Capnolocha; Meyrick, 1925
- Species: C. praenivalis

Binomial name
- Capnolocha praenivalis Meyrick, 1925

Genus of moths

Capnolocha is a monotypic moth genus in the family Xyloryctidae. Its only species, Capnolocha praenivalis, is found on New Guinea. Both the genus and species were first described by Edward Meyrick in 1925.

The wingspan is 25–26 mm. The forewings are dark fuscous, in males bronzy tinged and in females with a suffused white apical spot. The hindwings are grey.
