= Exoditis =

Scientific classification
- Kingdom: Animalia
- Phylum: Arthropoda
- Class: Insecta
- Order: Lepidoptera
- Family: Xyloryctidae
- Subfamily: Xyloryctinae
- Genus: Exoditis; Meyrick, 1933

Type species
- Exoditis subfurcata Meyrick, 1933

Moth genus in family Xyloryctidae

Exoditis is a genus of moths of the family Xyloryctidae from Madagascar.

== Species ==
There are six recognized species:

- Exoditis boisduvalella Viette, 1956
- Exoditis dominiqueae Viette, 1955
- Exoditis janineae Viette, 1955
- Exoditis subfurcata Meyrick, 1933
- Exoditis sylvestrella Viette, 1955
- Exoditis vadonella Viette, 1955
