= Niphorycta =

Scientific classification
- Kingdom: Animalia
- Phylum: Arthropoda
- Class: Insecta
- Order: Lepidoptera
- Family: Xyloryctidae
- Genus: Niphorycta; Meyrick, 1938

Moth genus in family Xyloryctidae

Niphorycta is a genus of moths of the family Xyloryctidae.

== Species ==
- Niphorycta hemipercna Diakonoff, 1954
- Niphorycta hypopercna Meyrick, 1938
