= Xerocrates =

Scientific classification
- Domain: Eukaryota
- Kingdom: Animalia
- Phylum: Arthropoda
- Class: Insecta
- Order: Lepidoptera
- Family: Xyloryctidae
- Genus: Xerocrates; Meyrick, 1917
- Species: X. proleuca

Binomial name
- Xerocrates proleuca (Meyrick, 1890)

Synonyms
- Cryptophaga proleuca Meyrick, 1890

Monotypic moth genus in the family Xyloryctidae

Xerocrates is a monotypic moth genus in the family Xyloryctidae. Its only species, Xerocrates proleuca, is found in Australia, where it has been recorded from South Australia, Victoria and Western Australia. Both the genus and species were first described by Edward Meyrick in 1890.

The wingspan is about 19 mm. The forewings are fuscous, towards the inner and hindmargin sprinkled with whitish and dark fuscous and with a moderate sharply marked snow-white streak along the costa from near the base to five-sixths, attenuated anteriorly to a point, beneath bordered by a broad ochreous-brown band from the base to three-fourths. There is an ill-defined small roundish dark fuscous spot beneath the middle of the disc, suffusedly margined with whitish, and a second, unmargined, in the disc at four-fifths. The hindwings are fuscous, rather darker posteriorly.
