= Bathydoxa =

Scientific classification
- Kingdom: Animalia
- Phylum: Arthropoda
- Class: Insecta
- Order: Lepidoptera
- Family: Xyloryctidae
- Genus: Bathydoxa; Turner, 1935
- Species: B. euxesta

Binomial name
- Bathydoxa euxesta Turner, 1935

Monotypic moth genus in family Xyloryctidae

Bathydoxa euxesta is a moth in the family Xyloryctidae, and the only species in the genus Bathydoxa. It was described by Turner in 1935 and is found in Australia, where it has been recorded from Queensland, New South Wales and Victoria.

The wingspan is 24–30 mm.
