= Catanomistis =

Scientific classification
- Kingdom: Animalia
- Phylum: Arthropoda
- Class: Insecta
- Order: Lepidoptera
- Family: Xyloryctidae
- Subfamily: Xyloryctinae
- Genus: Catanomistis; Meyrick, 1933
- Species: C. loxophracta

Binomial name
- Catanomistis loxophracta Meyrick, 1933

Monotypic moth genus in family Xyloryctidae

Catanomistis is a genus of moths of the family Xyloryctidae. It contains only one species, Catanomistis loxophracta, which is found in Madagascar.

The wingspan is 14 mm (0.55 in) for the holotype, a female.

== See also ==
- List of moths of Madagascar
