= Anachastis =

Scientific classification
- Kingdom: Animalia
- Phylum: Arthropoda
- Class: Insecta
- Order: Lepidoptera
- Family: Xyloryctidae
- Subfamily: Xyloryctinae
- Genus: Anachastis; Meyrick, 1911
- Species: A. digitata

Binomial name
- Anachastis digitata Meyrick, 1911

Monotypic moth genus in family Xyloryctidae

Anachastis is a genus of moths of the family Xyloryctidae from the Seychelles. It contains only one species, Anachastis digitata.

The wingspan is about 21 mm. The forewings are pale greyish-ochreous irregularly tinged with crimson-pink, with scattered brown and blackish scales. The second discal stigma is dark grey and there is a reddish-fuscous outwardly oblique streak from the dorsum before the middle, not reaching the fold, and a similar inwardly oblique streak from the tornus. The hindwings are light grey.

== See also ==
- List of moths of Seychelles
