= Crypsicharis =

Scientific classification
- Domain: Eukaryota
- Kingdom: Animalia
- Phylum: Arthropoda
- Class: Insecta
- Order: Lepidoptera
- Family: Xyloryctidae
- Genus: Crypsicharis; Meyrick, 1890

Moth genus in family Xyloryctidae

Crypsicharis is a genus of moths of the family Xyloryctidae.

== Species ==
- Crypsicharis enthetica Meyrick, 1922
- Crypsicharis neocosma Meyrick, 1890
- Crypsicharis triplaca Lower, 1923
