= Lophobela =

Scientific classification
- Domain: Eukaryota
- Kingdom: Animalia
- Phylum: Arthropoda
- Class: Insecta
- Order: Lepidoptera
- Family: Xyloryctidae
- Genus: Lophobela; Turner, 1917
- Species: L. sinuosa

Binomial name
- Lophobela sinuosa Turner, 1917

Monotypic moth genus in family Xyloryctidae

Lophobela sinuosa is a moth in the family Xyloryctidae, and the only species in the genus Lophobela. The species and genus were both described by Alfred Jefferis Turner in 1917 and are found in Australia, where it has been recorded from Queensland.

The wingspan is about 18 mm. The forewings are pale brownish-grey, the apical half beyond a line from one-third of the costa to two-thirds of the dorsum densely irrorated with white, the costal edge and a small tornal area greyish. There is a dark fuscous line from the base of the costa, soon bifurcating, one limb approaching the costa, the other median to one-fourth, turned slightly upwards at the extremity, and giving off a branch towards the dorsum from near the extremity. The hindwings are pale grey.
