= Paralecta =

Scientific classification
- Domain: Eukaryota
- Kingdom: Animalia
- Phylum: Arthropoda
- Class: Insecta
- Order: Lepidoptera
- Family: Xyloryctidae
- Genus: Paralecta; Turner, 1898

Moth genus in family Xyloryctidae

Paralecta is a genus of moths of the family Xyloryctidae.

== Species ==
- Paralecta acutangula Diakonoff, 1954
- Paralecta amplificata Meyrick, 1925
- Paralecta antistola Meyrick, 1930
- Paralecta cerocrossa Meyrick, 1938
- Paralecta chalarodes Meyrick, 1925
- Paralecta conflata Diakonoff, 1954
- Paralecta electrophanes Meyrick, 1930
- Paralecta hexagona Diakonoff, 1954
- Paralecta iocapna Meyrick, 1925
- Paralecta isopela Meyrick, 1925
- Paralecta nephelodelta Meyrick, 1930
- Paralecta rhodometallica Diakonoff, 1954
- Paralecta tinctoria (Lucas, 1894)
- Paralecta vadosa Meyrick, 1925
