= Boydia =

Scientific classification
- Kingdom: Animalia
- Phylum: Arthropoda
- Clade: Pancrustacea
- Class: Insecta
- Order: Lepidoptera
- Family: Xyloryctidae
- Genus: Boydia; Newman, 1856

Synonyms
- Hypertricha Meyrick, 1890

Moth genus in family Xyloryctidae

Boydia is a genus of moths of the family Xyloryctidae.

== Species ==
- Boydia criniferella Newman, 1856
- Boydia stenadelpha (Lower, 1905)
