= Mnarolitia =

Scientific classification
- Kingdom: Animalia
- Phylum: Arthropoda
- Class: Insecta
- Order: Lepidoptera
- Family: Xyloryctidae
- Genus: Mnarolitia; Viette, 1954

Moth genus in family Xyloryctidae

Mnarolitia is a genus of moths of the family Xyloryctidae.

== Species ==
- Mnarolitia ambreella Viette, 1967
- Mnarolitia griveaudi Viette, 1967
- Mnarolitia nectaropa (Meyrick, 1914)
- Mnarolitia paulianellum Viette, 1954
- Mnarolitia similans Viette, 1967
- Mnarolitia sylvestrella Viette, 1968
