= Gomphoscopa =

Scientific classification
- Kingdom: Animalia
- Phylum: Arthropoda
- Class: Insecta
- Order: Lepidoptera
- Family: Xyloryctidae
- Genus: Gomphoscopa; Lower, 1901
- Species: G. catoryctopsis

Binomial name
- Gomphoscopa catoryctopsis (Lower, 1893)

Synonyms
- Pachycera Lower, 1893 (preocc. Billberg, 1820); Pachycera catoryctopsis Lower, 1893

Monotypic moth genus in family Xyloryctidae

Gomphoscopa is a monotypic moth genus in the family Xyloryctidae. Its only species, Gomphoscopa catoryctopsis, is found in the Australian state of South Australia. Both the genus and species were first described by Oswald Bertram Lower in 1893.

The wingspan is 23–27 mm. The forewings are fuscous, suffusedly mixed with whitish. There is a white streak along the costa from the base to beyond the middle, attenuated posteriorly and continued to near the apex, the anterior portion containing a fine grey line, the lower portion edged with a fine black line. There is an elongate white mark in the middle of the wing, outlined with black. A thick white streak is found from the base along the fold, suffusedly continued to near the anal angle, partially edged below with a fine black line. All veins towards the hindmargin are sharply defined by black lines, the interspaces filled with white. There is also a hindmarginal row of black dots. The hindwings are grey.
