= Potniarcha =

Scientific classification
- Kingdom: Animalia
- Phylum: Arthropoda
- Class: Insecta
- Order: Lepidoptera
- Family: Xyloryctidae
- Genus: Potniarcha; Meyrick, 1917
- Species: P. hierastis

Binomial name
- Potniarcha hierastis (Meyrick, 1890)

Synonyms
- Cryptophaga hierastis Meyrick, 1890

Monotypic moth genus in family Xyloryctidae

Potniarcha hierastis is a moth in the family Xyloryctidae, and the only species in the genus Potniarcha. The species was described by Edward Meyrick in 1890 and is found in Australia, where it has been recorded from Western Australia.

The wingspan is 22–23 mm. The forewings are glossy snow-white with a narrow dark fuscous streak along the costa from before the middle to the apex, finely attenuated anteriorly, as well as a moderate dark fuscous streak along the inner margin from near the base to the anal angle. The hindwings are light fuscous, with the hindmarginal edge darker.

The larvae feed on Hakea species.
