= Athrypsiastis =

Scientific classification
- Domain: Eukaryota
- Kingdom: Animalia
- Phylum: Arthropoda
- Class: Insecta
- Order: Lepidoptera
- Family: Xyloryctidae
- Genus: Athrypsiastis; Meyrick, 1910

Synonyms
- Topiris Walker, 1863

Moth genus in family Xyloryctidae

Athrypsiastis is a genus of moths of the family Xyloryctidae. The genus was erected by Edward Meyrick in 1910.

== Species ==
- Athrypsiastis candidella (Walker, 1863)
- Athrypsiastis chionodes Diakonoff, 1954
- Athrypsiastis delicata Diakonoff, 1954
- Athrypsiastis phaeoleuca Meyrick, 1910
- Athrypsiastis rosiflora Meyrick, 1930
- Athrypsiastis salva Meyrick, 1932
- Athrypsiastis symmetra Meyrick, 1915
