= Zaphanaula =

Scientific classification
- Kingdom: Animalia
- Phylum: Arthropoda
- Class: Insecta
- Order: Lepidoptera
- Family: Xyloryctidae
- Genus: Zaphanaula; Meyrick, 1920
- Species: Z. hemileuca

Binomial name
- Zaphanaula hemileuca (Turner, 1896)

Synonyms
- Oecophora hemileuca Turner, 1896; Peltophora leucoplaca Lower, 1897; Philobota diffusa Lucas, 1901; Zaphanaula xenophila Meyrick, 1920; Antiopala moderata Turner, 1944

Monotypic moth genus in family Xyloryctidae

Zaphanaula hemileuca is a moth in the family Xyloryctidae, and the only species in the genus Zaphanaula. It was described by Alfred Jefferis Turner in 1896. It is found in Australia, where it has been recorded from Queensland.

The wingspan is 15–20 mm. The forewings are snow-white with a broad fuscous streak from the base along the costa to one-third, which then proceeds a fuscous fascia, slightly outwardly oblique, to the inner margin before the middle, its anterior edge sharply defined, the posterior edge suffused. There is a darker dot on the fold on the posterior edge of this fascia and a broad fuscous fascia from the costa near the apex, narrowing abruptly to a point at the anal angle. Between the two fasciae are some obscure fuscous markings in the costal portion of the disc and there is a fuscous spot on the hindmargin below the middle. The hindwings are grey, with the basal half whitish-ochreous.

The larvae feed on Acacia aulacocarpa.
