= Callicopris =

Scientific classification
- Kingdom: Animalia
- Phylum: Arthropoda
- Class: Insecta
- Order: Lepidoptera
- Family: Xyloryctidae
- Genus: Callicopris; Meyrick, 1938
- Species: C. cerograpta

Binomial name
- Callicopris cerograpta Meyrick, 1938

Monotypic genus of moths

Callicopris is a monotypic moth genus in the family Xyloryctidae. Its only species, Callicopris cerograpta, is found on New Guinea. Both the genus and species were first described by Edward Meyrick in 1938.
