= Psarolitia =

Scientific classification
- Kingdom: Animalia
- Phylum: Arthropoda
- Class: Insecta
- Order: Lepidoptera
- Family: Xyloryctidae
- Genus: Psarolitia; Viette, 1956

Moth genus in family Xyloryctidae

Psarolitia is a genus of moths of the family Xyloryctidae.

== Species ==
- Psarolitia albogriseella Viette, 1956
- Psarolitia ambreella Viette, 1968
