= Leptobelistis =

Scientific classification
- Kingdom: Animalia
- Phylum: Arthropoda
- Class: Insecta
- Order: Lepidoptera
- Family: Xyloryctidae
- Genus: Leptobelistis; Turner, 1902

Moth genus in family Xyloryctidae

Leptobelistis is a genus of moths of the family Xyloryctidae.

== Species ==
- Leptobelistis asemanta Turner, 1902
- Leptobelistis isthmodes (Meyrick, 1922)
