= Thysiarcha =

Scientific classification
- Kingdom: Animalia
- Phylum: Arthropoda
- Class: Insecta
- Order: Lepidoptera
- Family: Xyloryctidae
- Genus: Thysiarcha; Meyrick, 1925
- Species: T. ecclesiastis

Binomial name
- Thysiarcha ecclesiastis (Meyrick, 1887)

Synonyms
- Cryptophasa ecclesiastis Meyrick, 1887

Monotypic moth genus in family Xyloryctidae

Thysiarcha ecclesiastis is a moth in the family Xyloryctidae, and the only species in the genus Thysiarcha. It was described by Edward Meyrick in 1887. It is found in Australia, where it has been recorded from New South Wales, Queensland and Victoria.

The wingspan is about 66 mm. The forewings are shining white with a narrow coppery hindmarginal fascia, forming alternate purple and golden spots. The hindwings are shining white with a narrow coppery-purplish hindmarginal fascia.

The larvae feed on Eucalyptus gummifera. They bore in the stem of their host plant.
