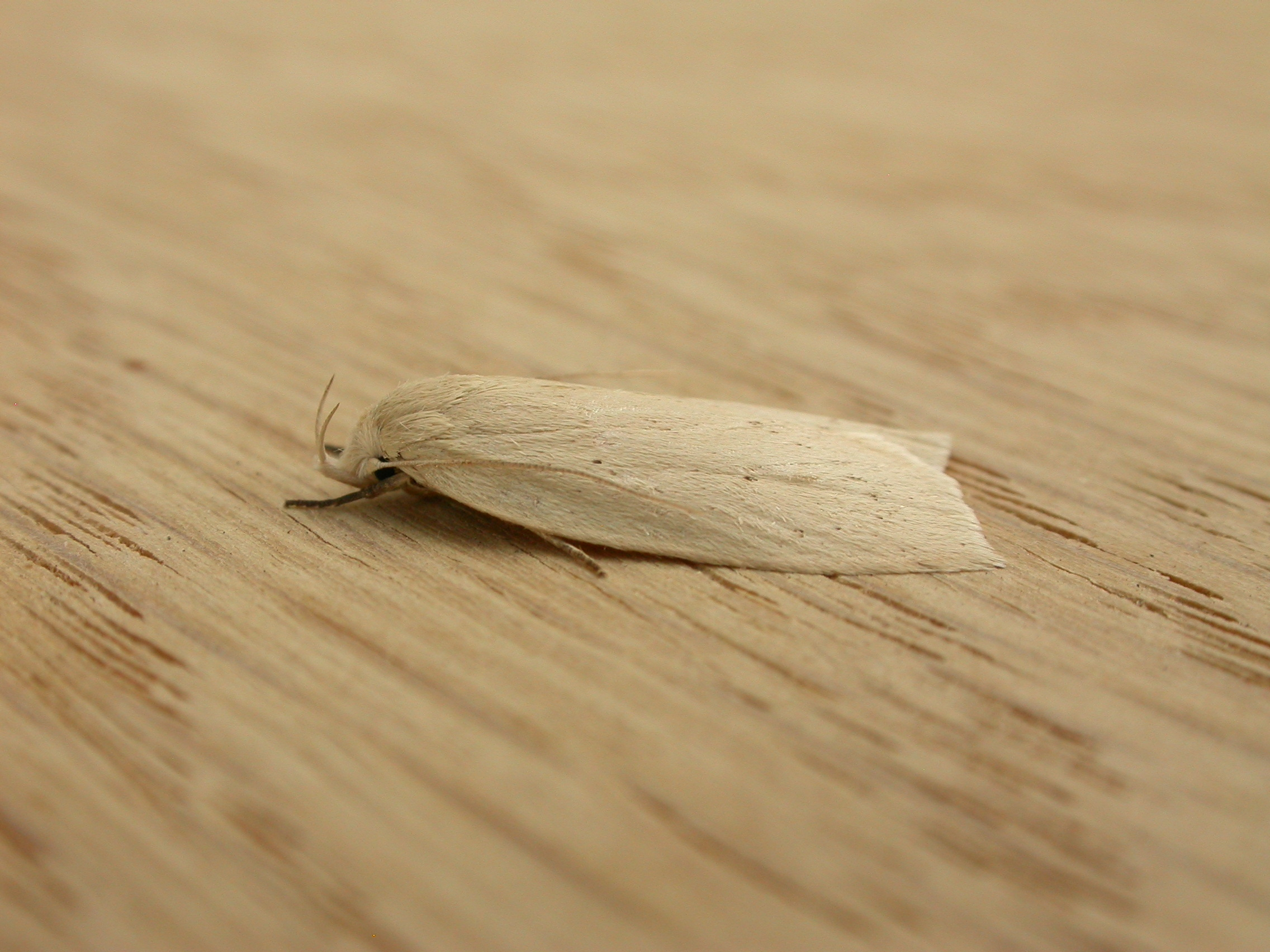
- Unidentified Hylypnes

Scientific classification
- Kingdom: Animalia
- Phylum: Arthropoda
- Clade: Pancrustacea
- Class: Insecta
- Order: Lepidoptera
- Family: Xyloryctidae
- Genus: Hylypnes; Turner, 1897

= Hylypnes =

Moth genus in family Xyloryctidae

Hylypnes is a genus of moths of the family Xyloryctidae. The members of the genus are found in eastern Australia, in New South Wales and Queensland.

== Species ==
- Hylypnes isosticha (Meyrick, 1915)
- Hylypnes pudica (Lower, 1896)
- Hylypnes leptosticta (Turner, 1947)
