= Cladophantis =

Scientific classification
- Domain: Eukaryota
- Kingdom: Animalia
- Phylum: Arthropoda
- Class: Insecta
- Order: Lepidoptera
- Family: Xyloryctidae
- Genus: Cladophantis; Meyrick, 1918

Moth genus in family Xyloryctidae

Cladophantis is a genus of moths of the family Xyloryctidae. Its species occur in Africa.

== Species ==
- Cladophantis pristina Meyrick, 1925
- Cladophantis spilozeucta Meyrick, 1927
- Cladophantis xylophracta Meyrick, 1918
