= Caenorycta =

Scientific classification
- Domain: Eukaryota
- Kingdom: Animalia
- Phylum: Arthropoda
- Class: Insecta
- Order: Lepidoptera
- Family: Xyloryctidae
- Genus: Caenorycta; Meyrick, 1922

Moth genus in family Xyloryctidae

Caenorycta is a genus of moths of the family Xyloryctidae.

== Species ==
- Caenorycta acrostega (Diakonoff, 1966)
- Caenorycta anholochrysa (Diakonoff, 1966)
- Caenorycta dryoxantha Meyrick, 1922
- Caenorycta platyleucota Meyrick, 1938
- Caenorycta plutotera (Diakonoff, 1966)
- Caenorycta thiobapta Meyrick, 1930
