= Antisclerota =

Scientific classification
- Kingdom: Animalia
- Phylum: Arthropoda
- Class: Insecta
- Order: Lepidoptera
- Family: Xyloryctidae
- Genus: Antisclerota; Meyrick, 1938
- Species: A. dicentris

Binomial name
- Antisclerota dicentris Meyrick, 1938

Monotypic moth genus in family Xyloryctidae

Antisclerota is a monotypic moth genus in the family Xyloryctidae. Its only species, Antisclerota dicentris, is found in North Kivu in the Democratic Republic of the Congo. Both the genus and species were first described by Edward Meyrick in 1938.
