= Copidoris =

Scientific classification
- Kingdom: Animalia
- Phylum: Arthropoda
- Clade: Pancrustacea
- Class: Insecta
- Order: Lepidoptera
- Family: Xyloryctidae
- Genus: Copidoris; Meyrick, 1907
- Species: C. dimorpha

Binomial name
- Copidoris dimorpha Meyrick, 1907

Monotypic moth genus in family Xyloryctidae

Copidoris dimorpha is a moth in the family Xyloryctidae, and the only species in the genus Copidoris. The genus and species were both described by Edward Meyrick in 1907 and are found in Australia, where it has been recorded from New South Wales, Queensland, Victoria and Western Australia.

The wingspan is 17–20 mm. The forewings are yellow-ochreous, along the costa, dorsum and termen, or sometimes wholly suffused with rather dark fuscous irrorated with white and usually with a clear white median longitudinal streak from the base to the apex, but sometimes this is suffusedly mixed with fuscous. The hindwings are grey-whitish, becoming light grey posteriorly.
