= Arsirrhyncha =

Scientific classification
- Kingdom: Animalia
- Phylum: Arthropoda
- Class: Insecta
- Order: Lepidoptera
- Family: Xyloryctidae
- Genus: Arsirrhyncha; Meyrick, 1938
- Species: A. fibriculata

Binomial name
- Arsirrhyncha fibriculata Meyrick, 1938

Monotypic moth genus in family Xyloryctidae

Arsirrhyncha is a monotypic moth genus in the family Xyloryctidae. Its only species, Arsirrhyncha fibriculata, is found in the former Orientale Province of the Democratic Republic of the Congo. Both the genus and species were first described by Edward Meyrick in 1938.
