= Paraclada =

Scientific classification
- Domain: Eukaryota
- Kingdom: Animalia
- Phylum: Arthropoda
- Class: Insecta
- Order: Lepidoptera
- Family: Xyloryctidae
- Genus: Paraclada; Meyrick, 1911
- Species: P. tricapna

Binomial name
- Paraclada tricapna Meyrick, 1911

Monotypic moth genus in family Xyloryctidae

Paraclada tricapna is a moth in the family Xyloryctidae, and the only species in the genus Paraclada. Genus and species were both described by Edward Meyrick in 1911 and are found on the Seychelles (Silhouette, North).

The wingspan is about 17 mm. The forewings are pale greyish-ochreous, sprinkled with light grey or fuscous and with three spots of dark grey suffusion on the costa at one-fifth, two-fifths and two-thirds, the first smallest. The plical stigma is faint and brownish, the second discal indicated by a small brownish tuft of scales. The hindwings are pale whitish-grey.
