= Anoditica =

Scientific classification
- Kingdom: Animalia
- Phylum: Arthropoda
- Class: Insecta
- Order: Lepidoptera
- Family: Geometridae
- Genus: Anoditica; Meyrick, 1938

Moth genus in family Xyloryctidae

Anoditica is a genus of moths of the family Xyloryctidae.

== Species ==
- Anoditica autopa Meyrick, 1938
- Anoditica concretella Viette, 1956
