= Xylomimetes =

Scientific classification
- Kingdom: Animalia
- Phylum: Arthropoda
- Class: Insecta
- Order: Lepidoptera
- Family: Xyloryctidae
- Genus: Xylomimetes; Turner, 1916

Moth genus in family Xyloryctidae

Xylomimetes is a genus of moths of the family Xyloryctidae.

== Species ==
- Xylomimetes scholastis Turner, 1916
- Xylomimetes trachyptera (Turner, 1900)
