= Eupetochira =

Scientific classification
- Kingdom: Animalia
- Phylum: Arthropoda
- Class: Insecta
- Order: Lepidoptera
- Family: Xyloryctidae
- Genus: Eupetochira; Meyrick, 1917

Moth genus in family Xyloryctidae

Eupetochira is a genus of moths of the family Xyloryctidae.

== Species ==
- Eupetochira axysta Meyrick, 1927
- Eupetochira xystopala (Meyrick, 1908)
