= Epidiopteryx =

Scientific classification
- Kingdom: Animalia
- Phylum: Arthropoda
- Class: Insecta
- Order: Lepidoptera
- Family: Xyloryctidae
- Genus: Epidiopteryx; Rebel in Rebel & Zerny, 1916
- Species: E. bipunctella

Binomial name
- Epidiopteryx bipunctella Rebel, 1916

Monotypic moth genus in family Xyloryctidae

Epidiopteryx bipunctella is a moth in the family Xyloryctidae, and the only species in the genus Epidiopteryx. The genus and species were both described by Hans Rebel in 1916 and are found in Sudan.
