= Sphalerostola =

Scientific classification
- Kingdom: Animalia
- Phylum: Arthropoda
- Class: Insecta
- Order: Lepidoptera
- Family: Xyloryctidae
- Genus: Sphalerostola; Meyrick, 1927

Synonyms
- Exapateter Turner, 1947

Moth genus in family Xyloryctidae

Sphalerostola is a genus of moth in the family Xyloryctidae.

== Species ==
- Sphalerostola argobela Meyrick, 1931
- Sphalerostola epierana (Turner, 1947)
- Sphalerostola caustogramma Meyrick, 1927
