= Philarista porphyrinella =

Scientific classification
- Kingdom: Animalia
- Phylum: Arthropoda
- Class: Insecta
- Order: Lepidoptera
- Family: Xyloryctidae
- Genus: Philarista; Meyrick, 1917
- Species: P. porphyrinella

Binomial name
- Philarista porphyrinella (Walker, 1864)

Synonyms
- Cryptolechia porphyrinella Walker, 1864; Xylorycta porphyrinella; Telecrates porphyrinella; Brunia intersecta T.P. Lucas, 1890

Species of moth

Philarista porphyrinella is a moth of the family Xyloryctidae. It is found from southern Queensland to southern New South Wales, where it occurs both inland and near the coast.

The wingspan is about 32 mm. The forewings are creamy-ochreous with a purplish dark grey band from the costal half of the base of wing. The hindwings are yellow-ochreous, the hindmargin black with short fine transverse black lines.

Larvae have been recorded tunnelling the stems of Exocarpos cupressiformis.
