= Prothamnodes =

Scientific classification
- Domain: Eukaryota
- Kingdom: Animalia
- Phylum: Arthropoda
- Class: Insecta
- Order: Lepidoptera
- Family: Xyloryctidae
- Genus: Prothamnodes; Meyrick, 1923

Moth genus in family Xyloryctidae

Prothamnodes is a genus of moths in the family Xyloryctidae.

== Species ==
- Prothamnodes platycycla Meyrick, 1923 (from Myanmar)
- Prothamnodes bathocentrella Viette, 1968 (from Madagascar)
