= Liparistis =

Scientific classification
- Domain: Eukaryota
- Kingdom: Animalia
- Phylum: Arthropoda
- Class: Insecta
- Order: Lepidoptera
- Family: Xyloryctidae
- Genus: Liparistis; Meyrick, 1915

Moth genus in family Xyloryctidae

Liparistis is a genus of moths of the family Xyloryctidae.

== Species ==
- Liparistis lioxera Meyrick, 1915
- Liparistis monosema (Lower, 1893)
