= Phthonerodes =

Scientific classification
- Domain: Eukaryota
- Kingdom: Animalia
- Phylum: Arthropoda
- Class: Insecta
- Order: Lepidoptera
- Family: Xyloryctidae
- Genus: Phthonerodes; Meyrick, 1890

Synonyms
- Psilosceles Turner, 1939

Moth genus in family Xyloryctidae

Phthonerodes is a genus of moths of the family Xyloryctidae.

== Species ==
- Phthonerodes anthracopsara Diakonoff, 1954
- Phthonerodes aristaepennis Diakonoff, 1954
- Phthonerodes cryptoleuca Diakonoff, 1954
- Phthonerodes peridela Common, 1964
- Phthonerodes scotarcha Meyrick, 1890
