= Cilicitis =

Scientific classification
- Kingdom: Animalia
- Phylum: Arthropoda
- Class: Insecta
- Order: Lepidoptera
- Family: Xyloryctidae
- Genus: Cilicitis; Meyrick, 1938
- Species: C. phaeocremna

Binomial name
- Cilicitis phaeocremna Meyrick, 1938

Monotypic moth genus in family Xyloryctidae

Cilicitis phaeocremna is a moth in the family Xyloryctidae, and the only species in the genus Cilicitis. The genus and species were both described by Edward Meyrick in 1938 and are found in New Guinea.
