= Compsotorna =

Scientific classification
- Domain: Eukaryota
- Kingdom: Animalia
- Phylum: Arthropoda
- Class: Insecta
- Order: Lepidoptera
- Family: Xyloryctidae
- Genus: Compsotorna; Meyrick, 1890

Synonyms
- Theiosia Lucas, 1902

Moth genus in family Xyloryctidae

Compsotorna is a genus of moths of the family Xyloryctidae.

== Species ==
- Compsotorna eccrita Turner, 1917
- Compsotorna oligarchica Meyrick, 1890
