= Idiomictis =

Scientific classification
- Kingdom: Animalia
- Phylum: Arthropoda
- Class: Insecta
- Order: Lepidoptera
- Family: Xyloryctidae
- Genus: Idiomictis; Meyrick, 1935

Moth genus in family Xyloryctidae

Idiomictis is a genus of moths of the family Xyloryctidae.

== Species ==
- Idiomictis aneuropa Meyrick, 1935
- Idiomictis rhizonoma Meyrick, 1935
