= Symphorostola =

Scientific classification
- Domain: Eukaryota
- Kingdom: Animalia
- Phylum: Arthropoda
- Class: Insecta
- Order: Lepidoptera
- Family: Xyloryctidae
- Genus: Symphorostola; Meyrick, 1927
- Species: S. encomias

Binomial name
- Symphorostola encomias Meyrick, 1927

Monotypic moth genus in family Xyloryctidae

Symphorostola encomias is a moth in the family Xyloryctidae, and the only species in the genus Symphorostola. Both species and genus were described by Edward Meyrick in 1927. The species is found on Sumatra.

The wingspan is about 13 mm. The forewings are blackish with the costal edge finely white towards the middle and with an irregular dark blue-leaden basal blotch not reaching the costa of the dorsum. There is a dark blue-leaden subtriangular blotch on the costa before the middle, where an irregular streak runs to the anterior end of an oblong fulvous-brown blotch extending along the posterior half of the dorsum to the termen, the second discal stigma represented by a blue leaden-metallic spot resting on the edge of this blotch, a spot of white irroration in this above the tornus. The hindwings are blackish-fuscous with an irregular elongate-oval pale ochreous-yellow blotch in the disc.
