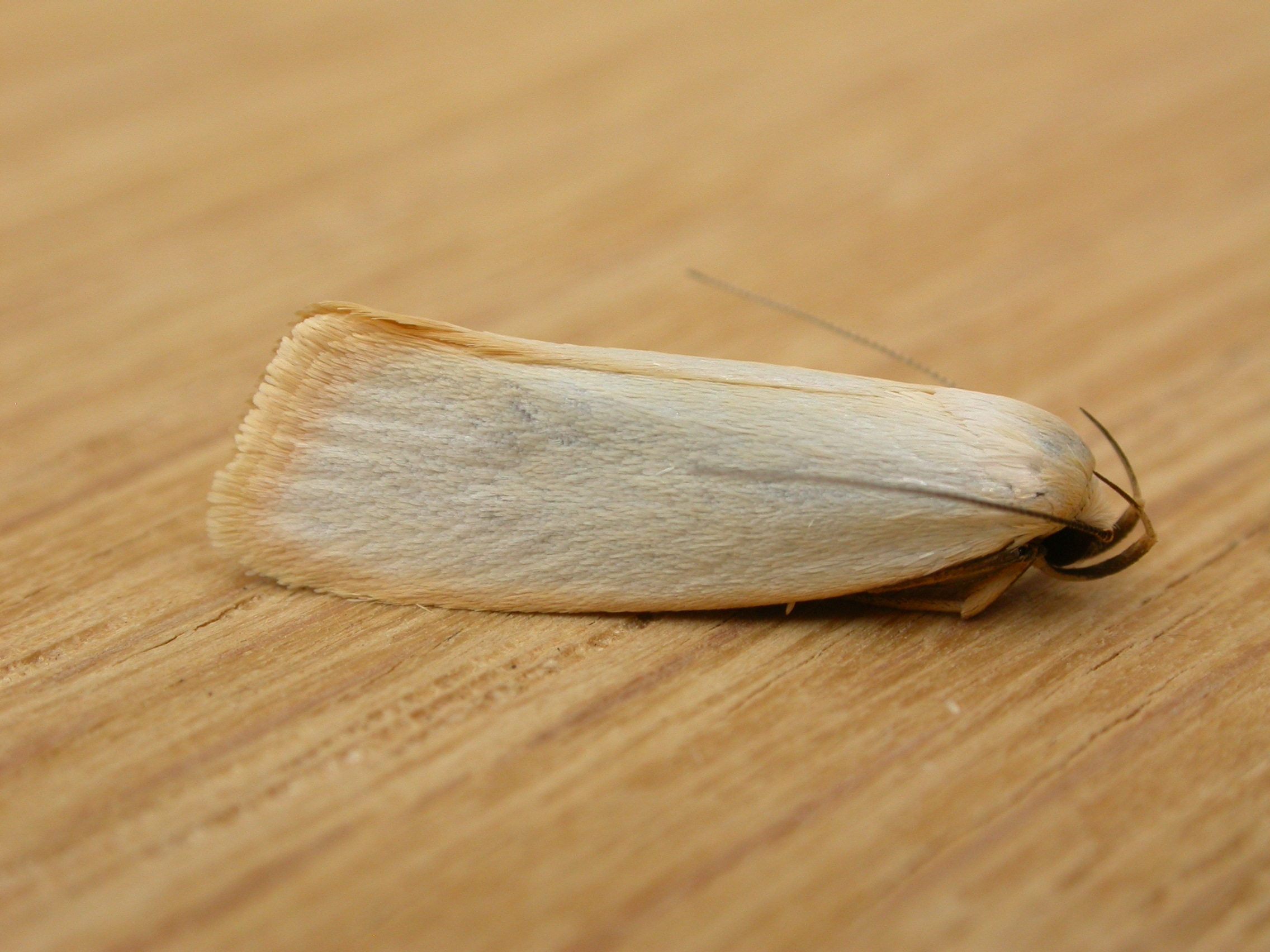
- Adult Xylorycta assimilis of the Xyloryctidae in Aranda, Australia; Note prominent curved labial palpi and long antennae

Scientific classification
- Kingdom: Animalia
- Phylum: Arthropoda
- Class: Insecta
- Order: Lepidoptera
- Superfamily: Gelechioidea
- Family: Xyloryctidae; Meyrick, 1890

Genera
- See text

Synonyms
- Cryptophasidae Kirby, 1897; Uzuchidae Hampson, 1918; Xyloryctinae

= Xyloryctidae =

Timber moths

Family of moths

Xyloryctidae is a family of moths contained within the superfamily Gelechioidea described by Edward Meyrick in 1890. Most genera are found in the Indo-Australian region. While many of these moths are tiny, some members of the family grow to a wingspan of up to 66 mm, making them giants among the micromoths.

The first recorded instance of a common name for these moths comes from Swainson's On the History and Natural Arrangement of Insects, 1840, where members of the genus Cryptophasa are described as hermit moths. This is an allusion to the caterpillar's habit of living alone in a purely residential burrow in a tree branch, to which it drags leaves at night, attaching them with silk to the entrance to the burrow and consuming the leaves as they dry out.

The name 'timber moths' was coined by the Queensland naturalist Rowland Illidge in 1892, later published in 1895, and serves to distinguish these moths from other wood-boring Australian moths such as ghost moths (Hepialidae) and giant wood moths (Cossidae), which feed on sap or wood. It refers to the fact that the larvae of most members of this family are arboreal, whether they burrow into branches, bore into flower heads, tunnel under bark, or feed on lichens. Moths of the genus Maroga are pests of wattles (Acacia) and have crossed over from their wild host plant to become serious pests of cultivated stone fruit trees, particularly cherries.

Formerly, Xyloryctidae were placed in the Oecophoridae as the subfamily Xyloryctinae. Recent research suggests the Xyloryctidae are an independent family, sharing common ancestry with the Oecophoridae, but not descended from them.

== Taxonomy and systematics ==
The family includes the following genera:

- Acompsogma Meyrick, 1938
- Amorbaea Meyrick, 1908
- Anachastis Meyrick, 1911
- Anoditica Meyrick, 1938
- Anoecea Diakonoff, 1951
- Antisclerota Meyrick, 1938
- Araeostoma Turner, 1917
- Arignota Turner, 1898
- Arsirrhyncha Meyrick, 1938
- Athrypsiastis Meyrick, 1910
- Bassarodes Meyrick, 1910
- Bathydoxa Turner, 1935
- Bida Walker, 1864
- Boydia Newman, 1856
- Brachybelistis Turner, 1902
- Caenorycta Meyrick, 1922
- Callicopris Meyrick, 1938
- Capnolocha Meyrick, 1925
- Catanomistis Meyrick, 1933
- Catoryctis Meyrick, 1890
- Chalarotona Meyrick, 1890
- Chereuta Meyrick, 1906
- Chironeura Diakonoff, 1954
- Cilicitis Meyrick, 1938
- Cladophantis Meyrick, 1918
- Clepsigenes Meyrick, 1930
- Clerarcha Meyrick, 1890
- Comocritis Meyrick, 1894
- Compsotorna Meyrick, 1890
- Copidoris Meyrick, 1907
- Crypsicharis Meyrick, 1890
- Cryptophasa Lewin, 1805
- Cyanocrates Meyrick, 1925
- Cyphoryctis Meyrick, 1934
- Donacostola Meyrick, 1931
- Echiomima Meyrick, 1915
- Epichostis Meyrick, 1906
- Epidiopteryx Rebel in Rebel & Zerny, 1916
- Eporycta Meyrick, 1908
- Eschatura Meyrick, 1897
- Eumenodora Meyrick, 1906
- Eupetochira Meyrick, 1917
- Exacristis Meyrick, 1921
- Exoditis Meyrick, 1933
- Gemorodes Meyrick, 1925
- Ghuryx Viette, 1956
- Glycynympha Meyrick, 1925
- Gomphoscopa Lower, 1901
- Gonioma Turner, 1898
- Hermogenes Zeller, 1867
- Heterochyta Meyrick, 1906
- Hierodoris Meyrick, 1912
- Hylypnes Turner, 1897
- Hyperoptica Meyrick in Caradja & Meyrick, 1934
- Idiomictis Meyrick, 1935
- Illidgea Turner, 1898
- Iulactis Meyrick, 1918
- Leistarcha Meyrick, 1883
- Leptobelistis Turner, 1902
- Lichenaula Meyrick, 1890
- Linoclostis Meyrick, 1908
- Liparistis Meyrick, 1915
- Lophobela Turner, 1917
- Malacognostis Meyrick, 1926
- Maroga Walker, 1864
- Metantithyra Viette, 1957
- Metathrinca Meyrick, 1908
- Microphidias Meyrick, 1937
- Mnarolitia Viette, 1954
- Mystacernis Meyrick, 1915
- Neospastis Meyrick, 1917
- Niphorycta Meyrick, 1938
- Opisina Walker, 1864
- Pansepta Meyrick, 1915
- Pantelamprus Christoph, 1882
- Paraclada Meyrick, 1911
- Paralecta Turner, 1898
- Perixestis Meyrick, 1917
- Philarista Meyrick, 1917
- Phracyps Viette, 1952
- Phthonerodes Meyrick, 1890
- Pilostibes Meyrick, 1890
- Plectophila Meyrick, 1890
- Potniarcha Meyrick, 1917
- Prothamnodes Meyrick, 1923
- Psarolitia Viette, 1956
- Pseudoprocometis Viette, 1952
- Sphalerostola Meyrick, 1927
- Stachyneura Diakonoff, 1948
- Symphorostola Meyrick, 1927
- Synchalara Meyrick, 1917
- Telecrates Meyrick, 1890
- Thymiatris Meyrick, 1907
- Thysiarcha Meyrick, 1925
- Thyrocopa Meyrick, 1883
- Trypherantis Meyrick, 1907
- Tymbophora Meyrick, 1890
- Uzucha Walker, 1864
- Xerocrates Meyrick, 1917
- Xylodryadella T. B. Fletcher, 1940
- Xylomimetes Turner, 1916
- Xylorycta Meyrick, 1890
- Zaphanaula Meyrick, 1920
- Zauclophora Turner, 1900
