= Insana =

Insana may refer to:

== People ==
- Jolanda Insana (1937–2016), Italian poet and translator
- Ron Insana (born 1961), American finance reporter and author
- Tino Insana (1948–2017), American actor, producer, and writer

== Species ==
- Cryptophasa insana, species of moth
- Eupithecia insana, species of moth
- Lethe insana, species of butterfly
