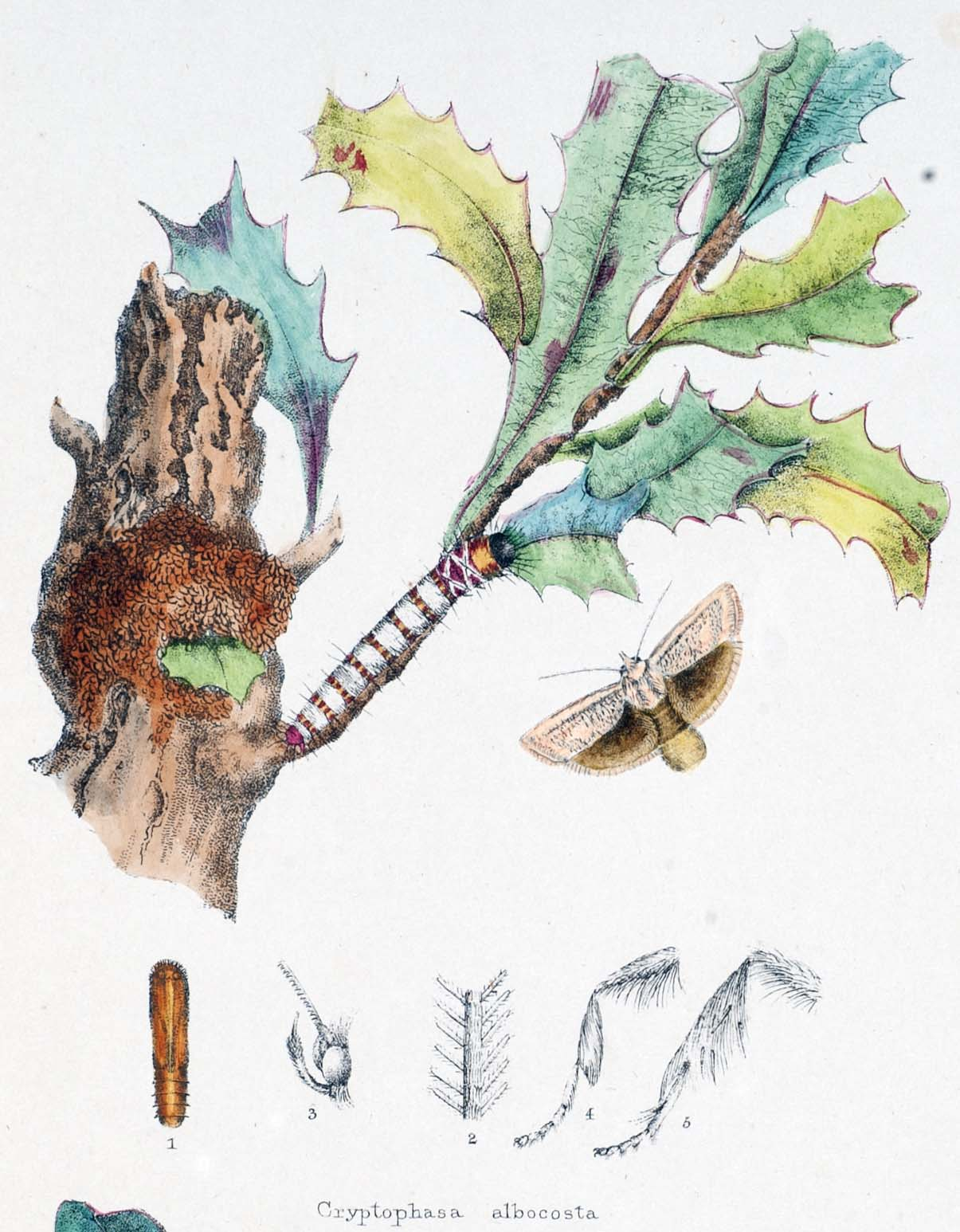
- Cryptophasa_albacosta
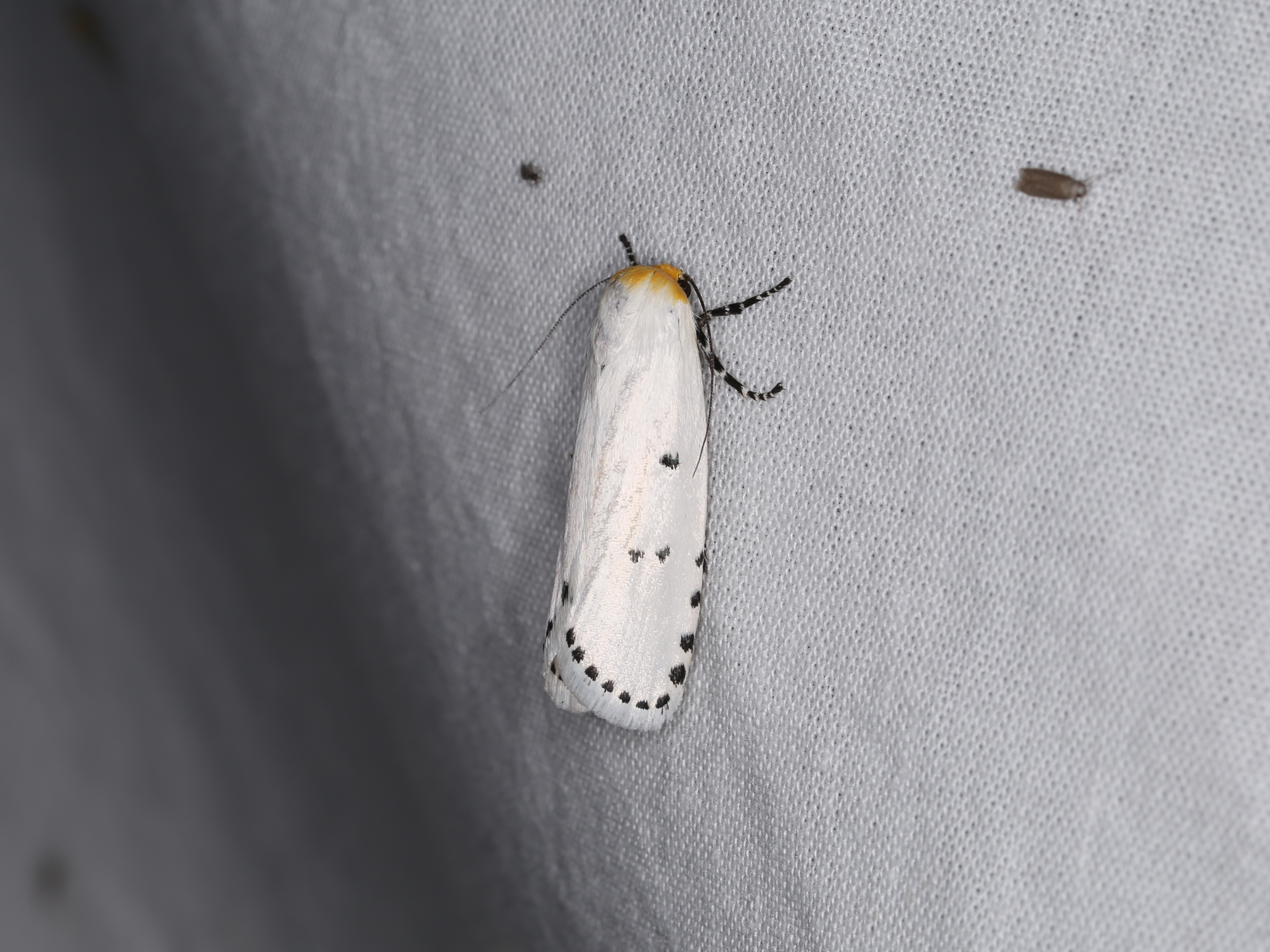
- Cryptophasa_delocentra

Scientific classification
- Kingdom: Animalia
- Phylum: Arthropoda
- Class: Insecta
- Order: Lepidoptera
- Family: Xyloryctidae
- Genus: Cryptophasa; Lewin, 1805

Synonyms
- Nycterobia Kirby, 1815; Nycterobius Kirby, 1815; Nycterobius Boisduval, 1832; Zitua Walker, 1866; Cryptophaga Meyrick, 1890

= Cryptophasa =

Moth genus in family Xyloryctidae

Cryptophasa is a genus of moths of the family Xyloryctidae.

== Species ==
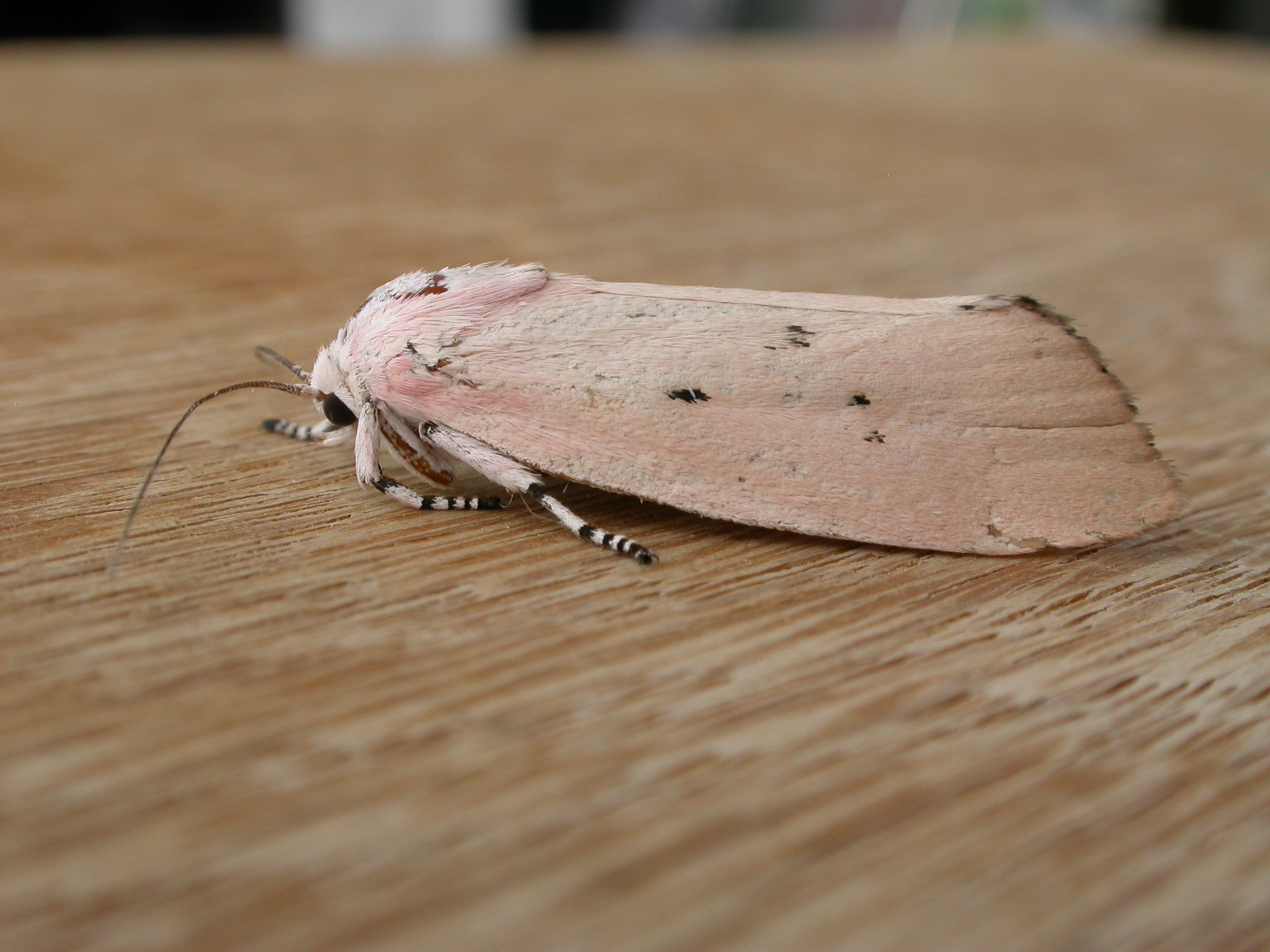
Cryptophasa hyalinopa

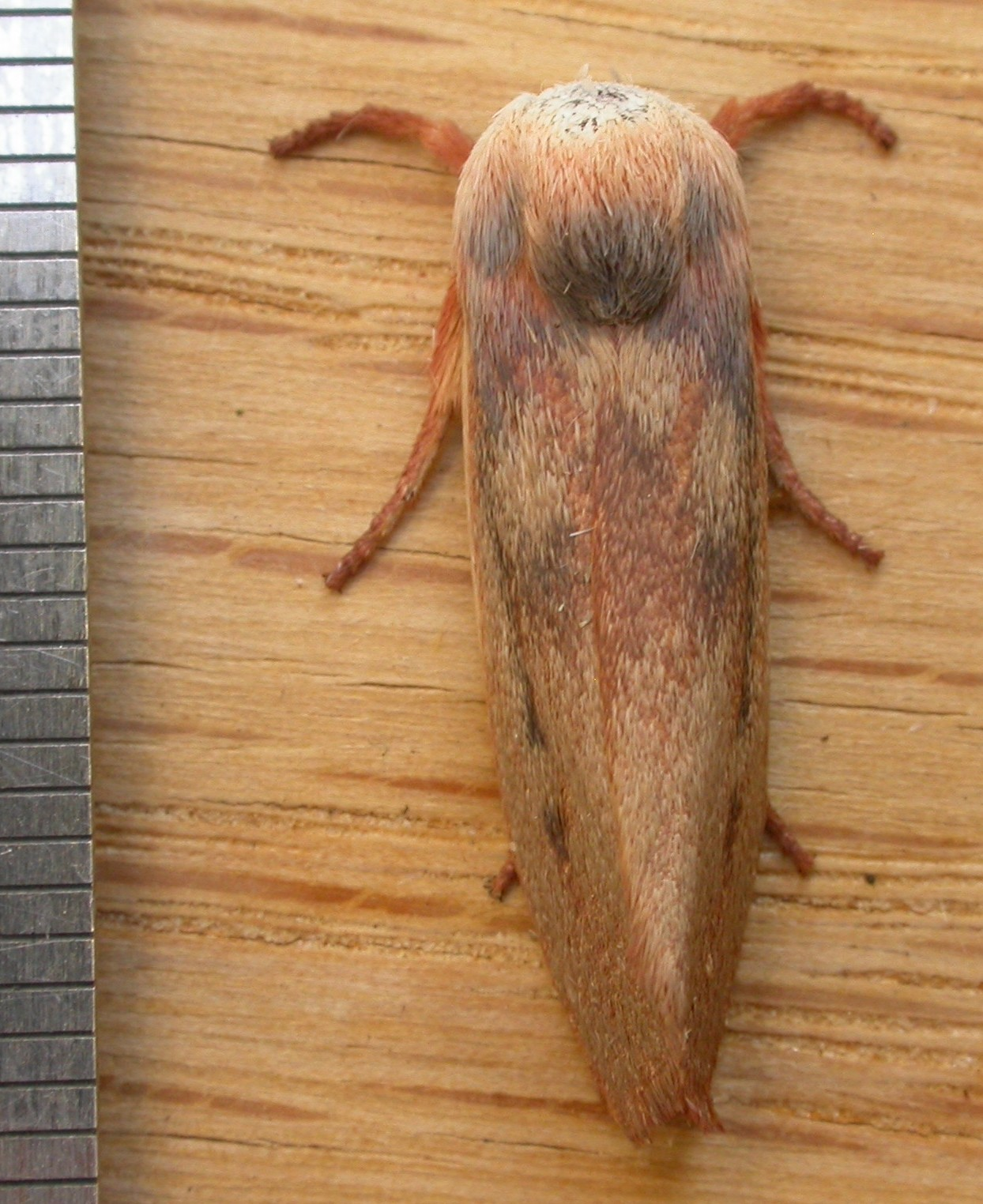
Cryptophasa rubescens

- Cryptophasa aethoptera Meyrick, 1938
- Cryptophasa aglaodes (Lower, 1893)
- Cryptophasa albacosta Lewin, 1805
- Cryptophasa alphitodes Turner, 1904
- Cryptophasa amphicroca Meyrick, 1925
- Cryptophasa antalba Diakonoff, 1966
- Cryptophasa argophanta Meyrick, 1917
- Cryptophasa argyrias Turner, 1906
- Cryptophasa argyrocolla Turner, 1917
- Cryptophasa arithmologa Meyrick, 1938
- Cryptophasa atecmarta Turner, 1917
- Cryptophasa balteata (Walker, 1866)
- Cryptophasa blosyra Turner, 1917
- Cryptophasa byssinopis Turner, 1902
- Cryptophasa cannea (Lucas, 1901)
- Cryptophasa catharia Turner, 1917
- Cryptophasa chionacra Diakonoff, 1954
- Cryptophasa chionodes (Turner, 1898)
- Cryptophasa chionosema Meyrick, 1938
- Cryptophasa chionotarsa Meyrick, 1925
- Cryptophasa chlorotis Diakonoff, 1954
- Cryptophasa citrinopa (Lower, 1915)
- Cryptophasa crocochorda Meyrick, 1925
- Cryptophasa crossosticta Meyrick, 1938
- Cryptophasa curialis Meyrick, 1925
- Cryptophasa delocentra (Meyrick, 1890)
- Cryptophasa diplosema (Lower, 1903)
- Cryptophasa ensigera Meyrick, 1925
- Cryptophasa epadelpha (Meyrick, 1890)
- Cryptophasa epixysta Turner, 1917
- Cryptophasa eumorpha (Turner, 1898)
- Cryptophasa flavolineata (Walker, 1864)
- Cryptophasa geron Diakonoff, 1954
- Cryptophasa gypsomera (Lower, 1903)
- Cryptophasa hades Diakonoff, 1954
- Cryptophasa hormocrossa Meyrick, 1925
- Cryptophasa hyalinopa (Lower, 1901)
- Cryptophasa immaculata Scott, 1864
- Cryptophasa insana (Felder & Rogenhofer, 1875)
- Cryptophasa iorhypara Diakonoff, 1954
- Cryptophasa irrorata Lewin, 1805
- Cryptophasa isoneura (Lower, 1902)
- Cryptophasa lasiocosma (Lower, 1908)
- Cryptophasa leucadelpha Meyrick, 1887
- Cryptophasa luciflua Meyrick, 1938
- Cryptophasa malevolens Meyrick, 1928
- Cryptophasa megalorma Meyrick, 1910
- Cryptophasa melanoscia (Lower, 1903)
- Cryptophasa merocentra Meyrick, 1925
- Cryptophasa mesotoma Meyrick, 1925
- Cryptophasa molaris (Lucas, 1900)
- Cryptophasa neocrates Meyrick, 1925
- Cryptophasa nephrosema (Turner, 1898)
- Cryptophasa nesograpta Meyrick, 1925
- Cryptophasa nigricincta (Turner, 1898)
- Cryptophasa niphadobela Diakonoff, 1954
- Cryptophasa nubila (Lucas, 1894)
- Cryptophasa nymphidias Turner, 1926
- Cryptophasa obscura Diakonoff, 1954
- Cryptophasa ochroleuca (Lower, 1892)
- Cryptophasa oecodoma Meyrick, 1930
- Cryptophasa opalina (Turner, 1900)
- Cryptophasa panleuca (Lower, 1901)
- Cryptophasa phaeochtha Meyrick, 1925
- Cryptophasa phaethontia (Meyrick, 1890)
- Cryptophasa phycidoides (Lucas, 1901)
- Cryptophasa platypedimela (Lower, 1894)
- Cryptophasa porphyritis Turner, 1906
- Cryptophasa psammochtha Meyrick, 1925
- Cryptophasa psathyra (Diakonoff, 1948)
- Cryptophasa pseudogramma Meyrick, 1930
- Cryptophasa psilocrossa Turner, 1902
- Cryptophasa psiloderma Diakonoff, 1948
- Cryptophasa pultenae Lewin, 1805
- Cryptophasa ranunculus Diakonoff, 1954
- Cryptophasa rubescens Lewin, 1805
- Cryptophasa rubra (Meyrick, 1890)
- Cryptophasa russata Butler, 1877
- Cryptophasa sacerdos Turner, 1902
- Cryptophasa sarcinota (Meyrick, 1890)
- Cryptophasa semnocrana Meyrick, 1928
- Cryptophasa sepiogramma Meyrick, 1938
- Cryptophasa spilonota Scott, 1864
- Cryptophasa stenoleuca (Lower, 1894)
- Cryptophasa stochastis (Meyrick, 1890)
- Cryptophasa tecta (Lucas, 1894)
- Cryptophasa tetrazona (Lower, 1901)
- Cryptophasa themerodes Turner, 1904
- Cryptophasa vacuefacta Meyrick, 1925
- Cryptophasa watungi Sutrisno & Suwito, 2015
- Cryptophasa xylomima Turner, 1906
- Cryptophasa zorodes Turner, 1917

== Former species ==
- Cryptophasa bipunctata Scott, 1864
- Cryptophasa monoleuca (Lower, 1894) (=Tirathaba monoleuca)
- Cryptophasa sceliphrodes Meyrick, 1925
- Cryptophasa transversella Snellen, 1878
