= Cryptophasa leucadelpha =

Scientific classification
- Kingdom: Animalia
- Phylum: Arthropoda
- Clade: Pancrustacea
- Class: Insecta
- Order: Lepidoptera
- Family: Xyloryctidae
- Genus: Cryptophasa
- Species: C. leucadelpha

Binomial name
- Cryptophasa leucadelpha Meyrick, 1887

Species of moth

Cryptophasa leucadelpha is a moth in the family Xyloryctidae. It was described by Edward Meyrick in 1887. It is found in Australia, where it has been recorded from New South Wales, Queensland and Victoria.

The wingspan is 41–46 mm. Adults are similar to Cryptophasa irrorata, but the abdomen is grey whitish and the hindwings are white, with moderately broad suffused fuscous hindmarginal fascia not reaching the anal angle.

The larvae feed on Casuarina species. They bore in the stem of their host plant.
