= Cryptophasa phycidoides =

Scientific classification
- Kingdom: Animalia
- Phylum: Arthropoda
- Clade: Pancrustacea
- Class: Insecta
- Order: Lepidoptera
- Family: Xyloryctidae
- Genus: Cryptophasa
- Species: C. phycidoides

Binomial name
- Cryptophasa phycidoides (T. P. Lucas, 1901)

Synonyms
- Cryptophaga phycidoides T. P. Lucas, 1901

Species of moth

Cryptophasa phycidoides is a moth in the family Xyloryctidae. It was described by Thomas Pennington Lucas in 1901. It is found in Australia, where it has been recorded from New South Wales and Queensland.

The wingspan is about 30 mm. The forewings are silvery white, freely covered with grey scales, with a diffusion of fuscous along the veins, and the markings darker fuscous. The costa is very finely edged with silver and there is a snow-white patch over the costal half of the base, bordered by a fine black costal line, and one or more short black lines posteriorly. The diffusion from the veins is spread to the costa, darker toward the apex. There is an indistinct diffusion of fuscous in the disc, subtended from a dark spot in the costa at three-fifths. Beyond this, a circular zone of fuscous is found at equal distance from all the borders, marked with darker spots on the veins, three or four dark fuscous spots beyond one-fifth of the inner margin. There is a hindmarginal fuscous line, with darker spots between the veins. The hindwings are silvery white, with smoky scales towards the costa and hindmargin.
