= Cryptophasa molaris =

Scientific classification
- Kingdom: Animalia
- Phylum: Arthropoda
- Clade: Pancrustacea
- Class: Insecta
- Order: Lepidoptera
- Family: Xyloryctidae
- Genus: Cryptophasa
- Species: C. molaris

Binomial name
- Cryptophasa molaris (T. P. Lucas, 1900)

Synonyms
- Cryptophaga molaris T. P. Lucas, 1900; Cryptophasa pellopis Turner, 1906

Species of moth

Cryptophasa molaris is a moth in the family Xyloryctidae. It was described by Thomas Pennington Lucas in 1900. It is found in Australia, where it has been recorded from New South Wales and Queensland.

The wingspan is 29–36 mm. The forewings are fuscous drab, freely marked with black and grey. There are interrupted fine lines of white along half to three-fourths of the costa and the costal half of the wing is irregularly diffused with rich black, the inner half and base of the wing is freely irrorated (sprinkled) with white, this white arches toward the costa at the base, and extends as a line to near the costa just before the apex. There is also a subterminal band of ground colour, bordered by a terminal line of light black dots. The hindwings are fuscous drab.
