= Cryptophasa cannea =

Scientific classification
- Kingdom: Animalia
- Phylum: Arthropoda
- Clade: Pancrustacea
- Class: Insecta
- Order: Lepidoptera
- Family: Xyloryctidae
- Genus: Cryptophasa
- Species: C. cannea

Binomial name
- Cryptophasa cannea (T. P. Lucas, 1901)

Synonyms
- Cryptophaga cannea T. P. Lucas, 1901

Species of moth

Cryptophasa cannea is a moth in the family Xyloryctidae. It was described by Thomas Pennington Lucas in 1901. It is found in Australia, where it has been recorded from Queensland.

The wingspan is 18–24 mm. The forewings are ochreous red and the hindwings are smoky grey, with the veins distinctly outlined.

The larvae possibly feed on Banksia species.
