= Arignota stercorata =

Scientific classification
- Domain: Eukaryota
- Kingdom: Animalia
- Phylum: Arthropoda
- Class: Insecta
- Order: Lepidoptera
- Family: Xyloryctidae
- Genus: Arignota
- Species: A. stercorata

Binomial name
- Arignota stercorata (T. P. Lucas, 1894)

Synonyms
- Xylorycta stercorata T. P. Lucas, 1894

Species of moth

Arignota stercorata is a moth in the family Xyloryctidae. It was described by Thomas Pennington Lucas in 1894. It is found in Australia, where it has been recorded from New South Wales and Queensland. It is also found in Papua New Guinea.

The wingspan is 28–35 mm. The forewings are white, with a number of pale leaden-coloured spots imitative of birds' droppings. There is an acute spot in the centre and a splash tinted with ferrous in the inner angle of the base. A triangular blotch is found at three-fifths of the costa and there are five round spots, the first near the costa at one-eighths, the second obliquely to the first and posterior, the third before the middle in the centre of the wing, the fourth at three-fourths of the wing, the fifth in a line with the fourth but nearer to the costa. Two sharp dots are arranged diagonally with first and second spots and four dots form a rhomboid figure at three-fifths, the two hinder ones tinted with purplish black. There is also an obscure dot on the hindmargin at five-sixths, and another half-way between this and the apex. There are three rows of fine hindmarginal spots. The hindwings are white.

The larvae feed on Elaeocarpus obovatus. They bore in the stem, feeding on leaves it cuts off and attaches at the entrance to the tunnel.
