= Cryptophasa tecta =

Scientific classification
- Kingdom: Animalia
- Phylum: Arthropoda
- Clade: Pancrustacea
- Class: Insecta
- Order: Lepidoptera
- Family: Xyloryctidae
- Genus: Cryptophasa
- Species: C. tecta

Binomial name
- Cryptophasa tecta (T. P. Lucas, 1894)

Synonyms
- Pilostibes tecta T. P. Lucas, 1894; Cryptophasa baliocosma Turner, 1917

Species of moth

Cryptophasa tecta is a moth in the family Xyloryctidae. It was described by Thomas Pennington Lucas in 1894. It is found in Australia, where it has been recorded from the Northern Territory and Queensland.

The wingspan is 25–28 mm. The forewings are slaty grey, becoming ashy grey toward the base and the basal half of the costa, finely and profusely pencilled with black, a row of conspicuous black spots on the median, the first near the base, the second at one-third, and the third at two-thirds, a row of three inconspicuous black dots on the costa at one-fifth, two-thirds and three-fourths. The hindwings are fuscous grey.
