= Cryptophasa nubila =

Scientific classification
- Kingdom: Animalia
- Phylum: Arthropoda
- Clade: Pancrustacea
- Class: Insecta
- Order: Lepidoptera
- Family: Xyloryctidae
- Genus: Cryptophasa
- Species: C. nubila

Binomial name
- Cryptophasa nubila (T. P. Lucas, 1894)

Synonyms
- Cryptophaga nubila T. P. Lucas, 1894; Cryptophaga nubila var. alba Turner, 1898; Cryptophaga intermedia T. P. Lucas, 1894; Cryptophaga intermedia var. alba T. P. Lucas, 1894

Species of moth

Cryptophasa nubila is a moth in the family Xyloryctidae. It was described by Thomas Pennington Lucas in 1894. It is found in Australia, where it has been recorded from New South Wales and Queensland.

The wingspan is 30–42 mm. The forewings are grey white freely irrorated (sprinkled) with smoky-black scales, the veins are smoky grey. There is a suffusion of smoky black all around the disc leaving the disc a grey white as the ground colour. A similar suffusion is found on the inner border leaving a narrow strip of ground colour between it and the darker area of the wing. There is no distinct discal spot. In females, the hindwings are white diffused with ashy grey and with streaks of white from the base in the interneural spaces. The veins are smoky grey.

The larvae feed on Lophostemon suaveolens, Backhousia myrtifolia, Melaleuca leucadendra, Melaleuca lineariifolia, Callistemon salignus, Callistemon lanceolatus, Syzygium luehmannii and Psidium guava. They bore in the stem of their host plant.
