= Arignota decipiens =

Scientific classification
- Domain: Eukaryota
- Kingdom: Animalia
- Phylum: Arthropoda
- Class: Insecta
- Order: Lepidoptera
- Family: Xyloryctidae
- Genus: Arignota
- Species: A. decipiens

Binomial name
- Arignota decipiens Diakonoff, 1954

Species of moth

Arignota decipiens is a moth in the family Xyloryctidae. It was described by Alexey Diakonoff in 1954. It is found in New Guinea.
