= Cryptophasa mesotoma =

Scientific classification
- Kingdom: Animalia
- Phylum: Arthropoda
- Clade: Pancrustacea
- Class: Insecta
- Order: Lepidoptera
- Family: Xyloryctidae
- Genus: Cryptophasa
- Species: C. mesotoma

Binomial name
- Cryptophasa mesotoma Meyrick, 1925

Synonyms
- Caenorycta dryoxantha Meyrick, 1922

Species of moth

Cryptophasa mesotoma is a moth in the family Xyloryctidae. It was described by Edward Meyrick in 1925. It is found on Buru in the Maluku Islands.

The wingspan is 38–44 mm. The forewings are white, sometimes with scattered dark fuscous specks, the basal fourth of the costal edge is dark fuscous suffused with brown and the dorsal half is suffused with pale ochreous, the dorsal area is suffused with light fuscous. The markings are dark fuscous suffused with brown. There is a supramedian line from near the base to one-third and a median line from beneath the middle of this to the middle of the termen. A short longitudinal mark is found above this beyond the middle and there is a small mark on the base of the fold, as well as short longitudinal streaks on and above the fold before the middle. There is a blotch of scanty irroration (sprinkles) resting on the dorsum beyond the middle and a short line along the costa at about three-fourths. The hindwings are glossy pale greyish ochreous.
