= Cryptophasa albacosta =

Scientific classification
- Kingdom: Animalia
- Phylum: Arthropoda
- Clade: Pancrustacea
- Class: Insecta
- Order: Lepidoptera
- Family: Xyloryctidae
- Genus: Cryptophasa
- Species: C. albacosta

Binomial name
- Cryptophasa albacosta Lewin, 1805

Synonyms
- Bombyx cryptophasa Lewin, 1805; Cryptophaga albicosta Meyrick, 1890

Species of moth

Cryptophasa albacosta, the small fruit tree borer, is a moth in the family Xyloryctidae. It was described by John Lewin in 1805. It is found in Australia, where it has been recorded from New South Wales, Queensland, South Australia, Tasmania and Victoria.

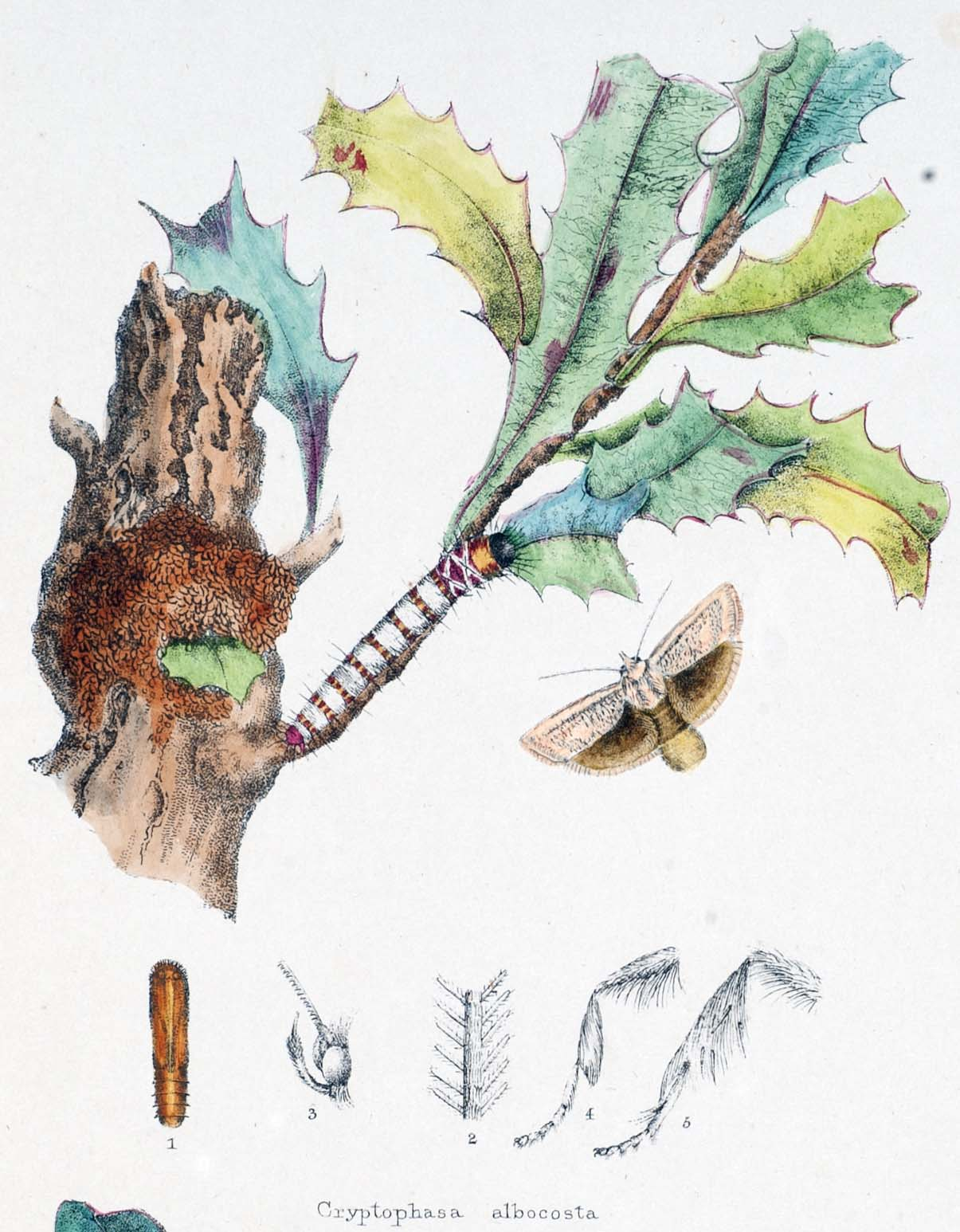
Plate depicting the life cycle of Cryptophasa albacosta

The wingspan is 40–56 mm. The forewings are shining white with a very large subtriangular grey blotch, more or less suffused with ochreous-brown and sprinkled with black, resting on the inner margin from before one-third to five-sixths, its apex nearly touching the costa near the base. There is a minute black grey-circled dot in the disc at two-fifths, resting on the posterior margin of the blotch. A grey sometimes white-centred reniform spot is found in the disc at three-fifths and there is a more or less developed grey fascia from the middle of the disc, and another from beyond the reniform spot, not rising above it, confluent below it and running into the posterior angle of the blotch, variable in breadth, rarely broadened to coalesce with the hindmarginal fascia. There is also a moderate light grey hindmarginal fascia, including a brownish-ochreous hind marginal line, preceded by a row of black dots circled with ochreous-whitish. The hindwings are rather dark fuscous-grey with a cloudy white streak along the upper half of the hindmargin, dilated into a spot at the apex.

The larvae feed on Banksia serrata, Macadamia integrifolia, Ceratopetalum gummiferum, Callicoma serratifolia, as well as introduced Tamarix species, poplar, apricot and plum. They bore in the stems of their host plant, tying cut leaves to the bore entrance.
