= Cryptophasa megalorma =

Scientific classification
- Kingdom: Animalia
- Phylum: Arthropoda
- Clade: Pancrustacea
- Class: Insecta
- Order: Lepidoptera
- Family: Xyloryctidae
- Genus: Cryptophasa
- Species: C. megalorma

Binomial name
- Cryptophasa megalorma Meyrick, 1910

Species of moth

Cryptophasa megalorma is a moth in the family Xyloryctidae. It was described by Edward Meyrick in 1910. It is found on New Guinea.

The wingspan is about 49 mm. The forewings are ochreous whitish, suffusedly irrorated (sprinkled) with fuscous except towards the costa and in the middle of the disc. The base of the costa is blackish and the stigmata form rather large black spots, approximated, the first discal oblique-oval, the second transverse-oval, the plical between these two, round. There are two or three streaks of blackish suffusion on the veins at about three-fourths and four small round black spots on the posterior half of the costa, and a row of large black dots along the termen, becoming larger around the tornus. The hindwings are fuscous, paler towards the costa and there is a suffused blackish dot in the middle of the disc and a series of small round suffused blackish spots around the apex and termen.
