= Cryptophasa merocentra =

Scientific classification
- Kingdom: Animalia
- Phylum: Arthropoda
- Clade: Pancrustacea
- Class: Insecta
- Order: Lepidoptera
- Family: Xyloryctidae
- Genus: Cryptophasa
- Species: C. merocentra

Binomial name
- Cryptophasa merocentra Meyrick, 1925

Species of moth

Cryptophasa merocentra is a moth in the family Xyloryctidae. It was described by Edward Meyrick in 1925. It is found on Buru in the Maluku Islands.

The wingspan is about 46 mm. The forewings are shiny white with a small and black stigma, the first discal indicated by a single black scale obliquely before this and four black dots on the posterior third of the costa, and five on the lower half of the termen. The hindwings are white.
