= Cryptophasa rubra =

Scientific classification
- Kingdom: Animalia
- Phylum: Arthropoda
- Clade: Pancrustacea
- Class: Insecta
- Order: Lepidoptera
- Family: Xyloryctidae
- Genus: Cryptophasa
- Species: C. rubra

Binomial name
- Cryptophasa rubra (Meyrick, 1890)

Synonyms
- Cryptophaga rubra Meyrick, 1890

Species of moth

Cryptophasa rubra is a moth in the family Xyloryctidae. It was described by Edward Meyrick in 1890. It is found in Australia, where it has been recorded from South Australia, Victoria and Western Australia.

The wingspan is about 50 mm. The forewings are ochreous red, deeper towards the costa and inner margin anteriorly. There is a dark fuscous dot in the disc beyond one-third, a second on the fold beneath the middle, a third in the disc at three-fifths, and a fourth between the second and third. The hindwings are pale yellowish ochreous, the apex slightly reddish tinged.
