= Cryptophasa melanoscia =

Scientific classification
- Kingdom: Animalia
- Phylum: Arthropoda
- Clade: Pancrustacea
- Class: Insecta
- Order: Lepidoptera
- Family: Xyloryctidae
- Genus: Cryptophasa
- Species: C. melanoscia

Binomial name
- Cryptophasa melanoscia (Lower, 1903)

Synonyms
- Cryptophaga melanoscia Lower, 1903

Species of moth

Cryptophasa melanoscia is a moth in the family Xyloryctidae. It was described by Oswald Bertram Lower in 1903. It is found in Australia, where it has been recorded from Victoria.

The wingspan is 40–50 mm. The forewings are ashy-grey whitish, finely irrorated (sprinkled) throughout with short black scales. The markings are black. There is a short streak from the costa near the base to the lower margin of the cell, angulated in the middle. There is a short thick mark in the cell at one-third and a second similar one at the end of the cell. The lower margin of the cell is outlined in black. From the first mark proceeds a fine line to two-thirds of the costa and the veins towards the termen are more or less outlined with black, becoming very pronounced in the middle of veins 5 and 6. There are five or six dull whitish spots, between the middle of the costa, and the apex, separated by dull fuscous marks. The hindwings are greyish fuscous, becoming lighter on the basal half.

The larvae feed on Casuarina species. They bore in the stem of their host plant.
