= Cryptophasa aglaodes =

Scientific classification
- Kingdom: Animalia
- Phylum: Arthropoda
- Clade: Pancrustacea
- Class: Insecta
- Order: Lepidoptera
- Family: Xyloryctidae
- Genus: Cryptophasa
- Species: C. aglaodes

Binomial name
- Cryptophasa aglaodes (Lower, 1893)

Synonyms
- Cryptophaga aglaodes Lower, 1893

Species of moth

Cryptophasa aglaodes is a moth in the family Xyloryctidae. It was first described by Oswald Bertram Lower in 1894. It is found in Australia, where it has been recorded from the Northern Territory, Queensland, South Australia and Victoria.

The wingspan is about 50 mm for females and 38 mm for males. The forewings are pale whitish ochreous, slightly infuscated (darkened). The costa is slenderly blackish towards the apex and there is a small well-defined black dot in the disc at one-third, and another similar obliquely beyond it, at about the middle. The hindwings are whitish ochreous.

The larvae feed on Allocasuarina verticillata.
