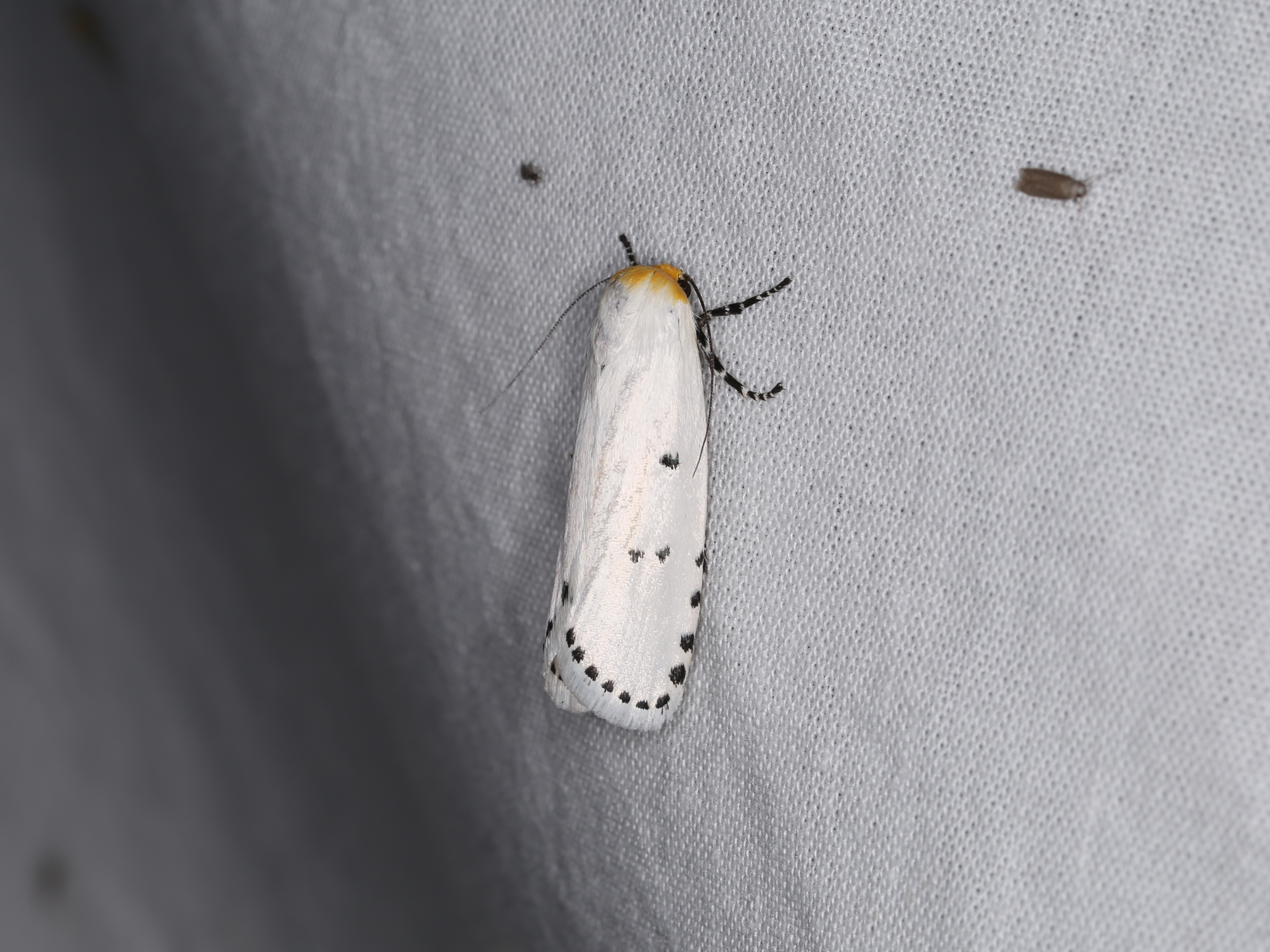

Scientific classification
- Kingdom: Animalia
- Phylum: Arthropoda
- Clade: Pancrustacea
- Class: Insecta
- Order: Lepidoptera
- Family: Xyloryctidae
- Genus: Cryptophasa
- Species: C. delocentra

Binomial name
- Cryptophasa delocentra (Meyrick, 1890)

Synonyms
- Cryptophaga delocentra Meyrick, 1890

= Cryptophasa delocentra =

Species of moth

Cryptophasa delocentra is a moth in the family Xyloryctidae. It was described by Edward Meyrick in 1890. It is found in Australia, where it has been recorded from New South Wales and Queensland.

The wingspan is about 40 mm for females and 26–30 mm for males. The forewings of the females are shining snow white with a large black dot in the disc beyond one-third and two others transversely placed in the disc at three-fifths, the lower rather posterior. There is a row of small black spots along the hind margin and apical fourth of the costa. The hindwings are snow white with a hindmarginal row of small black spots. Males differs from the females in having the extreme costal edge blackish and the hindwings are distinctly black with snow-white cilia.

The larvae feed on Ceratopetalum gummiferum, Eucalyptus gummifera and Eucalyptus camaldulensis. They bore in the stem and tie cut leaves to the bore entrance.
