= Cryptophasa psammochtha =

Scientific classification
- Kingdom: Animalia
- Phylum: Arthropoda
- Clade: Pancrustacea
- Class: Insecta
- Order: Lepidoptera
- Family: Xyloryctidae
- Genus: Cryptophasa
- Species: C. psammochtha

Binomial name
- Cryptophasa psammochtha Meyrick, 1925

Species of moth

Cryptophasa psammochtha is a moth in the family Xyloryctidae. It was described by Edward Meyrick in 1925. It is found on New Guinea.

The wingspan is 50–54 mm. The forewings are pale ochreous, with the veins on the costal half tinged with brownish and with a costal band of violet-brown suffusion. The hindwings are pale ochreous yellowish.
