= Cryptophasa themerodes =

Scientific classification
- Kingdom: Animalia
- Phylum: Arthropoda
- Clade: Pancrustacea
- Class: Insecta
- Order: Lepidoptera
- Family: Xyloryctidae
- Genus: Cryptophasa
- Species: C. themerodes

Binomial name
- Cryptophasa themerodes Turner, 1904

Species of moth

Cryptophasa themerodes is a moth in the family Xyloryctidae. It was described by Alfred Jefferis Turner in 1904. It is found in Australia, where it has been recorded from Queensland.

The wingspan is about 35 mm. The forewings are whitish, intimately mixed with grey, and with some dark fuscous scales. The discal dots are scantily represented by dark fuscous scales, the first at one-third, the second beyond the middle and the third on the fold obliquely beyond the first. There are several dark fuscous dots near the termen. The hindwings are whitish, towards the termen suffused with pale fuscous.
