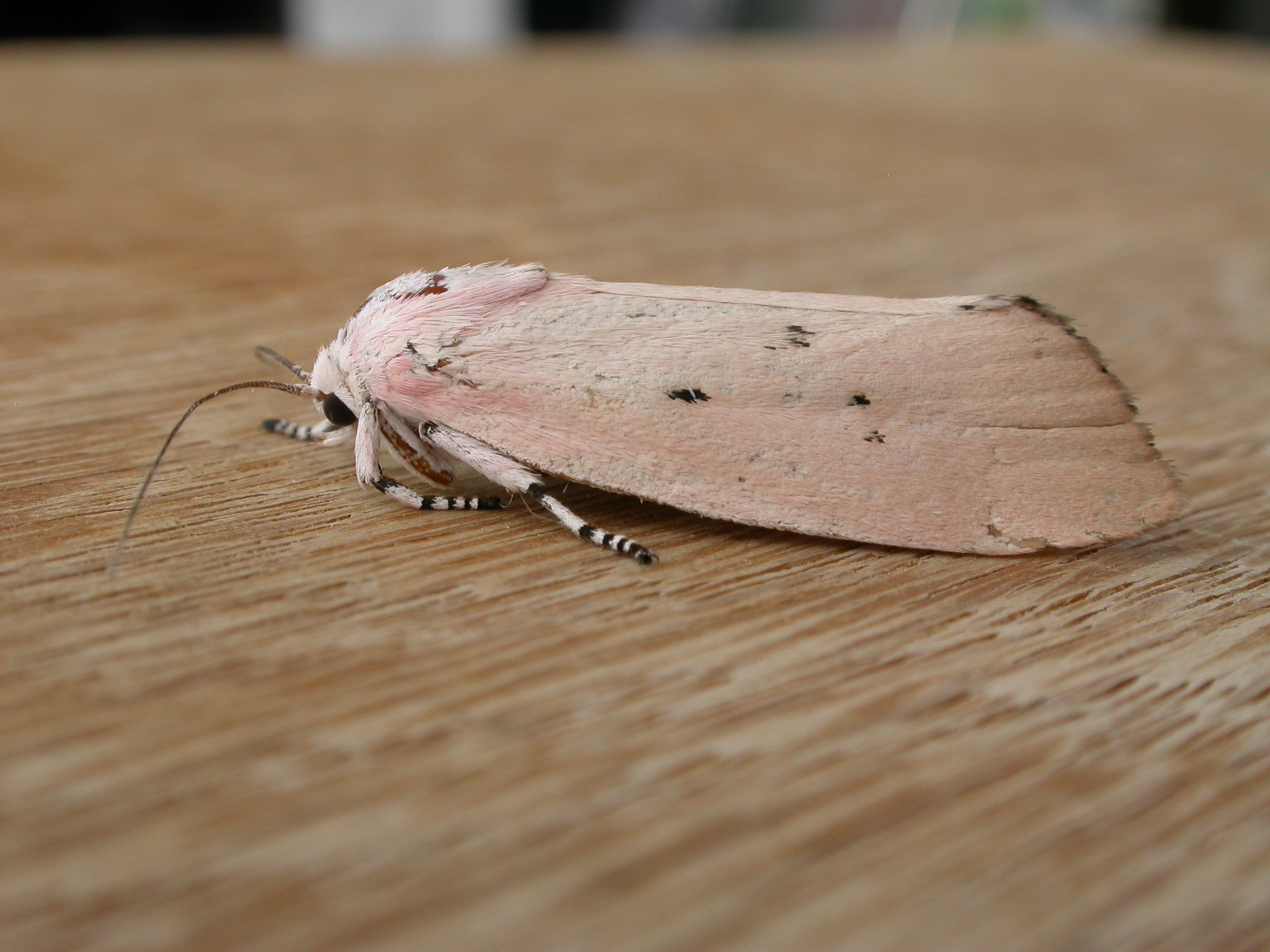

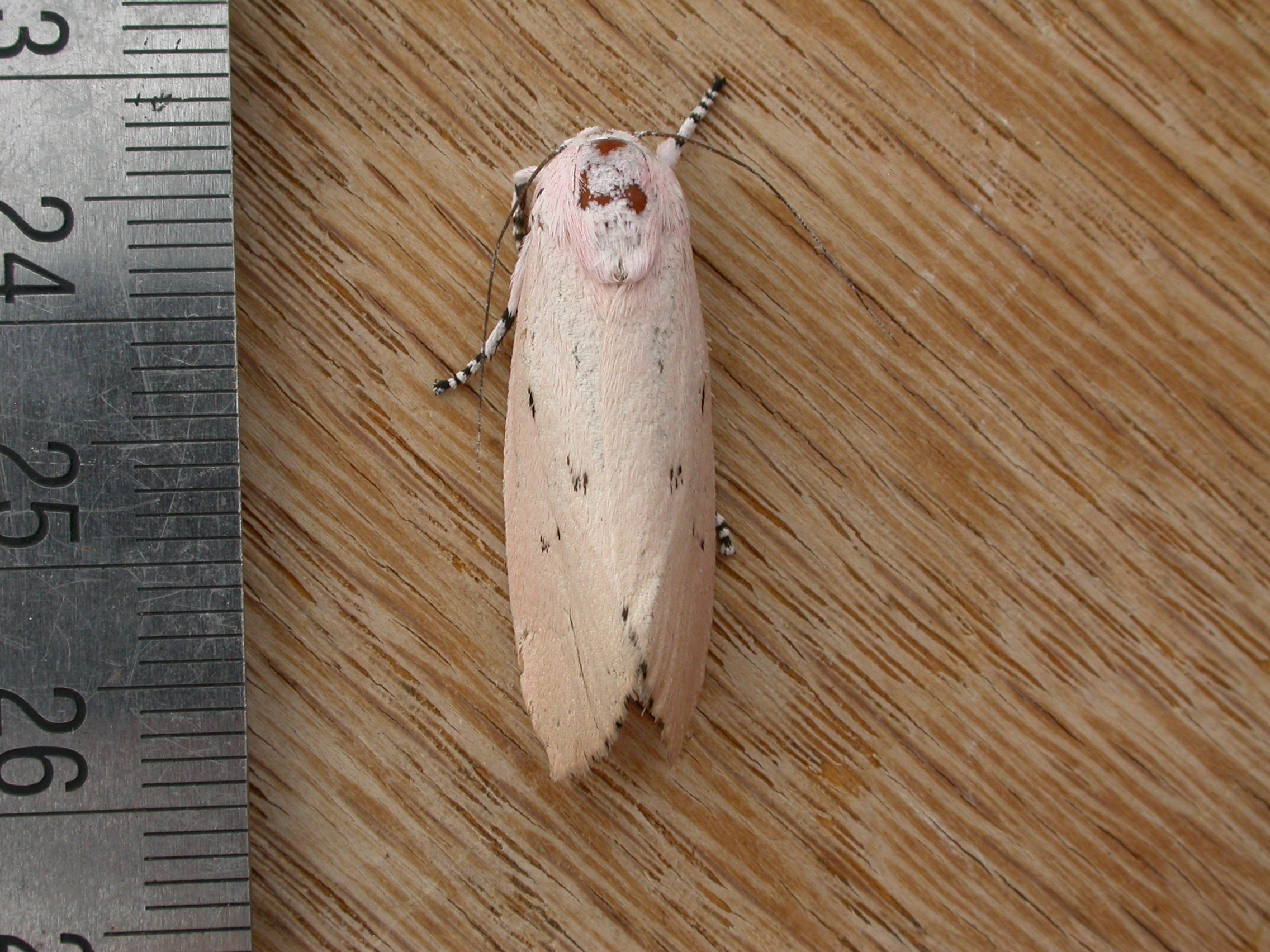

Scientific classification
- Kingdom: Animalia
- Phylum: Arthropoda
- Clade: Pancrustacea
- Class: Insecta
- Order: Lepidoptera
- Family: Xyloryctidae
- Genus: Cryptophasa
- Species: C. hyalinopa

Binomial name
- Cryptophasa hyalinopa (Lower, 1901)

Synonyms
- Cryptophaga hyalinopa Lower, 1901

= Cryptophasa hyalinopa =

Species of moth

Cryptophasa hyalinopa is a moth of the family Xyloryctidae. It is known from Queensland, Australia.

== Description ==
The wingspan is about 30 mm for males and about 66 mm for females. Head, palpi, thorax, and legs fleshy-ochreous, head somewhat pinkish tinged, tarsi ringed with blackish. Antennae blackish, pectinations: 2. Abdomen blackish, second segment orange-red. Forewings elongate, moderate, costa, nearly straight, termen obliquely rounded; fleshy-ochreous, darker on basal third; a fine black dot in disc at one-third, a second at posterior extremity of cell, and a third obliquely below and before; two others on fold beyond middle; an obscure row of fine blackish dots along termen to anal angle, not reaching apex. Hindwings semi-hyaline (glassy), basal two-thirds black; cilia whitish becoming fuscous around anal angle. Underside of both wings with basal two-thirds densely black. The sexes of this species are very dissimilar in the hindwings, the male having the terminal half hyaline and the basal half black.

== Biology ==
The larvae feed on Eucalyptus platyphylla. They bore in the stem of their host plant. Adults are on wing in September and October.
