= Cryptophasa epadelpha =

Scientific classification
- Kingdom: Animalia
- Phylum: Arthropoda
- Clade: Pancrustacea
- Class: Insecta
- Order: Lepidoptera
- Family: Xyloryctidae
- Genus: Cryptophasa
- Species: C. epadelpha

Binomial name
- Cryptophasa epadelpha (Meyrick, 1890)

Synonyms
- Cryptophaga epadelpha Meyrick, 1890

Species of moth

Cryptophasa epadelpha is a moth in the family Xyloryctidae. It was described by Edward Meyrick in 1890. It is found in Australia, where it has been recorded from New South Wales and Queensland.

The wingspan is 40–48 mm for females and 31–36 mm for males. The forewings of the females are snow white with a hind marginal series of small black dots. The hindwings are snow white with the upper half of the hindmargin marked with blackish dots. Males differ only in having black hindwings and no hindmarginal spots except on the forewings.

The larvae feed on Lophostemon confertus and Lophostemon suaveolens. They bore in the stem and tie cut leaves to the bore entrance.
