= Cryptophasa opalina =

Scientific classification
- Kingdom: Animalia
- Phylum: Arthropoda
- Clade: Pancrustacea
- Class: Insecta
- Order: Lepidoptera
- Family: Xyloryctidae
- Genus: Cryptophasa
- Species: C. opalina

Binomial name
- Cryptophasa opalina (Turner, 1900)

Synonyms
- Cryptophaga opalina Turner, 1900

Species of moth

Cryptophasa opalina is a moth in the family Xyloryctidae. It was described by Alfred Jefferis Turner in 1900. It is found in Australia, where it has been recorded from the Northern Territory, Queensland and Western Australia.

The wingspan is about 29 mm. The forewings are white with a moderately broad fascia from the costa near the base, narrowing to the inner-margin at one-fourth, produced along the costa to the base, near the costa grey, then dark-fuscous with purple reflections. There is an incomplete interrupted line posterior and parallel to this, dark-fuscous with purple reflections. There is a large fascia from the costa before the middle, much dilated in the disc and on the inner-margin, on the costa and on the posterior margin grey, the remainder a mixture of dark-fuscous with purple reflections, ochreous-brown, and white scales. There is a broad grey line parallel to the hindmargin, separated by a fine white line from a broad grey line on the margin. The hindwings are grey, towards the inner-margin whitish.
