= Cryptophasa isoneura =

Scientific classification
- Kingdom: Animalia
- Phylum: Arthropoda
- Clade: Pancrustacea
- Class: Insecta
- Order: Lepidoptera
- Family: Xyloryctidae
- Genus: Cryptophasa
- Species: C. isoneura

Binomial name
- Cryptophasa isoneura (Lower, 1902)

Synonyms
- Cryptophaga isoneura Lower, 1902

Species of moth

Cryptophasa isoneura is a moth in the family Xyloryctidae. It was described by Oswald Bertram Lower in 1902. It is found in Australia, where it has been recorded from Queensland, South Australia and Victoria.

The wingspan is about 24 mm. The forewings are ochreous whitish, irregularly suffused with rather thick streaks of smoky fuscous, especially along the costa and towards the termen. All veins are more or less outlined with black and there is a moderately large quadrate, ferruginous spot at the posterior extremity of the cell. There are some ferruginous scales just below the base of vein 2, as well as a moderate ferruginous band along the termen to the apical fifth of the costa, obliterating the lines along the veins. There is a sharp black line along the termen. The hindwings are black with the basal and inner marginal areas are greyish and strongly haired. There is a ferruginous band and line along the termen.

The larvae feed on Casuarina species. They bore in the stem of their host plant.
