= Cryptophasa sacerdos =

Scientific classification
- Kingdom: Animalia
- Phylum: Arthropoda
- Clade: Pancrustacea
- Class: Insecta
- Order: Lepidoptera
- Family: Xyloryctidae
- Genus: Cryptophasa
- Species: C. sacerdos

Binomial name
- Cryptophasa sacerdos Turner, 1902

Species of moth

Cryptophasa sacerdos is a moth in the family Xyloryctidae. It was described by Alfred Jefferis Turner in 1902. It is found in Australia, where it has been recorded from Queensland.

The wingspan is about 37 mm for males and 50–54 mm for females. The forewings of the males are blackish-fuscous, without markings. The hindwings are dark fuscous. Females have clear white forewings, the base sometimes suffused with fuscous. There is a black dot in the disc at three-fifths and a row of black dots along the apical third of the costa and hindmargin. The hindwings are fuscous, white along the costa and with some obscure blackish dots on the hindmargin.

The larvae feed on Corymbia species.
