= Cryptophasa nesograpta =

Scientific classification
- Kingdom: Animalia
- Phylum: Arthropoda
- Clade: Pancrustacea
- Class: Insecta
- Order: Lepidoptera
- Family: Xyloryctidae
- Genus: Cryptophasa
- Species: C. nesograpta

Binomial name
- Cryptophasa nesograpta Meyrick, 1925

Species of moth

Cryptophasa nesograpta is a moth in the family Xyloryctidae. It was described by Edward Meyrick in 1925. It is found on New Guinea.

The wingspan is about 40 mm. The forewings are white, with some scattered blackish-grey specks, the dorsal two-fifths are suffused with light ochreous grey and the costal edge is dark fuscous towards the base. The stigmata form reddish-brown spots more or less mixed with dark fuscous, the first discal at one-fourth, the second transverse, the plical elongate, nearly midway between these. The hindwings are ochreous whitish.
