= Cryptophasa alphitodes =

Scientific classification
- Kingdom: Animalia
- Phylum: Arthropoda
- Clade: Pancrustacea
- Class: Insecta
- Order: Lepidoptera
- Family: Xyloryctidae
- Genus: Cryptophasa
- Species: C. alphitodes

Binomial name
- Cryptophasa alphitodes Turner, 1904

Species of moth

Cryptophasa alphitodes is a moth in the family Xyloryctidae. It was described by Alfred Jefferis Turner in 1904. It is found in Australia, where it has been recorded from the Northern Territory and Queensland.

The wingspan is about 35 mm for males and 47 mm for females. The forewings are whitish, irrorated with grey. There is an oblique fuscous bar from the base of the costa to the fold and an oblique oval median discal spot outlined with fuscous scales, the centre whitish-ochreous. A few fuscous scales are found in the disc at one-third before this. The hindwings are whitish-ochreous.
