= Cryptophasa immaculata =

Scientific classification
- Kingdom: Animalia
- Phylum: Arthropoda
- Clade: Pancrustacea
- Class: Insecta
- Order: Lepidoptera
- Family: Xyloryctidae
- Genus: Cryptophasa
- Species: C. immaculata

Binomial name
- Cryptophasa immaculata Scott, 1864

Species of moth

Cryptophasa immaculata is a moth in the family Xyloryctidae. It was described by Scott in 1864. It is found in Australia, where it has been recorded in New South Wales.

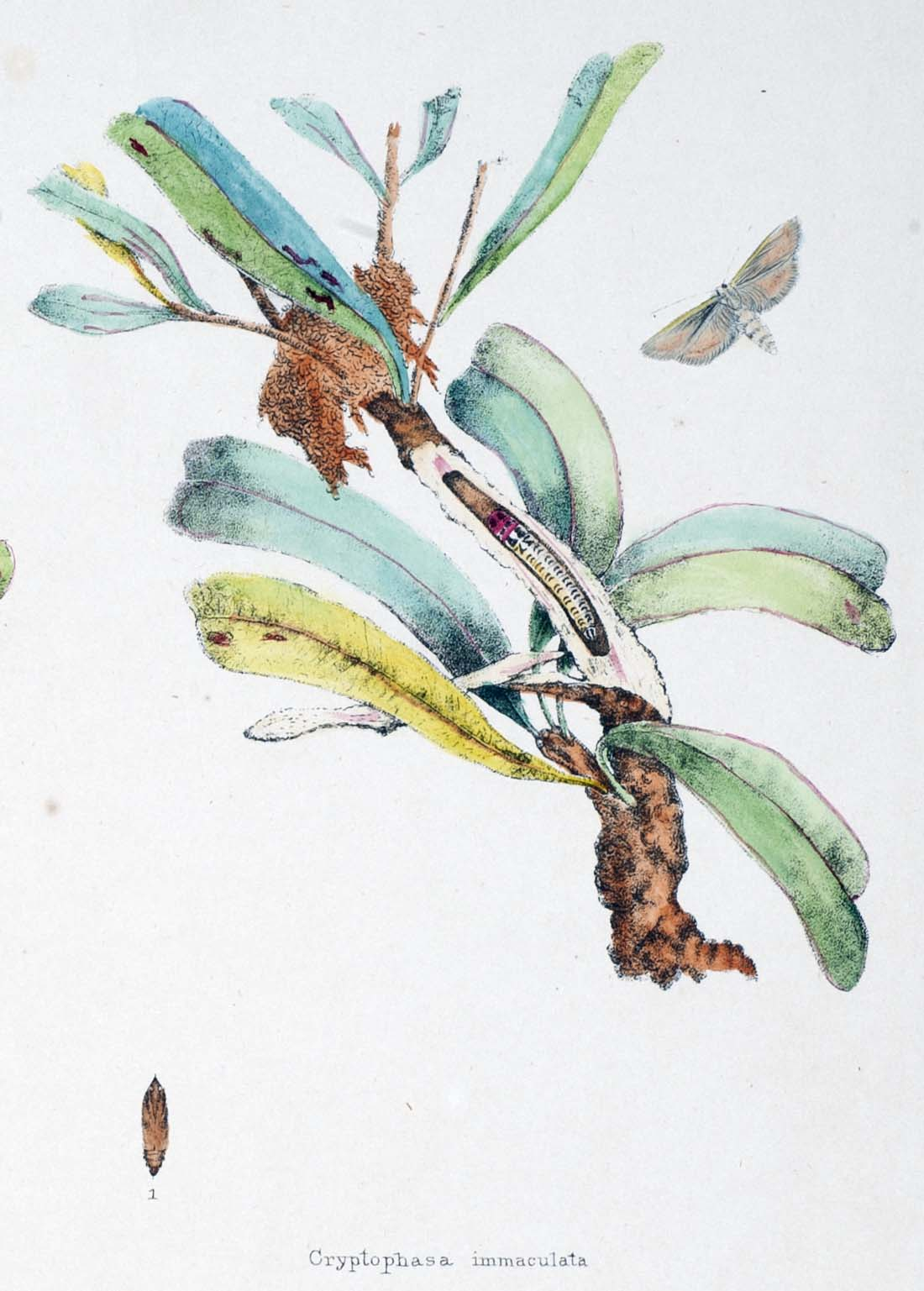
Illustration of the life cycle of Cryptophasa immaculata

Adults are glossy silvery-white.

The larvae feed on Banksia integrifolia. They bore in the stem of their host plant, tying cut leaves at the entrance to the bore.
