= Cryptophasa ochroleuca =

Scientific classification
- Kingdom: Animalia
- Phylum: Arthropoda
- Clade: Pancrustacea
- Class: Insecta
- Order: Lepidoptera
- Family: Xyloryctidae
- Genus: Cryptophasa
- Species: C. ochroleuca

Binomial name
- Cryptophasa ochroleuca (Lower, 1892)

Synonyms
- Cryptophaga ochroleuca Lower, 1892

Species of moth

Cryptophasa ochroleuca is a moth in the family Xyloryctidae. It was described by Oswald Bertram Lower in 1892. It is found in Australia, where it has been recorded from the Australian Capital Territory, New South Wales, South Australia and Victoria.

The wingspan is about 45 mm. The forewings are whitish ochreous with a black dot in the disc at one-third and a second, double, on the fold beneath the middle, and two others transversely placed, and connected by a fine black line in the disc at three-fifths. There is a row of black spots along the hindmargin and the apical fourth of the costa. The hindwings are shining white.

The larvae feed on Eucalyptus species. They bore in the stem of their host plant.
