= Cryptophasa russata =

Scientific classification
- Kingdom: Animalia
- Phylum: Arthropoda
- Clade: Pancrustacea
- Class: Insecta
- Order: Lepidoptera
- Family: Xyloryctidae
- Genus: Cryptophasa
- Species: C. russata

Binomial name
- Cryptophasa russata Butler, 1877

Synonyms
- Nycterobius russata

Species of moth

Cryptophasa russata is a moth in the family Xyloryctidae. It was described by Arthur Gardiner Butler in 1877. It is found in New Guinea and Australia, where it has been recorded from Queensland and New South Wales.

The wingspan is about 50 mm. The forewings are shining ferruginous with the costal border snow white. The base, outer border, outer half of the inner border, and a streak from the outer border through the discocellulars to the centre of the discoidal cell are all slaty greyish. The hindwings are pale ferruginous.
