= Cryptophasa curialis =

Scientific classification
- Kingdom: Animalia
- Phylum: Arthropoda
- Clade: Pancrustacea
- Class: Insecta
- Order: Lepidoptera
- Family: Xyloryctidae
- Genus: Cryptophasa
- Species: C. curialis

Binomial name
- Cryptophasa curialis Meyrick, 1925

Synonyms
- Cryptophasa clarinota Diakonoff, 1954; Cryptophasa pallida Diakonoff, 1954

Species of moth

Cryptophasa curialis is a moth in the family Xyloryctidae. It was described by Edward Meyrick in 1925. It is found on New Guinea.

The wingspan is 36–46 mm. The forewings are glossy white with a median band composed of about eight irregularly placed dark grey spots extending in the disc from near the base to near the terminal fascia, sometimes connected with the costa by a spot near the base and a blotch before the middle, sometimes united by a general grey suffusion extended to the dorsum from near the base to the tornus. There is a rather narrow grey terminal fascia not reaching the costa, marked anteriorly with a series of ill-defined black sublinear marks, and on the terminal edge with a series of small brownish spots. The hindwings are white, sometimes tinged grey on the termen.
