= Cryptophasa chionodes =

Scientific classification
- Kingdom: Animalia
- Phylum: Arthropoda
- Clade: Pancrustacea
- Class: Insecta
- Order: Lepidoptera
- Family: Xyloryctidae
- Genus: Cryptophasa
- Species: C. chionodes

Binomial name
- Cryptophasa chionodes (Turner, 1898)

Synonyms
- Cryptophaga chionodes Turner, 1898

Species of moth

Cryptophasa chionodes is a moth in the family Xyloryctidae. It was described by Alfred Jefferis Turner in 1898. It is found in Australia, where it has been recorded from New South Wales and Queensland.

The wingspan is about 36 mm for males and 57–58 mm for females. The forewings are shining white with a black dot in the disc at three-fifths and a series of black dots along the hindmargin and the apical one-third of the costa. The hindwings are shining white with the extreme base somewhat irrorated with fuscous and a series of black dots along the hindmargin.

The larvae feed on Eucalyptus species. The bore in the stem of their host plant.
