= Stachyneura iostigma =

Scientific classification
- Kingdom: Animalia
- Phylum: Arthropoda
- Clade: Pancrustacea
- Class: Insecta
- Order: Lepidoptera
- Family: Xyloryctidae
- Genus: Stachyneura
- Species: S. iostigma

Binomial name
- Stachyneura iostigma Diakonoff, 1948

Species of moth

Stachyneura iostigma is a moth in the family Xyloryctidae. It was described by Alexey Diakonoff in 1948. It is found in New Guinea.
