= Cryptophasa vacuefacta =

Scientific classification
- Kingdom: Animalia
- Phylum: Arthropoda
- Clade: Pancrustacea
- Class: Insecta
- Order: Lepidoptera
- Family: Xyloryctidae
- Genus: Cryptophasa
- Species: C. vacuefacta

Binomial name
- Cryptophasa vacuefacta Meyrick, 1925

Species of moth

Cryptophasa vacuefacta is a moth in the family Xyloryctidae. It was described by Edward Meyrick in 1925. It is found on New Guinea.

The wingspan is about 46 mm. The forewings are a light brown-yellow color, and the hindwings are white.
