= Cryptophasa chionotarsa =

Scientific classification
- Kingdom: Animalia
- Phylum: Arthropoda
- Clade: Pancrustacea
- Class: Insecta
- Order: Lepidoptera
- Family: Xyloryctidae
- Genus: Cryptophasa
- Species: C. chionotarsa

Binomial name
- Cryptophasa chionotarsa Meyrick, 1925

Species of moth

Cryptophasa chionotarsa is a moth in the family Xyloryctidae. It was described by Edward Meyrick in 1925. It is found on New Guinea.

The wingspan is 42–43 mm. The forewings are rather dark fuscous, on the dorsal half with a few scattered white scales and with a rather thick attenuated suffused dark fuscous dorsal streak. There is an obscure suffused dark fuscous transverse spot on the end of the cell and a patch of white speckling before the termen. The hindwings are grey.
