= Cryptophasa diplosema =

Scientific classification
- Kingdom: Animalia
- Phylum: Arthropoda
- Clade: Pancrustacea
- Class: Insecta
- Order: Lepidoptera
- Family: Xyloryctidae
- Genus: Cryptophasa
- Species: C. diplosema

Binomial name
- Cryptophasa diplosema (Lower, 1903)

Synonyms
- Cryptophaga diplosema Lower, 1903

Species of moth

Cryptophasa diplosema is a moth in the family Xyloryctidae. It was described by Oswald Bertram Lower in 1903. It is found in Australia, where it has been recorded from Queensland.

The wingspan is 40–50 mm. The forewings are reddish ochreous, much paler in males. The costa is moderately pale fleshy white, from the base to two-thirds, broadest on the basal portion. There is a deep red somewhat quadrate patch on the inner margin at one-sixth, reaching half across the wing. A similar patch is found at about the middle and there is a thick, deep red streak from the upper edge of the first spot, longitudinally continued to beyond the second spot. The markings are very obscure in females. The hindwings are orange.
