= Cryptophasa porphyritis =

Scientific classification
- Kingdom: Animalia
- Phylum: Arthropoda
- Clade: Pancrustacea
- Class: Insecta
- Order: Lepidoptera
- Family: Xyloryctidae
- Genus: Cryptophasa
- Species: C. porphyritis

Binomial name
- Cryptophasa porphyritis Turner, 1906

Species of moth

Cryptophasa porphyritis is a moth in the family Xyloryctidae. It was described by Alfred Jefferis Turner in 1906. It is found in Australia, where it has been recorded from Queensland.

The wingspan is about 46 mm. The forewings are pale purple irrorated with reddish-brown, whitish, and a few blackish scales. The costa, from the base to the middle is fuscous and the base from beneath the costa and along the dorsum to one-sixth is broadly white with a blackish discal dot beyond the middle and a triangular white spot on the costa at three-fourths, succeeded by two minute white dots before the apex. There is a subterminal line of blackish dots outlined by reddish-brown and a terminal series of reddish-brown dots. The hindwings are dark fuscous.
