= Cryptophasa citrinopa =

Scientific classification
- Kingdom: Animalia
- Phylum: Arthropoda
- Clade: Pancrustacea
- Class: Insecta
- Order: Lepidoptera
- Family: Xyloryctidae
- Genus: Cryptophasa
- Species: C. citrinopa

Binomial name
- Cryptophasa citrinopa (Lower, 1915)

Synonyms
- Cryptophaga citrinopa Lower, 1915

Species of moth

Cryptophasa citrinopa is a moth in the family Xyloryctidae. It was described by Oswald Bertram Lower in 1915. It is found in Australia, where it has been recorded from New South Wales and Queensland.

The wingspan is about 40 mm. The forewings are orange yellow, faintly dusted with dull reddish on the basal half and with a moderately broad, silvery-white costal streak from the base to the middle, attenuated posteriorly, and edged beneath throughout by a fine fuscous line. There are two dark fuscous discal spots, transversely placed in the middle of the wing at three-fifths from the base. The hindwings are orange yellow.
