= Cryptophasa sepiogramma =

Scientific classification
- Kingdom: Animalia
- Phylum: Arthropoda
- Clade: Pancrustacea
- Class: Insecta
- Order: Lepidoptera
- Family: Xyloryctidae
- Genus: Cryptophasa
- Species: C. sepiogramma

Binomial name
- Cryptophasa sepiogramma Meyrick, 1938

Species of moth

Cryptophasa sepiogramma is a moth in the family Xyloryctidae. It was described by Edward Meyrick in 1938. It is found on New Guinea.
