= Cryptophasa nephrosema =

Scientific classification
- Kingdom: Animalia
- Phylum: Arthropoda
- Clade: Pancrustacea
- Class: Insecta
- Order: Lepidoptera
- Family: Xyloryctidae
- Genus: Cryptophasa
- Species: C. nephrosema

Binomial name
- Cryptophasa nephrosema (Turner, 1898)

Synonyms
- Cryptophaga nephrosema Turner, 1898

Species of moth

Cryptophasa nephrosema is a moth in the family Xyloryctidae. It was described by Alfred Jefferis Turner in 1898. It is found in Australia, where it has been recorded from Queensland and the Northern Territory.

The wingspan is about 35 mm. The forewings are white finely irrorated with pale grey and with three conspicuous blotches in the disc, pale-grey outlined with fuscous. The first is rather obscure near the base, the second before the middle, irregularly constricted at and above the fold and the third beyond the middle, reniform. There are three fuscous spots on the costa, the first at two-fifths nearly confluent with the second blotch, the second and third at three-fifths and four-fifths. There is an ill-defined greyish suffusion between the third blotch and the hindmargin, as well as a row of fuscous dots along the hindmargin. The hindwings are fuscous, towards the base and inner margin whitish.

The larvae feed on Melaleuca species, including Melaleuca leucodendra, Melaleuca quinquenervia and Melaleuca armillaris. They bore in the stem of their host plant.
