= Cryptophasa eumorpha =

Scientific classification
- Kingdom: Animalia
- Phylum: Arthropoda
- Clade: Pancrustacea
- Class: Insecta
- Order: Lepidoptera
- Family: Xyloryctidae
- Genus: Cryptophasa
- Species: C. eumorpha

Binomial name
- Cryptophasa eumorpha (Turner, 1898)

Synonyms
- Cryptophaga eumorpha Turner, 1898; Cryptophasa aggesta Meyrick, 1925

Species of moth

Cryptophasa eumorpha is a moth in the family Xyloryctidae. It was described by Alfred Jefferis Turner in 1898. It is found in New Guinea (Papua, Rook Island and Dampier Island) and Australia, where it has been recorded from Queensland.

The wingspan is 25–48 mm. The forewings are slate-coloured with a black dot in the disc beyond one-third and two in the disc at three-fifths, placed transversely, the upper one almost obsolete. There is a row of black dots along the hind margin and apical one-third of the costa. The hindwings are pale greyish-fuscous with a series of black dots along the hindmargin. Between the dots, the hind margin is whitish.
