= Cryptophasa semnocrana =

Scientific classification
- Kingdom: Animalia
- Phylum: Arthropoda
- Clade: Pancrustacea
- Class: Insecta
- Order: Lepidoptera
- Family: Xyloryctidae
- Genus: Cryptophasa
- Species: C. semnocrana

Binomial name
- Cryptophasa semnocrana Meyrick, 1928

Species of moth

Cryptophasa semnocrana is a moth in the family Xyloryctidae. It was described by Edward Meyrick in 1928. It is found on New Britain in Papua New Guinea.

The wingspan is about 54 mm. The forewings are white with some thinly scattered black specks and a moderate suffused light brown costal band throughout, sprinkled with black. There is a narrow transverse blackish bar on the end of the cell and a terminal series of small black dots. The hindwings are grey, the dorsal hairs are light brownish ochreous.
