= Cryptophasa nymphidias =

Scientific classification
- Kingdom: Animalia
- Phylum: Arthropoda
- Clade: Pancrustacea
- Class: Insecta
- Order: Lepidoptera
- Family: Xyloryctidae
- Genus: Cryptophasa
- Species: C. nymphidias

Binomial name
- Cryptophasa nymphidias Turner, 1926

Species of moth

Cryptophasa nymphidias is a moth in the family Xyloryctidae. It was described by Alfred Jefferis Turner in 1926. It is found in Australia.

Adults are pure white.
