= Cryptophasa amphicroca =

Scientific classification
- Kingdom: Animalia
- Phylum: Arthropoda
- Clade: Pancrustacea
- Class: Insecta
- Order: Lepidoptera
- Family: Xyloryctidae
- Genus: Cryptophasa
- Species: C. amphicroca

Binomial name
- Cryptophasa amphicroca Meyrick, 1925

Species of moth

Cryptophasa amphicroca is a moth in the family Xyloryctidae. It was described by Edward Meyrick in 1925. It is found on New Guinea.

The wingspan is about 41 mm. The forewings are glossy white with an orange-ochreous costal line, slender interneural lines between 8-10 not reaching the margin, a median streak from one-fourth to near the termen, and a line along the fold. The dorsal edge is finely ochreous on the median third. The hindwings are white.
