= Arignota =

Scientific classification
- Kingdom: Animalia
- Phylum: Arthropoda
- Class: Insecta
- Order: Lepidoptera
- Family: Xyloryctidae
- Genus: Arignota; Turner, 1898

Moth genus in family Xyloryctidae

Arignota is a genus of moths of the family Xyloryctidae.

== Species ==
- Arignota clavatrix (Diakonoff, 1954)
- Arignota decipiens Diakonoff, 1954
- Arignota stercorata (Lucas, 1894)
