= Cryptophasa atecmarta =

Scientific classification
- Kingdom: Animalia
- Phylum: Arthropoda
- Clade: Pancrustacea
- Class: Insecta
- Order: Lepidoptera
- Family: Xyloryctidae
- Genus: Cryptophasa
- Species: C. atecmarta

Binomial name
- Cryptophasa atecmarta Turner, 1917

Species of moth

Cryptophasa atecmarta is a moth in the family Xyloryctidae. It was described by Alfred Jefferis Turner in 1917. It is found in Australia, where it has been recorded from New South Wales, Queensland and Western Australia.

The wingspan is about 32 mm. The forewings are grey with sparse fuscous irroration and indistinct markings. There is a fuscous dot in the disc at one-fourth, a second in the middle and a third at three-fourths. This last dot forms the apex of a darker shape, the terminal area being paler grey. The hindwings are pale fuscous.

The larvae bore the stem of Hakea leucoptera.
