= Cryptophasa neocrates =

Scientific classification
- Kingdom: Animalia
- Phylum: Arthropoda
- Clade: Pancrustacea
- Class: Insecta
- Order: Lepidoptera
- Family: Xyloryctidae
- Genus: Cryptophasa
- Species: C. neocrates

Binomial name
- Cryptophasa neocrates Meyrick, 1925

Species of moth

Cryptophasa neocrates is a moth in the family Xyloryctidae. It was described by Edward Meyrick in 1925. It is found on New Guinea.

The wingspan is about 46 mm. The forewings are shining white with the first discal stigma very small and black and with minute black dots on the terminal ends of veins 2 and 3. The hindwings are white.
