= Cryptophasa antalba =

Scientific classification
- Kingdom: Animalia
- Phylum: Arthropoda
- Clade: Pancrustacea
- Class: Insecta
- Order: Lepidoptera
- Family: Xyloryctidae
- Genus: Cryptophasa
- Species: C. antalba

Binomial name
- Cryptophasa antalba Diakonoff, 1966

Synonyms
- Cryptophasa proleuca Diakonoff, 1948 (preocc. Meyrick, 1890)

Species of moth

Cryptophasa antalba is a moth in the family Xyloryctidae. It was described by Alexey Diakonoff in 1966. It is found in New Guinea.
