= Cryptophasa niphadobela =

Scientific classification
- Kingdom: Animalia
- Phylum: Arthropoda
- Clade: Pancrustacea
- Class: Insecta
- Order: Lepidoptera
- Family: Xyloryctidae
- Genus: Cryptophasa
- Species: C. niphadobela

Binomial name
- Cryptophasa niphadobela Diakonoff, 1954

Species of moth

Cryptophasa niphadobela is a moth in the family Xyloryctidae. It was described by Alexey Diakonoff in 1954. It is found in New Guinea.
