= Cryptophasa stenoleuca =

Scientific classification
- Kingdom: Animalia
- Phylum: Arthropoda
- Clade: Pancrustacea
- Class: Insecta
- Order: Lepidoptera
- Family: Xyloryctidae
- Genus: Cryptophasa
- Species: C. stenoleuca

Binomial name
- Cryptophasa stenoleuca (Lower, 1894)

Synonyms
- Cryptophaga stenoleuca Lower, 1894

Species of moth

Cryptophasa stenoleuca is a moth in the family Xyloryctidae. It was described by Oswald Bertram Lower in 1894. It is found in Australia, where it has been recorded from New South Wales, the Northern Territory, Queensland and Western Australia.

The wingspan is about 40 mm for males and 47 mm for females. The forewings are fuscous, finely irrorated (sprinkled) with black scales and with a narrow whitish streak along the costa from very near the base almost to the apex, attenuated at the extremities. There are two very suffused and hardly traceable small dark-fuscous patches in the centre of the wing and two from near the middle. The hindwings are snow white, infuscated (darkened) along the hindmargin and apical half of the wing.

The larvae feed on Grevillea striata. They bore in the stem of their host plant.
