= Cryptophasa xylomima =

Scientific classification
- Kingdom: Animalia
- Phylum: Arthropoda
- Clade: Pancrustacea
- Class: Insecta
- Order: Lepidoptera
- Family: Xyloryctidae
- Genus: Cryptophasa
- Species: C. xylomima

Binomial name
- Cryptophasa xylomima Turner, 1906

Synonyms
- Caenorycta xylomima

Species of moth

Cryptophasa xylomima is a moth in the family Xyloryctidae. It was described by Alfred Jefferis Turner in 1906. It is found in Australia, where it has been recorded from northern Queensland, from Cape York south to near Townsville. It is also found in Papua New Guinea

The wingspan is 44–50 mm. The forewings are whitish, the costal third suffused with ochreous-grey, with sparse general irroration of blackish scales and a transverse discal blackish mark before two-thirds. There is a terminal series of dark-fuscous dots. The hindwings are pale-ochreous.
