= Cryptophasa oecodoma =

Scientific classification
- Kingdom: Animalia
- Phylum: Arthropoda
- Clade: Pancrustacea
- Class: Insecta
- Order: Lepidoptera
- Family: Xyloryctidae
- Genus: Cryptophasa
- Species: C. oecodoma

Binomial name
- Cryptophasa oecodoma Meyrick, 1930

Species of moth

Cryptophasa oecodoma is a moth in the family Xyloryctidae. It was described by Edward Meyrick in 1930. It is found on New Guinea.
