= Cryptophasa sarcinota =

Scientific classification
- Kingdom: Animalia
- Phylum: Arthropoda
- Clade: Pancrustacea
- Class: Insecta
- Order: Lepidoptera
- Family: Xyloryctidae
- Genus: Cryptophasa
- Species: C. sarcinota

Binomial name
- Cryptophasa sarcinota (Meyrick, 1890)

Synonyms
- Cryptophaga sarcinota Meyrick, 1890

Species of moth

Cryptophasa sarcinota is a moth in the family Xyloryctidae. It was described by Edward Meyrick in 1890. It is found in Australia, where it has been recorded from Queensland.

The wingspan is about 35–53 mm. (about 1.15-1.75 ft) The forewings are pale greyish ochreous, brownish tinged and with a large black dot in the disc at one-third, a second on the fold beneath the middle, and two others transversely obliquely placed, and sometimes connected by a fine line in the disc at three-fifths, the lower anterior. There is a row of black dots along the hindmargin and apical half of the costa. The hindwings are fuscous, tinged with blackish towards the basal third, the base with ochreous-whitish hairs.

The larvae feed on Eucalyptus species. They bore in the stem of their host plant.
