= Cryptophasa blosyra =

Scientific classification
- Kingdom: Animalia
- Phylum: Arthropoda
- Clade: Pancrustacea
- Class: Insecta
- Order: Lepidoptera
- Family: Xyloryctidae
- Genus: Cryptophasa
- Species: C. blosyra

Binomial name
- Cryptophasa blosyra Turner, 1917

Species of moth

Cryptophasa blosyra is a moth in the family Xyloryctidae. It was described by Alfred Jefferis Turner in 1917. It is found in Australia, where it has been recorded from Queensland.

The wingspan is 43–44 mm. The forewings are grey-whitish with a few fuscous and blackish scales. These form a dark streak along the fold not reaching the tornus, and a median streak from one-fifth to four-fifths. There is an ochreous grey annular mark at three-fifths interrupting the median streak. There is an ochreous grey submarginal line feebly barred with blackish. The hindwings are pale fuscous, whitish on the costa.
