= Stachyneura =

Scientific classification
- Domain: Eukaryota
- Kingdom: Animalia
- Phylum: Arthropoda
- Class: Insecta
- Order: Lepidoptera
- Family: Xyloryctidae
- Genus: Stachyneura; Diakonoff, 1948

Moth genus in family Xyloryctidae

Stachyneura is a genus of moths of the family Xyloryctidae.

== Species ==
- Stachyneura iostigma Diakonoff, 1948
- Stachyneura sceliphrodes (Meyrick, 1925)
