= Cryptophasa argyrocolla =

Scientific classification
- Kingdom: Animalia
- Phylum: Arthropoda
- Clade: Pancrustacea
- Class: Insecta
- Order: Lepidoptera
- Family: Xyloryctidae
- Genus: Cryptophasa
- Species: C. argyrocolla

Binomial name
- Cryptophasa argyrocolla Turner, 1917

Species of moth

Cryptophasa argyrocolla is a moth in the family Xyloryctidae. It was described by Alfred Jefferis Turner in 1917. It is found in Australia, where it has been recorded from Western Australia.

The wingspan is 30–36 mm. The forewings have a broad silvery white costal streak from one-eight to the apex, broadest at one-fourth from the base, there angled and gradually narrowing to a point at the apex. There is a broad brownish suffusion beneath the costal streak towards the base and a transversely oval, black-edged, brownish spot at two-thirds, indenting the costal streak. Some whitish suffusion is found before the tornus and there is a blackish dentate subterminal line, edged posteriorly with brownish. The hindwings are grey.
