= Cryptophasa lasiocosma =

Scientific classification
- Kingdom: Animalia
- Phylum: Arthropoda
- Clade: Pancrustacea
- Class: Insecta
- Order: Lepidoptera
- Family: Xyloryctidae
- Genus: Cryptophasa
- Species: C. lasiocosma

Binomial name
- Cryptophasa lasiocosma (Lower, 1908)

Synonyms
- Cryptophaga lasiocosma Lower, 1908; Cryptophasa pentasticta Turner, 1917

Species of moth

Cryptophasa lasiocosma is a moth in the family Xyloryctidae. It was described by Oswald Bertram Lower in 1908. It is found in Australia, where it has been recorded from Queensland and New South Wales.

The wingspan is 43–54 mm. The forewings are shining snow white with black markings. There is a spot near the base and a larger one in the cell at two-fifths, and another on the fold in the middle. There are also one or two black scales near the tornus. The hindwings are shining snow white.
