= Cryptophasa phaethontia =

Scientific classification
- Kingdom: Animalia
- Phylum: Arthropoda
- Clade: Pancrustacea
- Class: Insecta
- Order: Lepidoptera
- Family: Xyloryctidae
- Genus: Cryptophasa
- Species: C. phaethontia

Binomial name
- Cryptophasa phaethontia (Meyrick, 1890)

Synonyms
- Cryptophaga phaethontia Meyrick, 1890

Species of moth

Cryptophasa phaethontia is a moth in the family Xyloryctidae. It was described by Edward Meyrick in 1890. It is found in Australia, where it has been recorded from Queensland.

The wingspan is about 41 mm. The forewings are deep brown reddish and the hindwings are pale ochreous, slightly reddish tinged.
