= Cryptophasa flavolineata =

Scientific classification
- Kingdom: Animalia
- Phylum: Arthropoda
- Clade: Pancrustacea
- Class: Insecta
- Order: Lepidoptera
- Family: Xyloryctidae
- Genus: Cryptophasa
- Species: C. flavolineata

Binomial name
- Cryptophasa flavolineata (Walker, 1864)

Synonyms
- Cryptolechia flavolineata Walker, 1864

Species of moth

Cryptophasa flavolineata is a moth in the family Xyloryctidae. It was described by Francis Walker in 1864. It is found in Papua New Guinea and Australia, where it has been recorded from New South Wales and Queensland.

The wingspan is about 50 mm. The forewings are snow-white with a faint pale-yellowish central longitudinal line from before the middle of the disc almost to the hind margin. There is a suffused ochreous-yellow line along the submedian fold from the base to the anal angle and a short slender ochreous-yellow streak along the inner margin about one-third. The hindwings are snow white.

The larvae feed on Banksia integrifolia and Syzygium oleosum. They bore in the stem of their host plant, tying cut leaves at the entrance to the bore.
