= Cryptophasa psilocrossa =

Scientific classification
- Kingdom: Animalia
- Phylum: Arthropoda
- Clade: Pancrustacea
- Class: Insecta
- Order: Lepidoptera
- Family: Xyloryctidae
- Genus: Cryptophasa
- Species: C. psilocrossa

Binomial name
- Cryptophasa psilocrossa Turner, 1902

Species of moth

Cryptophasa psilocrossa is a moth in the family Xyloryctidae. It was described by Alfred Jefferis Turner in 1902. It is found in Australia, where it has been recorded from Queensland.

The wingspan is about 35 mm. The forewings are ochreous brown with five blackish dots in the disc, the first in the disc beyond one-third and the second in the disc at two-thirds. The third is found before and beneath the second and the fourth and fifth are close together, above and beneath the fold, equidistant from the tarsi and the third. There is an interrupted blackish line on the lower two-thirds of the hindmargin. The hindwings are dark fuscous with a narrow strip denuded of scales from the apex along the apical half of hindmargin.

The larvae feed on Eucalyptus species.
