= Cryptophasa nigricincta =

Scientific classification
- Kingdom: Animalia
- Phylum: Arthropoda
- Clade: Pancrustacea
- Class: Insecta
- Order: Lepidoptera
- Family: Xyloryctidae
- Genus: Cryptophasa
- Species: C. nigricincta

Binomial name
- Cryptophasa nigricincta (Turner, 1898)

Synonyms
- Cryptophaga nigricincta Turner, 1898

Species of moth

Cryptophasa nigricincta is a moth in the family Xyloryctidae. It was described by Alfred Jefferis Turner in 1898. It is found in Australia, where it has been recorded from Queensland.

The wingspan is 25–30 mm for males and 40–45 mm for females. The forewings of the males are dark slate-coloured and with a large black dot in the disc at beyond one-third, and two placed transversely in the disc at two-fifths. There is a row of black dots along the hindmargin and the apical one-fourth of the costa. The hindwings are blackish. Females have clear white forewings with a black dot in the disc beyond one-third, and two in the disc at three-fifths placed transversely, the lower rather posterior. There is a series of black dots along the hindmargin and the apical one-third of the costa. The hindwings are white, sometimes irregularly suffused with fuscous and there is a row of black dots along the hindmargin.

The larvae feed on Eucalyptus species. They bore in the stem of their host plant.
