= Cryptophasa crocochorda =

Scientific classification
- Kingdom: Animalia
- Phylum: Arthropoda
- Clade: Pancrustacea
- Class: Insecta
- Order: Lepidoptera
- Family: Xyloryctidae
- Genus: Cryptophasa
- Species: C. crocochorda

Binomial name
- Cryptophasa crocochorda Meyrick, 1925

Species of moth

Cryptophasa crocochorda is a moth in the family Xyloryctidae. It was described by Edward Meyrick in 1925. It is found on New Guinea.

The wingspan is about 57 mm. The forewings are whitish yellowish with an orange-fulvous pointed streak along the basal third of the costa, the costal edge is fuscous throughout. A narrow light fulvous-orange median streak is found from one-fourth almost to the termen, and a slender one along the fold throughout. The hindwings are white.
