= Cryptophasa zorodes =

Scientific classification
- Kingdom: Animalia
- Phylum: Arthropoda
- Clade: Pancrustacea
- Class: Insecta
- Order: Lepidoptera
- Family: Xyloryctidae
- Genus: Cryptophasa
- Species: C. zorodes

Binomial name
- Cryptophasa zorodes Turner, 1917

Species of moth

Cryptophasa zorodes is a moth in the family Xyloryctidae. It was described by Alfred Jefferis Turner in 1917. It is found in Australia, where it has been recorded from the Northern Territory.

The wingspan is about 48 mm. The forewings are pale grey and the hindwings are grey-whitish.
