= Cryptophasa ensigera =

Scientific classification
- Kingdom: Animalia
- Phylum: Arthropoda
- Clade: Pancrustacea
- Class: Insecta
- Order: Lepidoptera
- Family: Xyloryctidae
- Genus: Cryptophasa
- Species: C. ensigera

Binomial name
- Cryptophasa ensigera Meyrick, 1925

Species of moth

Cryptophasa ensigera is a moth in the family Xyloryctidae. It was described by Edward Meyrick in 1925. It is found on New Guinea.

The wingspan is 36–38 mm. The forewings are pale ochreous, somewhat mixed irregularly with light reddish fuscous, sometimes with a few scattered dark fuscous specks. There is a broad white attenuated costal streak from the base to beyond the middle, edged beneath by a slender reddish-fuscous streak continued along the costa to the apex, the costal edge also more or less reddish fuscous towards the base. There is a rather suffused semi-oval reddish-fuscous blotch extending along the dorsum from about one-fourth to near the tornus. The hindwings are light red brownish.
