= Cryptophasa phaeochtha =

Scientific classification
- Kingdom: Animalia
- Phylum: Arthropoda
- Clade: Pancrustacea
- Class: Insecta
- Order: Lepidoptera
- Family: Xyloryctidae
- Genus: Cryptophasa
- Species: C. phaeochtha

Binomial name
- Cryptophasa phaeochtha Meyrick, 1925

Species of moth

Cryptophasa phaeochtha is a moth in the family Xyloryctidae. It was described by Edward Meyrick in 1925. It is found on New Guinea.

The wingspan is 40–50 mm. The forewings are whitish ochreous with a suffused fuscous band occupying the costal third, darker towards the costa. The hindwings are light ochreous yellowish.
