= Cryptophasa panleuca =

Scientific classification
- Kingdom: Animalia
- Phylum: Arthropoda
- Clade: Pancrustacea
- Class: Insecta
- Order: Lepidoptera
- Family: Xyloryctidae
- Genus: Cryptophasa
- Species: C. panleuca

Binomial name
- Cryptophasa panleuca Lower, 1901

Synonyms
- Cryptophaga panleuca Lower, 1901

Species of moth

Cryptophasa panleuca is a moth in the family Xyloryctidae. It was described by Oswald Bertram Lower in 1901. It is found in Australia, where it has been recorded from Queensland.

The wingspan is 31–44 mm. The forewings are white without markings. The hindwings are shining snow white and there is a row of black dots along the termen.

The larvae feed on Lophostemon species.
