= Cryptophasa hormocrossa =

Scientific classification
- Kingdom: Animalia
- Phylum: Arthropoda
- Clade: Pancrustacea
- Class: Insecta
- Order: Lepidoptera
- Family: Xyloryctidae
- Genus: Cryptophasa
- Species: C. hormocrossa

Binomial name
- Cryptophasa hormocrossa Meyrick, 1925

Species of moth

Cryptophasa hormocrossa is a moth in the family Xyloryctidae. It was described by Edward Meyrick in 1925. It is found on New Guinea.

The wingspan is 40–44 mm. The forewings are brown, irregularly sprinkled with dark fuscous and with an undefined quadrate patch of dark fuscous suffusion resting on the costa before the middle and sometimes a suffused dark fuscous streak along the dorsum from near the base to three-fourths. There is a small dark fuscous spot near the base in the middle, and two connected by a line on the angles of the cell. A band of whitish suffusion is found before the termen from the dorsum reaching three-fourths of the way across the wing, above this a blotch of dark fuscous suffusion towards the costa. The hindwings are fuscous.
