= Cryptophasa balteata =

Scientific classification
- Kingdom: Animalia
- Phylum: Arthropoda
- Clade: Pancrustacea
- Class: Insecta
- Order: Lepidoptera
- Family: Xyloryctidae
- Genus: Cryptophasa
- Species: C. balteata

Binomial name
- Cryptophasa balteata (Walker, 1866)

Synonyms
- Zitua balteata Walker, 1866; Cryptophaga lurida Meyrick, 1890; Cryptophaga acroleuca Turner, 1898

Species of moth

Cryptophasa balteata is a moth in the family Xyloryctidae. It was described by Francis Walker in 1866. It is found in Australia, where it has been recorded from New South Wales, Queensland and South Australia.

The wingspan is 32–34 mm for males and 40–62 mm for females. The forewings of the males are dark ochreous brown, with a dark dot in the disc at one-third and a second, sometimes double on the fold below the middle, and two placed transversely in the disc at three-fifths, the lower somewhat anterior. Three black dots are found on the apical one-third of the costa, sometimes obsolete. There is a narrow black line along the hindmargin, sometimes interrupted. The hindwings are dark fuscous, blackish towards the base. Females have pale ochreous-brown forewings, along the costa inclining to whitish. The discal dots are as in males, and there is a row of black dots along the hindmargin and apical one-fifth of the costa, sometimes inclining to be obsolete. The hindwings of the females are fuscous at the base, gradually passing into whitish over the apical third of the disc, on which the veins are outlined in fuscous.

The larvae feed on Eucalyptus eugenioides, Eucalyptus microcorys, Eucalyptus tereticornis, Eucalyptus saligna and Eucalyptus viminalis. They bore in the stem of their host plant, tying cut leaves to the bore entrance.
