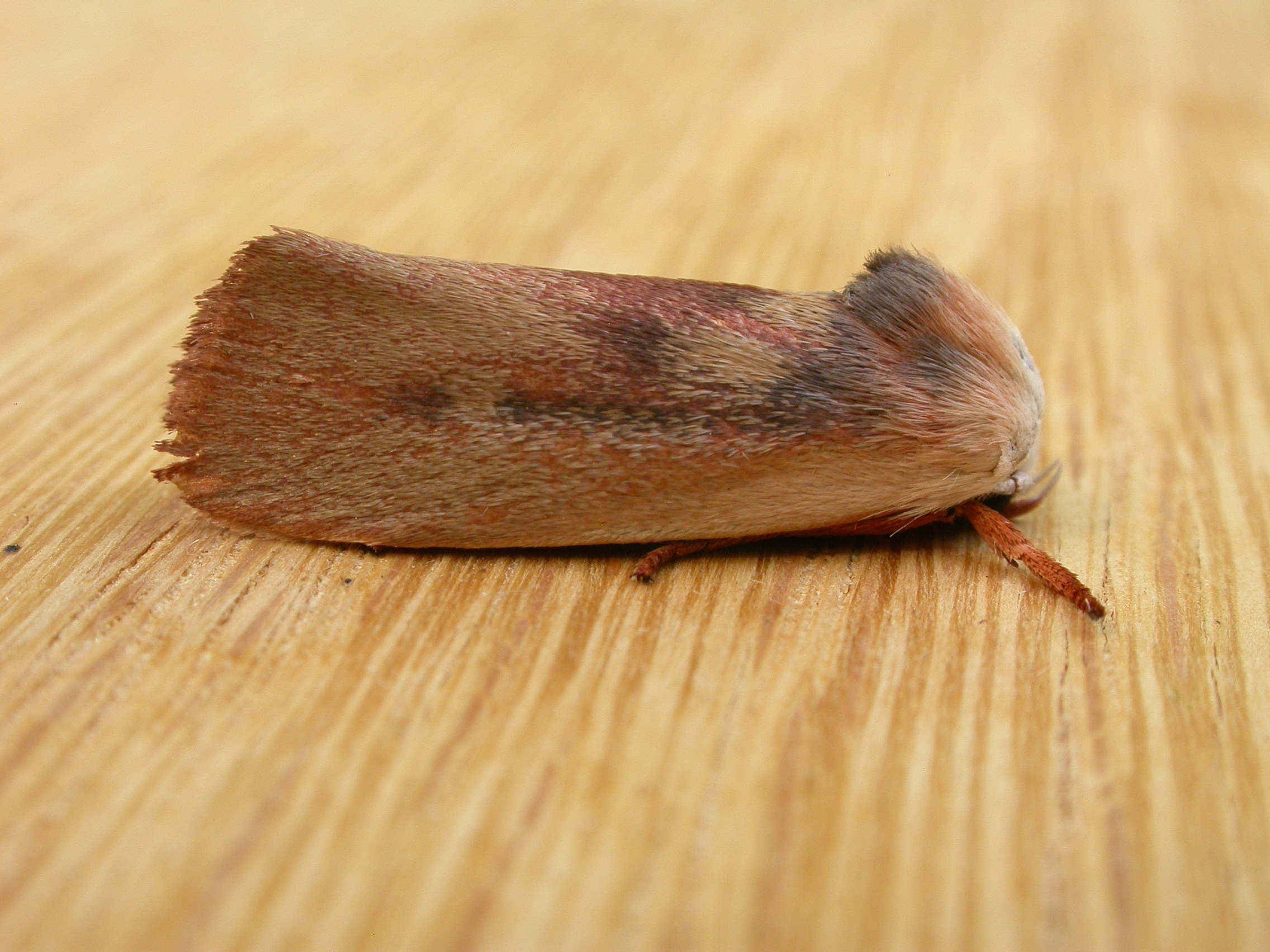

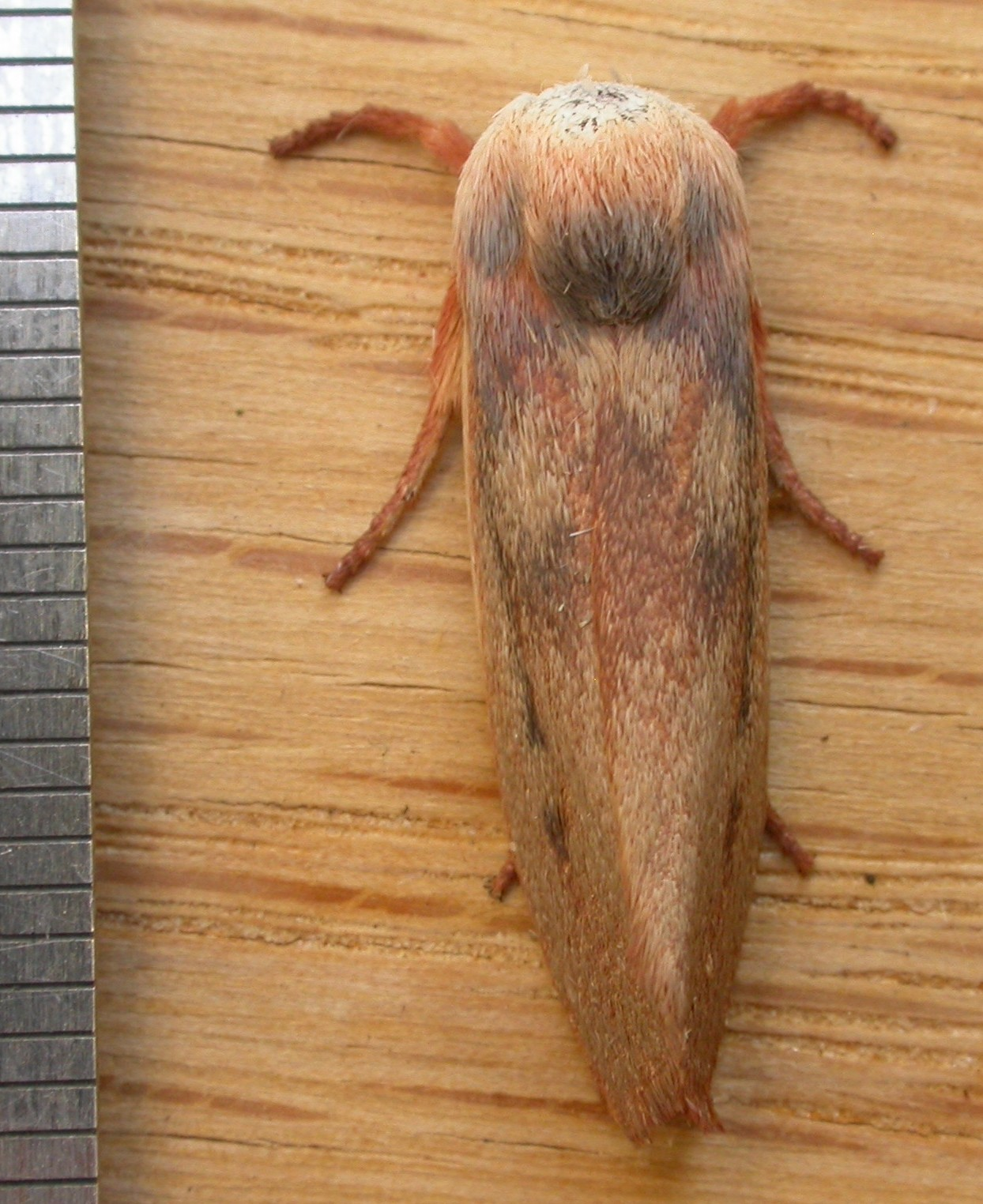

Scientific classification
- Kingdom: Animalia
- Phylum: Arthropoda
- Clade: Pancrustacea
- Class: Insecta
- Order: Lepidoptera
- Family: Xyloryctidae
- Genus: Cryptophasa
- Species: C. rubescens

Binomial name
- Cryptophasa rubescens Lewin, 1805

Synonyms
- Cryptophasa sarcoxantha Meyrick, 1937

= Cryptophasa rubescens =

Species of moth

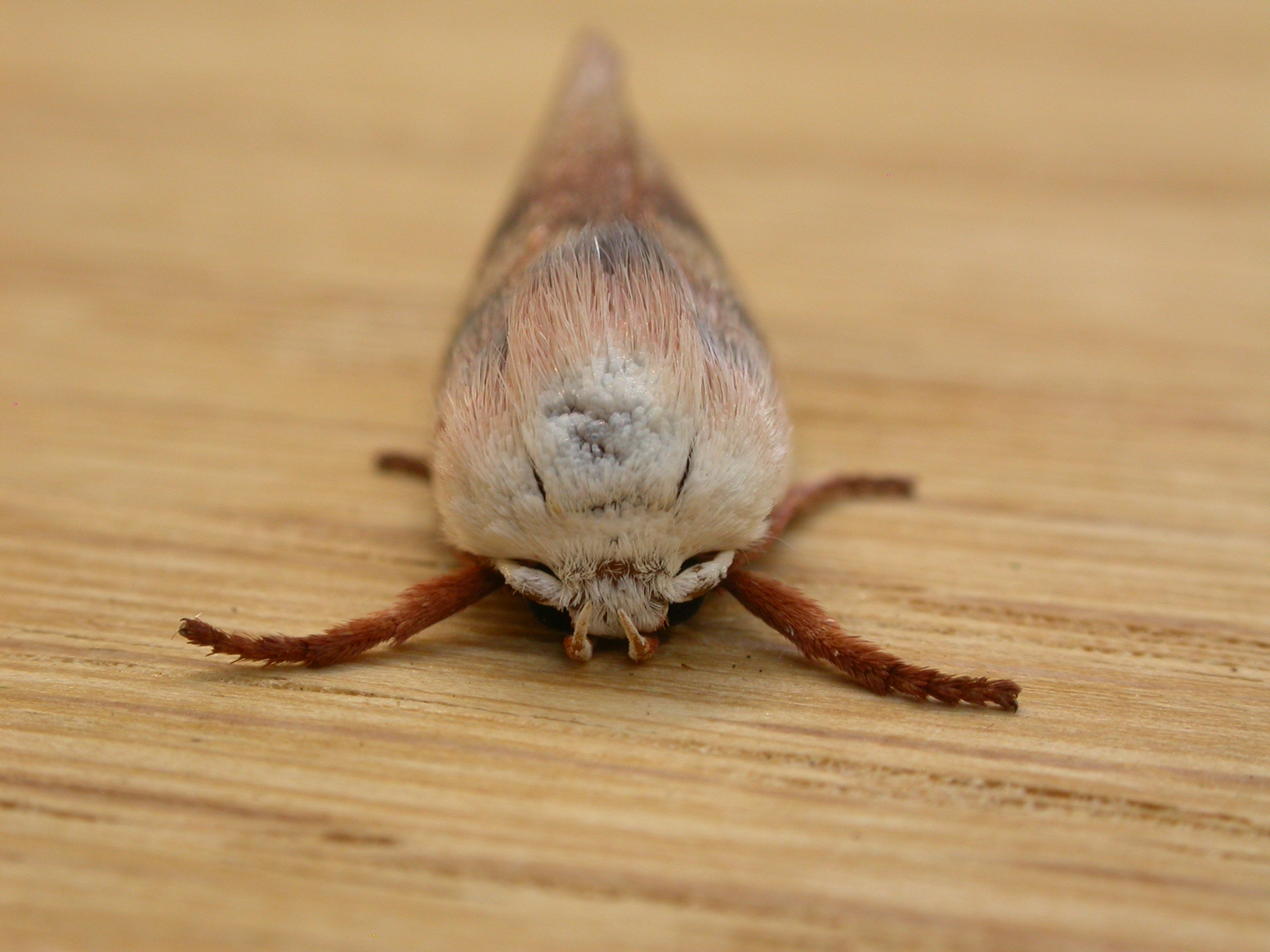

Cryptophasa rubescens is a moth of the family Xyloryctidae. It is found in Australia, where it has been recorded from New South Wales, Queensland and Victoria.

The wingspan is about 45 mm. The forewings are ferruginous, irrorated with elongate light brownish-ochreous scales and with the costa broadly suffused with pale ochreous from the base to beyond the middle, attenuated to a point posteriorly. There is a short obscure dark fuscous dash on the submedian fold at one-fourth, and another beyond the middle. A small roundish ill-defined dark fuscous spot is found in the disc at five-eights, and another at three-fourths, more elongate. The hindwings are ochreous-orange, somewhat paler posteriorly.

The larvae feed on Acacia species, including Acacia longifolia and Acacia linifolia. They bore in the stem of their host plant, tying cut phyllodes at the entrance to the bore.
