= Cryptophasa platypedimela =

Scientific classification
- Kingdom: Animalia
- Phylum: Arthropoda
- Clade: Pancrustacea
- Class: Insecta
- Order: Lepidoptera
- Family: Xyloryctidae
- Genus: Cryptophasa
- Species: C. platypedimela

Binomial name
- Cryptophasa platypedimela (Lower, 1894)

Synonyms
- Cryptophaga platypedimela Lower, 1894

Species of moth

Cryptophasa platypedimela is a moth in the family Xyloryctidae. It was described by Oswald Bertram Lower in 1894. It is found in Australia, where it has been recorded from Queensland.

The wingspan is about 42 mm. The forewings are white, sparsely strigulated with faint transverse purplish striga (lines). There is a purplish-fuscous broad basal patch, its outer edge straight from one-sixth costa to one-sixth of the inner margin, leaving a patch of ground colour at the extreme base. A large purplish-ferruginous discal spot is found beyond the middle and there is a narrow irregularly dentate hindmarginal fascia which is broadest at the apex. The hindwings are pale yellow.
