= Cryptophasa argyrias =

Scientific classification
- Kingdom: Animalia
- Phylum: Arthropoda
- Clade: Pancrustacea
- Class: Insecta
- Order: Lepidoptera
- Family: Xyloryctidae
- Genus: Cryptophasa
- Species: C. argyrias

Binomial name
- Cryptophasa argyrias Turner, 1906

Species of moth

Cryptophasa argyrias is a moth in the family Xyloryctidae. It was described by Alfred Jefferis Turner in 1906. It is found in Australia, where it has been recorded from Queensland.

The wingspan is about 60 mm. The forewings are shining silvery white with a dark-fuscous line along the costal and terminal edge, broader on the latter. The hindwings are ochreous-whitish-grey with the terminal edge fuscous.
