= Cryptophasa tetrazona =

Scientific classification
- Kingdom: Animalia
- Phylum: Arthropoda
- Clade: Pancrustacea
- Class: Insecta
- Order: Lepidoptera
- Family: Xyloryctidae
- Genus: Cryptophasa
- Species: C. tetrazona

Binomial name
- Cryptophasa tetrazona (Lower, 1901)

Synonyms
- Xylorycta tetrazona Lower, 1901

Species of moth

Cryptophasa tetrazona is a moth in the family Xyloryctidae. It was described by Oswald Bertram Lower in 1901. It is found in Australia, where it has been recorded from New South Wales, Queensland, Victoria and Western Australia.

The wingspan is about 30 mm. The forewings are white, with fuscous markings. There is a narrow streak along the costa from the base to before the third fascia and there are four moderately broad nearly equidistant fasciae, the first near the base, narrowest in the middle. The second is somewhat curved inwardly from the middle of the costa, to the inner margin. The third is found from the costa at five-sixths to just before the anal angle, nearly straight. The fourth is found along the termen. Between the third and fourth are two fuscous spots on the costa and there is an irregular suffused streak on the inner margin between the second and third fasciae. The hindwings are orange yellow, becoming broadly fuscous from the apex to beyond the middle of the termen, finely attenuated posteriorly.
