= Cryptophasa stochastis =

Scientific classification
- Kingdom: Animalia
- Phylum: Arthropoda
- Clade: Pancrustacea
- Class: Insecta
- Order: Lepidoptera
- Family: Xyloryctidae
- Genus: Cryptophasa
- Species: C. stochastis

Binomial name
- Cryptophasa stochastis (Meyrick, 1890)

Synonyms
- Cryptophaga stochastis Meyrick, 1890

Species of moth

Cryptophasa stochastis is a moth in the family Xyloryctidae. It was described by Edward Meyrick in 1890. It is found in Australia, where it has been recorded from Western Australia.

The wingspan is 27–33 mm. The forewings are ashy grey, thinly sprinkled with blackish. There is a dark grey dot near the base in the middle and about five indistinct cloudy dark-grey dots in a longitudinal series in the disc from one-fourth to three-fourths, the last subcrescentic. A small cloudy subquadrate dark-grey spot is found beneath the fourth dot, sometimes connected indistinctly with the third. The hindwings are dark, with the base paler and whitish tinged.

The larvae feed on Hakea species. They bore in the stem of their host plant.
