= Cryptophasa malevolens =

Scientific classification
- Kingdom: Animalia
- Phylum: Arthropoda
- Clade: Pancrustacea
- Class: Insecta
- Order: Lepidoptera
- Family: Xyloryctidae
- Genus: Cryptophasa
- Species: C. malevolens

Binomial name
- Cryptophasa malevolens Meyrick, 1928

Species of moth

Cryptophasa malevolens is a moth in the family Xyloryctidae. It was described by Edward Meyrick in 1928. It is found on New Guinea.

The wingspan is 41–43 mm. The forewings are violet fuscous, slightly sprinkled darker and with a suffused dark fuscous dorsal streak from about one-third to the tornus, as well as a black transverse mark on the end of the cell. The hindwings are dark fuscous.
