= Cryptophasa argophanta =

Scientific classification
- Kingdom: Animalia
- Phylum: Arthropoda
- Clade: Pancrustacea
- Class: Insecta
- Order: Lepidoptera
- Family: Xyloryctidae
- Genus: Cryptophasa
- Species: C. argophanta

Binomial name
- Cryptophasa argophanta Meyrick, 1917

Species of moth

Cryptophasa argophanta is a moth in the family Xyloryctidae. It was described by Edward Meyrick in 1917. It is found on New Guinea (Yule Island) and on the Moluccas (Ambon Island).

The wingspan is about 38 mm. The forewings are shining white and the stigmata are black, the plical midway between the first and second discal, one or two black scales beneath the second discal and a marginal series of 12 or 13 black dots around the posterior part of the costa and termen. The hindwings are white.
