= Cryptophasa psathyra =

Scientific classification
- Kingdom: Animalia
- Phylum: Arthropoda
- Clade: Pancrustacea
- Class: Insecta
- Order: Lepidoptera
- Family: Xyloryctidae
- Genus: Cryptophasa
- Species: C. psathyra

Binomial name
- Cryptophasa psathyra (Diakonoff, 1948)

Synonyms
- Acria psathyra Diakonoff, 1948

Species of moth

Cryptophasa psathyra is a moth in the family Xyloryctidae. It was described by Alexey Diakonoff in 1948. It is found in New Guinea.
