= Cryptophasa byssinopis =

Scientific classification
- Kingdom: Animalia
- Phylum: Arthropoda
- Clade: Pancrustacea
- Class: Insecta
- Order: Lepidoptera
- Family: Xyloryctidae
- Genus: Cryptophasa
- Species: C. byssinopis

Binomial name
- Cryptophasa byssinopis Turner, 1902

Species of moth

Cryptophasa byssinopis is a moth in the family Xyloryctidae. It was described by Alfred Jefferis Turner in 1902. It is found in Australia, where it has been recorded from Queensland.

The wingspan is 42–45 mm. The forewings are snow white with three blackish discal dots, the first in the disc at one-third, the second in the disc beyond the middle, the third beneath and posterior to the second. There is a series of minute blackish dots on the hindmargin. The hindwings are white, with minute hindmarginal blackish dots which are sometimes obsolete.
