= Cryptophasa spilonota =

Scientific classification
- Kingdom: Animalia
- Phylum: Arthropoda
- Clade: Pancrustacea
- Class: Insecta
- Order: Lepidoptera
- Family: Xyloryctidae
- Genus: Cryptophasa
- Species: C. spilonota

Binomial name
- Cryptophasa spilonota Scott, 1864

Species of moth

Cryptophasa spilonota is a moth in the family Xyloryctidae. It was described by Scott in 1864. It is found in Australia, where it has been recorded from New South Wales and Queensland.

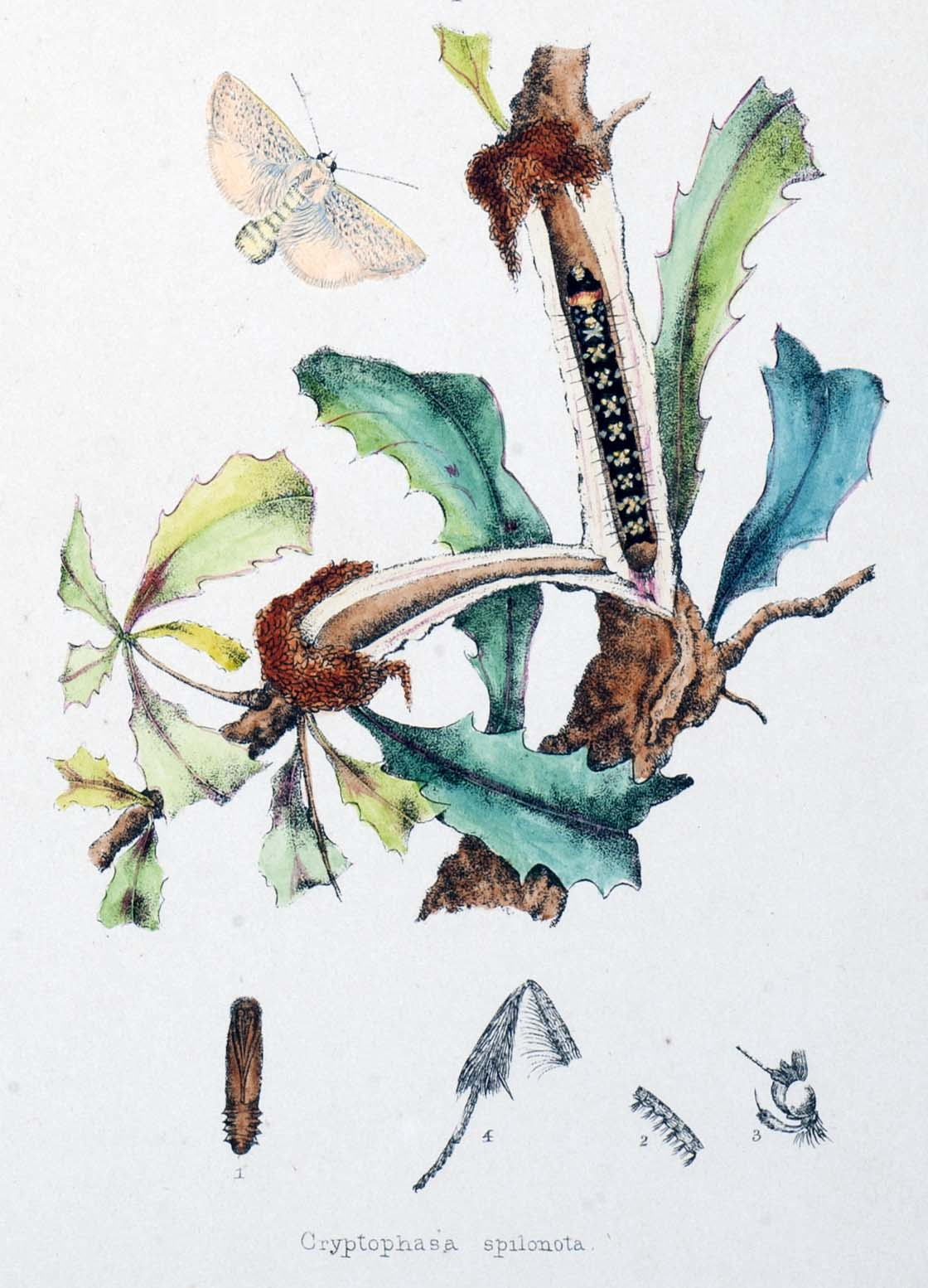
Illustration of the life cycle of Cryptophasa spilonota

The wingspan is about 45 mm. The forewings are pale whitish-grey, slightly fuscous-tinged, irrorated with black and with traces of a small darker spot in the disc at three-fifths. The hindwings are white.

The larvae feed on Banksia serrata and Banksia integrifolia. They bore in the stem of their host plant.
