= Cryptophasa gypsomera =

Scientific classification
- Kingdom: Animalia
- Phylum: Arthropoda
- Clade: Pancrustacea
- Class: Insecta
- Order: Lepidoptera
- Family: Xyloryctidae
- Genus: Cryptophasa
- Species: C. gypsomera

Binomial name
- Cryptophasa gypsomera Lower, 1903

Species of moth

Cryptophasa gypsomera is a moth in the family Xyloryctidae. It was described by Oswald Bertram Lower in 1903. It is found in Australia, where it has been recorded from New South Wales and Victoria.

The wingspan is about 52 mm. The forewings are white, faintly ochreous tinged, especially along the termen. The hindwings are fuscous with the costal edge and termen to the middle broadly snow white.
