= Cryptophasa epixysta =

Scientific classification
- Kingdom: Animalia
- Phylum: Arthropoda
- Clade: Pancrustacea
- Class: Insecta
- Order: Lepidoptera
- Family: Xyloryctidae
- Genus: Cryptophasa
- Species: C. epixysta

Binomial name
- Cryptophasa epixysta Turner, 1917

Species of moth

Cryptophasa epixysta is a moth in the family Xyloryctidae. It was described by Alfred Jefferis Turner in 1917. It is found in Australia, where it has been recorded from the Northern Territory.

The wingspan is 52–56 mm. The forewings are shining white and the hindwings are white.
