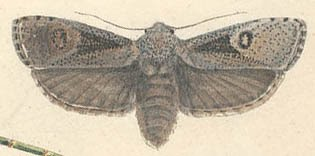
- Female

Scientific classification
- Kingdom: Animalia
- Phylum: Arthropoda
- Clade: Pancrustacea
- Class: Insecta
- Order: Lepidoptera
- Family: Xyloryctidae
- Genus: Cryptophasa
- Species: C. irrorata

Binomial name
- Cryptophasa irrorata Lewin, 1805

= Cryptophasa irrorata =

- Male

Species of moth

Cryptophasa irrorata is a moth in the family Xyloryctidae. It was described by John Lewin in 1805. It is found in Papua New Guinea and Australia, where it has been recorded from the Australian Capital Territory, New South Wales, Queensland and South Australia.

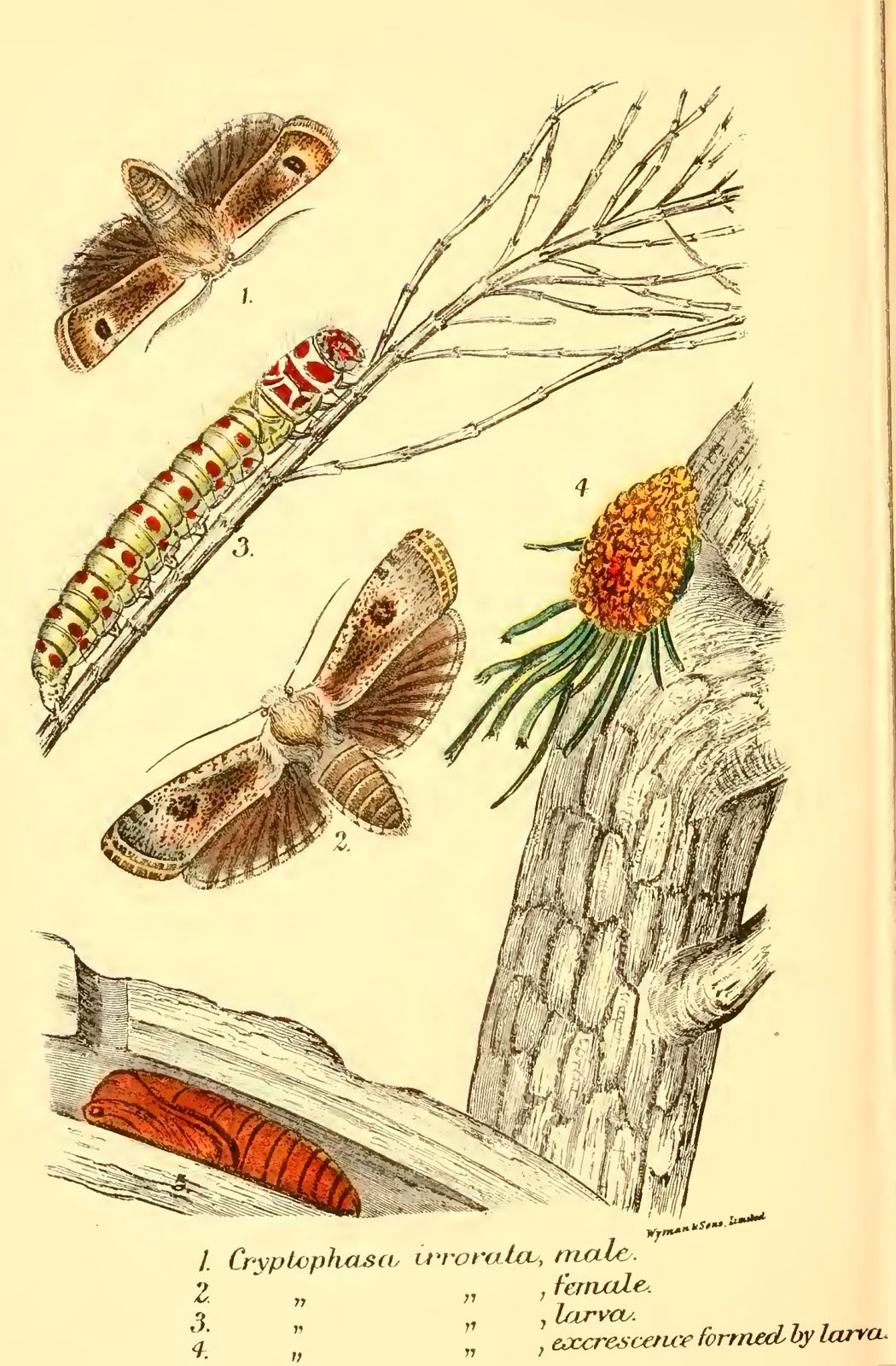
Plate depicting the life cycle of Cryptophasa irrorata

The wingspan is 43–58 mm.

The larvae feed on Casuarina species. They bore in the stem of their host plant.
