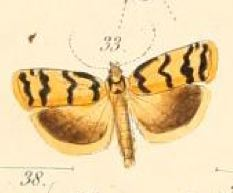

Scientific classification
- Kingdom: Animalia
- Phylum: Arthropoda
- Clade: Pancrustacea
- Class: Insecta
- Order: Lepidoptera
- Family: Xyloryctidae
- Genus: Cryptophasa
- Species: C. insana

Binomial name
- Cryptophasa insana (Felder & Rogenhofer, 1875)

Synonyms
- Tortrix insana Felder & Rogenhofer, 1875

= Cryptophasa insana =

Species of moth

Cryptophasa insana is a moth in the family Xyloryctidae. It was described by Felder & Rogenhofer in 1875. It is found in Australia, where it has been recorded from South Australia and Western Australia.

The ground color of forewings is yellow.
