= Stachyneura sceliphrodes =

Scientific classification
- Kingdom: Animalia
- Phylum: Arthropoda
- Class: Insecta
- Order: Lepidoptera
- Family: Xyloryctidae
- Genus: Stachyneura
- Species: S. sceliphrodes

Binomial name
- Stachyneura sceliphrodes (Meyrick, 1925)

Synonyms
- Cryptophasa sceliphrodes Meyrick, 1925

Species of moth

Stachyneura sceliphrodes is a moth in the family Xyloryctidae. It was described by Edward Meyrick in 1925. It is found in Queensland, Western New Guinea and Papua New Guinea.

The wingspan is 35–40 mm. The forewings are pale greyish ochreous with snow-white reflections, the veins are white sprinkled with dark red brown or sometimes suffused with reddish. There is a snow-white costal streak broad at the base and narrowed to a point at about three-fourths. The cell and dorsal area are more or less suffused with reddish or brown, with thick oblique streaks of blackish or dark red-brown sprinkles from the dorsum at one-third and beyond the middle, and a spot towards the tornus, the spaces between these sometimes suffused with white. There is a terminal series of blackish or dark red-brown triangular dots. The hindwings are light greyish ochreous.
