= Tirathaba monoleuca =

Scientific classification
- Domain: Eukaryota
- Kingdom: Animalia
- Phylum: Arthropoda
- Class: Insecta
- Order: Lepidoptera
- Family: Pyralidae
- Genus: Tirathaba
- Species: T. monoleuca

Binomial name
- Tirathaba monoleuca (Lower, 1894)

Synonyms
- Cryptophaga monoleuca Lower, 1894

Species of moth

Tirathaba monoleuca is a species of moth in the family Pyralidae. It was described by Oswald Bertram Lower in 1894. It is found in Australia.
