= Thomas Pennington Lucas =

Australian medical practitioner and naturalist (1843 - 1917)

Thomas Pennington Lucas (13 April 1843 – 15 November 1917), also known as T.P. Lucas, was a Scottish-born Australian medical practitioner, naturalist, author, philosopher and utopianist.

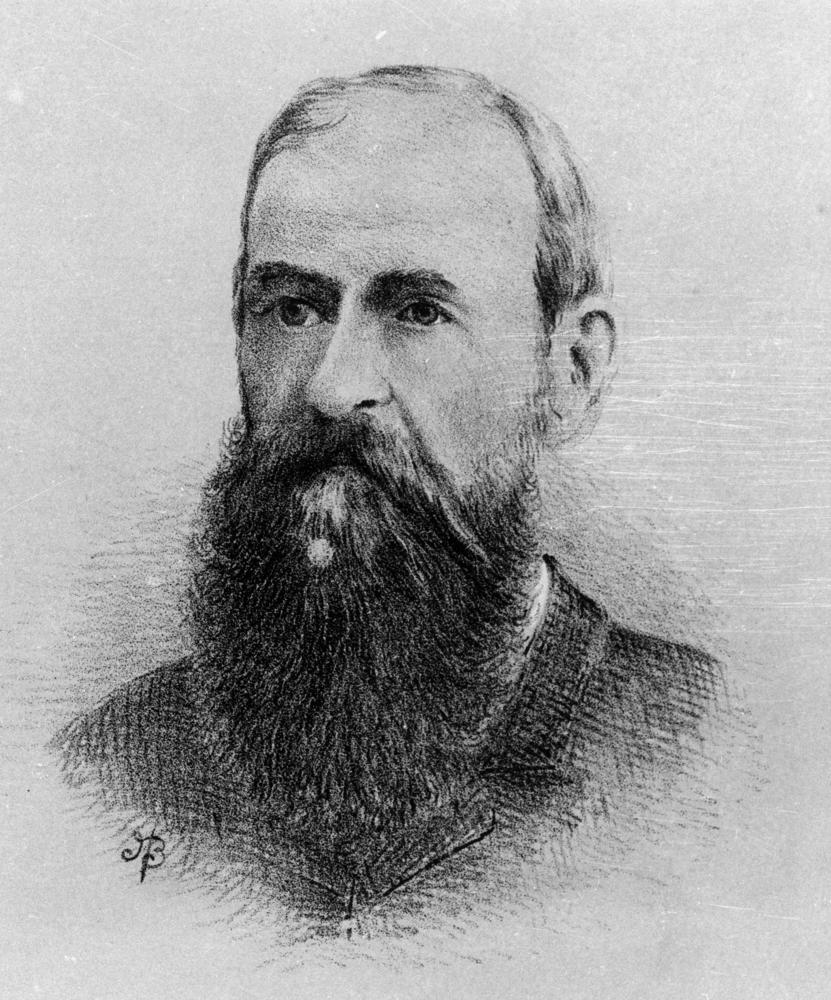
Lithograph of Thomas Pennington Lucas

== Early life ==
Lucas was born in Dunbar, Scotland to Samuel Lucas, a Wesleyan Methodist minister, and Elizabeth Broadhurst. Lucas inherited from his father a love of natural history and a lifelong determination to reconcile his strong religious beliefs with his scientific convictions, as evidenced in many of his books. Because his father was often on the move to new postings, taking his family with him, Thomas was educated at King Edward VI Grammar School at Stratford-on-Avon, Helston Grammar School, Cornwall, and New Kingswood School in Bath.

== Move to Australia ==
Having developed tuberculosis, in 1876 Thomas Lucas migrated to Melbourne, Australia where he set up a medical practice. His three living children joined him there in 1879 after being cared for by his brother, Arthur Henry Shakespeare Lucas. Arthur followed him to Melbourne in 1883 and became a well known biologist and schoolmaster in his own right.

Lucas and his family moved to Brisbane, Queensland in 1886. His medical practice was first set up in central Brisbane, moving in the early 1890s to South Brisbane. Later he relocated to Acacia Ridge south of Brisbane, then finally to New Farm in inner north Brisbane from 1911 until Lucas's death.

A firm believer in the medicinal properties of pawpaws, Thomas Lucas developed and marketed Lucas' Papaw Ointment, which is still produced by Lucas's descendants from a location at Beaudesert Road, Acacia Ridge. In 2009 as part of the Q150 celebrations, the Lucas' Pawpaw Ointment was announced as one of the Q150 Icons of Queensland for its role as an iconic "innovation and invention".

== Scientist ==
From 1884 to 1892 Thomas Lucas edited the Victorian Naturalist, the journal of the Field Naturalists Club of Victoria (founded by his brother in 1882). During his lifetime he collected a large number of butterfly and moth specimens, some of which eventually found their way into the possession of the South Australian Museum.

Lucas was a member of various learned societies including the Linnean Society, the Royal Society, the Royal College of Surgeons, and the British Medical Association in England; and the Linnean Society of New South Wales, the Royal Society of Queensland, and the Natural History Society of Queensland.

== Author ==
Thomas Lucas published a number of books during his lifetime, mostly on non-fiction topics. Some however were works of fiction; they include The Curse and its Cure, comprising two novels bound and published together in 1894, The Ruins of Brisbane in the Year 2000 and Brisbane Rebuilt in the Year 2200. These novels are believed to be the first to be published anywhere that use Brisbane as their setting.

== Personal life ==
Lucas was married three times:

1. to Mary Frances Davies from 1868 until her death in 1875 at age 30. They had six children, of whom three survived: Thomas Pennington (born 1869), Arthur Henry (1871) and Celia Juliana (1874);
2. to Mary Bradbury Ironside from 1878 until her death in 1888. She too bore six children, of whom only one, Eunice Sarah (born 1886), survived beyond infancy;
3. to Susan Draper from 1889 until Thomas's death. They had no children.

After being confined to his room for nearly two weeks, Lucas died in his home in Brisbane aged 73.

== Bibliography ==
- Metcalf, Bill. "Dr Thomas Pennington Lucas: Queensland Scientist, Author, Doctor, Dreamer and Inventor" (PDF). Griffith Research Online. Archived from the original (PDF) on 11 March 2011.
- Lucas, Thomas Pennington (1843 - 1917) Bright Sparcs at Melbourne University
