= List of moths of India (Xyloryctidae) =

This is a list of moths of the family Xyloryctidae that are found in India. It also acts as an index to the species articles and forms part of the full List of moths of India.

- Amorbaea hepatica Meyrick, 1908
- Comocritis circulata (Meyrick, 1918)
- Comocritis cyanobactra Meyrick, 1922
- Comocritis enneora (Meyrick, 1914)
- Comocritis olympia Meyrick, 1894
- Comocritis pieria Meyrick, 1906
- Epichostis antigama (Meyrick, 1908)
- Epichostis cryphaea (Meyrick, 1908)
- Epichostis leucorma (Meyrick, 1908)
- Epichostis stelota (Meyrick, 1908)
- Epichostis tympanias (Meyrick, 1908)
- Eumenodora tetrachorda Meyrick, 1924
- Hermogenes aliferella Zeller, 1867
- Linoclostis gonatias Meyrick, 1908
- Metathrinca ceromorpha (Meyrick, 1923)
- Metathrinca illuvialis (Meyrick, 1914)
- Neospastis calpidias Meyrick, 1917
- Neospastis encryphias (Meyrick, 1907)
- Neospastis ichnaea (Meyrick, 1914)
- Metathrinca parabola (Meyrick, 1914)
- Opisina arenosella Walker, 1864
- Synchalara byrsina (Meyrick, 1907)
- Synchalara rhombota (Meyrick, 1907)
- Synchalara minax (Meyrick, 1907)
- Thymiatris melitacma Meyrick, 1907
- Thymiatris seriosa Diakonoff, 1966
- Trypherantis atelogramma Meyrick, 1907
