= Heliconia (disambiguation) =

Heliconia is a genus of flowering plants.

It may also refer to:

- Heliconia, Antioquia, town in Colombia
- Comocritis heliconia, a moth in the family Xyloryctidae
- Asota heliconia, is a moth in the family Erebidae
- Heliconia Press, Canadian book publisher and television company founded by Ken Whiting

== Similar spelling ==
- Helicon (disambiguation), and Heliconian, various meanings
- Helliconia, science fiction trilogy by Brian Aldiss
- Heliconius, a butterfly genus
