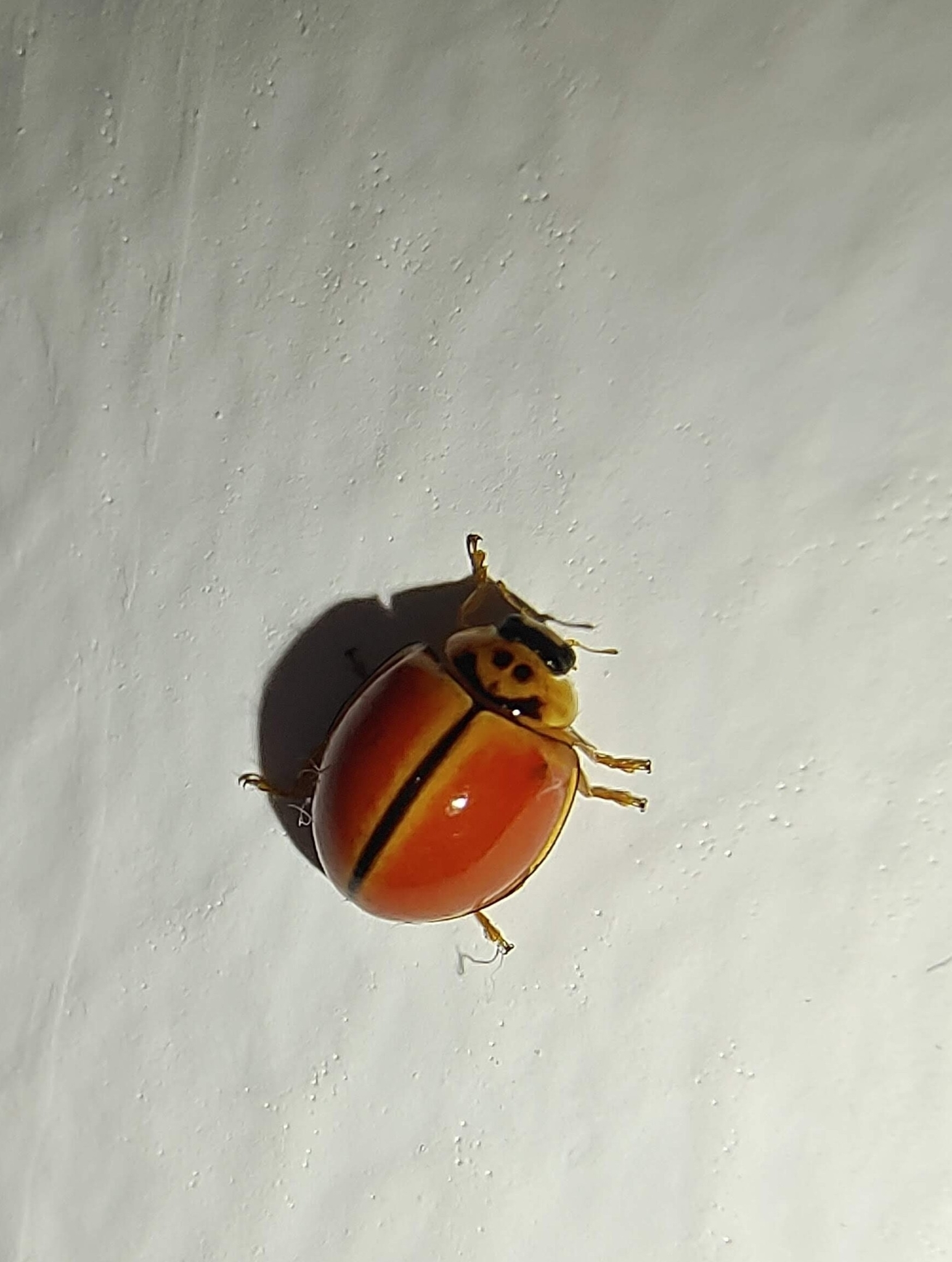

Scientific classification
- Kingdom: Animalia
- Phylum: Arthropoda
- Clade: Pancrustacea
- Class: Insecta
- Order: Coleoptera
- Suborder: Polyphaga
- Infraorder: Cucujiformia
- Family: Coccinellidae
- Subfamily: Coccinellinae
- Tribe: Coccinellini
- Genus: Micraspis
- Species: M. discolor

Binomial name
- Micraspis discolor ( Fabricius, 1798)

Synonyms
- Coccinella discolor Fabricius, 1798; Verania discolor (Fabricius, 1798); Coccinella simplex Thunberg, 1820; Cleis licia Mulsant, 1856; Harmonia crocea Mulsant, 1866; Harmonia tabida Mulsant, 1866; Harmonia nigrilabris Mulsant, 1866

= Micraspis discolor =

Species of beetle

Micraspis discolor is a species of ladybird. It was described by Johan Christian Fabricius in 1798. It is widespread throughout Asia, North America and parts of Oceania.

== Distribution ==
It is found in Bangladesh, China, India, Malaysia, Sri Lanka, Taiwan, Vietnam, United States, Hawaii and Tonga.

== Description ==
Body length is 5 to 6 mm. Adult has a reddish orange body which is oval in shape. There are black stripes on elytra.

== Biology ==
It is one of the most common lady beetle found in rice ecosystems particularly during flowering and feeds on pollen. The species can be used as a bio-control agent for brown planthopper. It is found as both entomophagous and phytophagous species of beetle.

Both adult beetles and nymphs are voracious predators on several pests such as, Aphis craccivora, Aphis gossypii, Aphis spiraecola, Leptocorisa acuta, Myzus persicae, Nephotettix cincticeps, Opisina arenosella, Pentalonia nigronervosa and Sogatella furcifera.
