= Linoclostis musicodes =

Scientific classification
- Kingdom: Animalia
- Phylum: Arthropoda
- Class: Insecta
- Order: Lepidoptera
- Family: Xyloryctidae
- Genus: Linoclostis
- Species: L. musicodes

Binomial name
- Linoclostis musicodes Meyrick, 1910

Species of moth

Linoclostis musicodes is a moth in the family Xyloryctidae. It was described by Edward Meyrick in 1910. It is found on Borneo.

The wingspan is 11–13 mm. The forewings are white with a fuscous line from two-thirds of the costa to the tornus, right angled in the middle, dark fuscous towards the extremities. The space between this and the termen is more or less tinged with fuscous and there is a dark fuscous line around the posterior sixth of the costa and termen to near the tornus. The hindwings are whitish grey.
