= Epichostis elephantias =

Scientific classification
- Kingdom: Animalia
- Phylum: Arthropoda
- Class: Insecta
- Order: Lepidoptera
- Family: Xyloryctidae
- Genus: Epichostis
- Species: E. elephantias

Binomial name
- Epichostis elephantias Meyrick, 1906

Species of moth

Epichostis elephantias is a moth in the family Xyloryctidae. It was described by Edward Meyrick in 1906. It is found in Sri Lanka.

The wingspan is 15–16 mm (0.59–0.63 in). The forewings are pale silvery fuscous with a moderately broad whitish-ochreous costal streak from the base to near the apex, pointed posteriorly, suffused with ochreous yellow towards the costa. There are two dark fuscous irregular rounded-oblong dorsal blotches edged with whitish ochreous, reaching the costal streak (the outline of these blotches somewhat suggestive of that of an elephant), the first extending on the dorsum from near the base to two-fifths, the second from the middle to near the tornus. There is a dark fuscous terminal line interrupted by whitish-ochreous dots on the veins. The hindwings are rather dark grey.
