= Epichostis termitruncatula =

Scientific classification
- Domain: Eukaryota
- Kingdom: Animalia
- Phylum: Arthropoda
- Class: Insecta
- Order: Lepidoptera
- Family: Xyloryctidae
- Genus: Epichostis
- Species: E. termitruncatula

Binomial name
- Epichostis termitruncatula Yuan & Wang, 2009

Species of moth

Epichostis termitruncatula is a moth in the family Xyloryctidae. It was described by Yuan and Wang in 2009. It lives in China.
