= Neospastis =

Scientific classification
- Domain: Eukaryota
- Kingdom: Animalia
- Phylum: Arthropoda
- Class: Insecta
- Order: Lepidoptera
- Family: Xyloryctidae
- Genus: Neospastis; Meyrick, 1917

Moth genus in family Xyloryctidae

Neospastis is a genus of moths of the family Xyloryctidae.

== Species ==
- Neospastis calpidias Meyrick, 1917
- Neospastis encryphias (Meyrick, 1907)
- Neospastis ichnaea (Meyrick, 1914)
- Neospastis sinensis Bradley, 1961
