= Amorbaea =

Scientific classification
- Kingdom: Animalia
- Phylum: Arthropoda
- Class: Insecta
- Order: Lepidoptera
- Family: Xyloryctidae
- Genus: Amorbaea; Meyrick, 1908

Moth genus in family Xyloryctidae

Amorbaea is a genus of moths of the family Xyloryctidae.

== Species ==
- Amorbaea hepatica Meyrick, 1908
- Amorbaea subtusvena Diakonoff, [1968]
- Amorbaea subusta Diakonoff, [1968]
