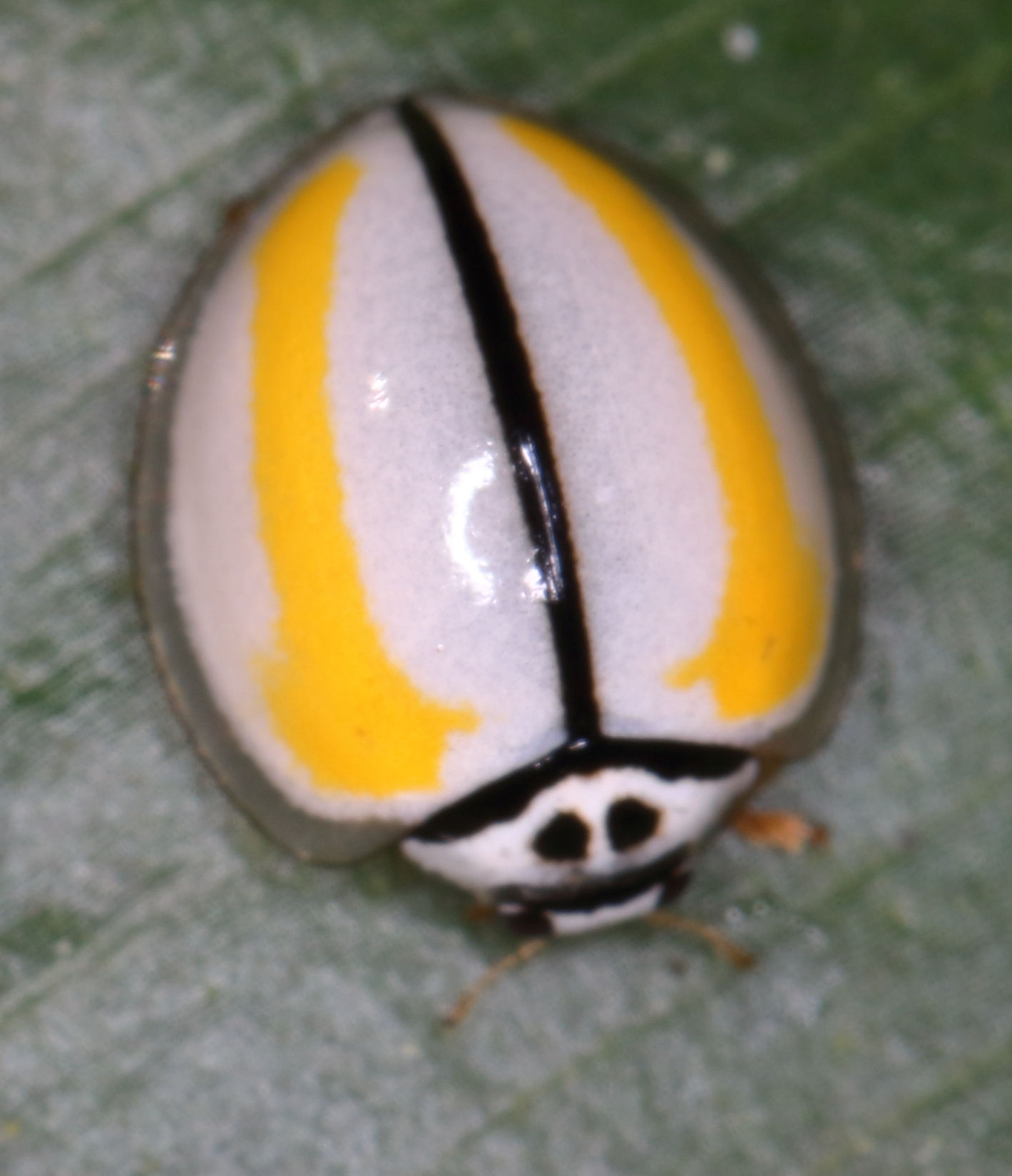

Scientific classification
- Kingdom: Animalia
- Phylum: Arthropoda
- Clade: Pancrustacea
- Class: Insecta
- Order: Coleoptera
- Suborder: Polyphaga
- Infraorder: Cucujiformia
- Family: Coccinellidae
- Genus: Micraspis
- Species: M. divergens

Binomial name
- Micraspis divergens (Thunberg, 1820)

Synonyms
- Coccinella divergens Thunberg, 1820; Cheilomenes weisei Gorham, 1901; Hyperaspis capeneri Mader, 1955

= Micraspis divergens =

Species of beetle

Micraspis divergens is a species of beetle in the family Coccinellidae.
