= Synchalara =

Scientific classification
- Domain: Eukaryota
- Kingdom: Animalia
- Phylum: Arthropoda
- Class: Insecta
- Order: Lepidoptera
- Family: Xyloryctidae
- Genus: Synchalara; Meyrick, 1917

Moth genus in family Xyloryctidae

Synchalara is a genus of moths of the family Xyloryctidae.

== Species ==
- Synchalara argoplaca (Meyrick, 1907)
- Synchalara byrsina (Meyrick, 1907)
- Synchalara malacobryas (Meyrick, 1938)
- Synchalara minax (Meyrick, 1907)
- Synchalara rhizograpta Meyrick, 1934
- Synchalara rhombota (Meyrick, 1907)
