= Comocritis nephelista =

Scientific classification
- Domain: Eukaryota
- Kingdom: Animalia
- Phylum: Arthropoda
- Class: Insecta
- Order: Lepidoptera
- Family: Xyloryctidae
- Genus: Comocritis
- Species: C. nephelista

Binomial name
- Comocritis nephelista (Meyrick, 1914)

Synonyms
- Aetherastis nephelista Meyrick, 1914

Species of moth

Comocritis nephelista is a moth in the family Xyloryctidae. It was described by Edward Meyrick in 1914. It is found in Sri Lanka.

The wingspan is 16–20 mm (0.63–0.79 in). The forewings are white brownish irrorated (sprinkled) with dark fuscous, more strongly posteriorly. There is a suffused white streak along the costa from about one-third to near the apex and two small indistinct dark fuscous spots obliquely placed towards the costa at one-fourth. A suffused whitish streak encloses an elongate semi-oval patch of stronger dark irroration along the median third of the dorsum and there is some indistinct whitish admixture in the disc posteriorly, sometimes forming a suffused streak running to the termen above the tornus. There are also four small indistinct cloudy dark fuscous spots around the apex and termen. The hindwings are light grey.
