= Comocritis praecolor =

Scientific classification
- Domain: Eukaryota
- Kingdom: Animalia
- Phylum: Arthropoda
- Class: Insecta
- Order: Lepidoptera
- Family: Xyloryctidae
- Genus: Comocritis
- Species: C. praecolor

Binomial name
- Comocritis praecolor (Meyrick, 1914)

Synonyms
- Aetherastis praecolor Meyrick, 1914

Species of moth

Comocritis praecolor is a moth in the family Xyloryctidae. It was described by Edward Meyrick in 1914. It is found in Sri Lanka.

The wingspan is about 15 mm (0.59 in). The forewings are white with three suffused blotches of fuscous irroration, sprinkled with black specks, occupying most of the disc from near the base to near the apex, separated only by curved white streaks, the first blotch extending below the fold and indistinctly to the costa, the second extended anteriorly to the costa at two-fifths and limited beneath by the fold, the third resting on the tornus and not reaching the costa. There is some slight dark fuscous irroration towards the middle of the dorsum and a narrow yellow-ochreous apical fascia attenuated downwards to the middle of the termen, the edged anteriorly with some dark fuscous irroration. The hindwings are grey.
