= Epichostis dicremna =

Scientific classification
- Kingdom: Animalia
- Phylum: Arthropoda
- Class: Insecta
- Order: Lepidoptera
- Family: Xyloryctidae
- Genus: Epichostis
- Species: E. dicremna

Binomial name
- Epichostis dicremna (Meyrick, 1908)

Synonyms
- Hermogenes dicremna Meyrick, 1908

Species of moth

Epichostis dicremna is a moth in the family Xyloryctidae. It was described by Edward Meyrick in 1908. It is found in Sri Lanka.

The wingspan is 16–19 mm. The forewings are violet brownish, variable in depth, sometimes mixed with pale ochreous yellowish towards the costa. The costal edge is ochreous yellowish and there is sometimes a brown basal patch more or less indicated, obsolete towards the costa. A dark ferruginous-brown variable transverse blotch is found on the middle of the dorsum, sometimes narrowed upwards, reaching about three-fourths across the wing, the anterior edge nearly vertical and edged first with dark fuscous and then with whitish. The second discal stigma is dark fuscous, partially whitish edged and there is a narrow transverse dark ferruginous-brown subterminal fascia, sinuate inwards and strongest on the upper half, attenuated dorsally, more or less yellowish edged anteriorly. There is also an interrupted blackish terminal line. The hindwings are whitish grey in males and grey in females.
