= Synchalara argoplaca =

Scientific classification
- Domain: Eukaryota
- Kingdom: Animalia
- Phylum: Arthropoda
- Class: Insecta
- Order: Lepidoptera
- Family: Xyloryctidae
- Genus: Synchalara
- Species: S. argoplaca

Binomial name
- Synchalara argoplaca (Meyrick, 1907)

Synonyms
- Agriophara argoplaca Meyrick, 1907

Species of moth

Synchalara argoplaca is a moth in the family Xyloryctidae. It was described by Edward Meyrick in 1907. It is found in Sri Lanka.

The wingspan is 25–28 mm. The forewings are dark bronzy-brown, becoming whitish-fuscous towards the dorsum and termen. There is a broad white patch extending along the costa from near the base to three-fourths, and reaching nearly half across the wing, the posterior edge inwardly oblique and somewhat concave. There is also an interrupted dark fuscous terminal line. The hindwings are whitish-fuscous.
