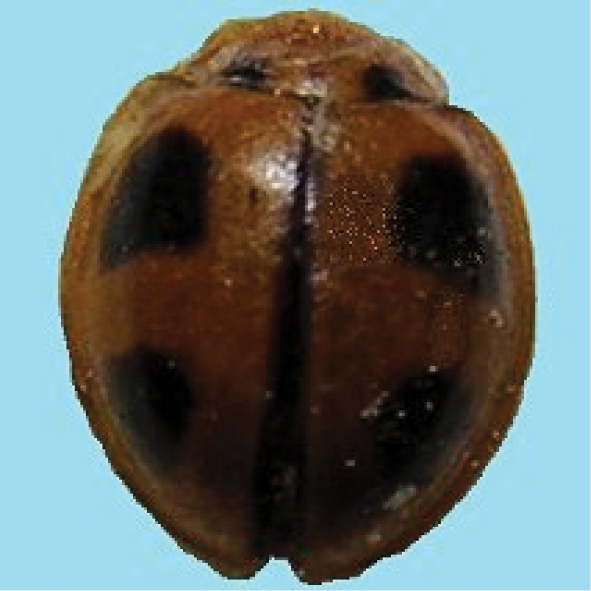

Scientific classification
- Kingdom: Animalia
- Phylum: Arthropoda
- Clade: Pancrustacea
- Class: Insecta
- Order: Coleoptera
- Suborder: Polyphaga
- Infraorder: Cucujiformia
- Family: Coccinellidae
- Genus: Micraspis
- Species: M. allardi

Binomial name
- Micraspis allardi (Mulsant, 1866)

Synonyms
- Lemnia allardi Mulsant, 1866; Lemnia malaccensis Crotch, 1874

= Micraspis allardi =

Species of beetle

Micraspis allardi is a species of beetle of the family Coccinellidae. It is found in India, Pakistan, Myanmar, Indonesia, the Philippines and Papua New Guinea.

== Description ==
Adults reach a length of about 3.4–4 mm (0.13–0.16 in). The head and antennae are yellow, while the pronotum, scutellum and elytra are yellow or orange, the former with two, and the elytra with four black patches. The lateral border of the elytra is yellow and the suture is black.
