= Epichostis microdelta =

Scientific classification
- Domain: Eukaryota
- Kingdom: Animalia
- Phylum: Arthropoda
- Class: Insecta
- Order: Lepidoptera
- Family: Xyloryctidae
- Genus: Epichostis
- Species: E. microdelta

Binomial name
- Epichostis microdelta Meyrick, 1928

Species of insect

Epichostis microdelta is a moth in the family Xyloryctidae. It was described by Edward Meyrick in 1928. It is found in China.
