= Thymiatris =

Scientific classification
- Domain: Eukaryota
- Kingdom: Animalia
- Phylum: Arthropoda
- Class: Insecta
- Order: Lepidoptera
- Family: Xyloryctidae
- Genus: Thymiatris; Meyrick, 1907

Moth genus in family Xyloryctidae

Thymiatris is a genus of moths of the family Xyloryctidae.

== Species ==
- Thymiatris allocrossa (Turner, 1902)
- Thymiatris arista Diakonoff, [1968]
- Thymiatris cephalochra (Lower, 1894)
- Thymiatris melitacma Meyrick, 1907
- Thymiatris microloga Diakonoff, 1966
- Thymiatris scolia Diakonoff, 1966
- Thymiatris seriosa Diakonoff, 1966
