= Metathrinca rosaria =

Scientific classification
- Kingdom: Animalia
- Phylum: Arthropoda
- Class: Insecta
- Order: Lepidoptera
- Family: Xyloryctidae
- Genus: Metathrinca
- Species: M. rosaria

Binomial name
- Metathrinca rosaria (Meyrick, 1907)

Synonyms
- Ptochoryctis rosaria Meyrick, 1907

Species of moth

Metathrinca rosaria is a moth in the family Xyloryctidae. It was described by Edward Meyrick in 1907. It is found in Bhutan.

The wingspan is 23–24 mm. The forewings are shining snow white with a submarginal series of seven black dots around the apex and termen. The hindwings are white.
