= Metathrinca pernivis =

Scientific classification
- Domain: Eukaryota
- Kingdom: Animalia
- Phylum: Arthropoda
- Class: Insecta
- Order: Lepidoptera
- Family: Xyloryctidae
- Genus: Metathrinca
- Species: M. pernivis

Binomial name
- Metathrinca pernivis Diakonoff, [1968]

Species of moth

Metathrinca pernivis is a moth in the family Xyloryctidae. It was described by Alexey Diakonoff in 1968. It is found on Mindanao in the Philippines.

The wingspan is about 12 mm. The forewings and hindwings are glossy snow white.
