= Epichostis melanocona =

Scientific classification
- Kingdom: Animalia
- Phylum: Arthropoda
- Clade: Pancrustacea
- Class: Insecta
- Order: Lepidoptera
- Family: Xyloryctidae
- Genus: Epichostis
- Species: E. melanocona

Binomial name
- Epichostis melanocona (Meyrick, 1908)

Synonyms
- Hermogenes melanocona Meyrick, 1908

Species of moth

Epichostis melanocona is a moth in the family Xyloryctidae. It was described by Edward Meyrick in 1908. It is found in Sri Lanka.

The wingspan is 13–17 mm (0.51–0.67 in). The forewings are light violet fuscous, the costa suffused with pale ochreous except towards the apex. There is a variable transverse or subtriangular blackish blotch on the dorsum before the middle, edged with whitish yellow, reaching nearly three-fourths of the way across the wing. The second discal stigma is black and moderate, edged with whitish-ochreous. There is a transverse streak of blackish suffusion from five-sixths of the costa to before the tornus, becoming obsolete dorsally, curved inwards on the upper half. There is an interrupted blackish terminal line. The hindwings are pale grey.
