= Metathrinca coenophyes =

Scientific classification
- Domain: Eukaryota
- Kingdom: Animalia
- Phylum: Arthropoda
- Class: Insecta
- Order: Lepidoptera
- Family: Xyloryctidae
- Genus: Metathrinca
- Species: M. coenophyes

Binomial name
- Metathrinca coenophyes Diakonoff, [1968]

Species of moth

Metathrinca coenophyes is a moth in the family Xyloryctidae. It was described by Alexey Diakonoff in 1968. It is found on Luzon in the Philippines.

The wingspan is about 15 mm for males and 18 mm for females. The forewings of the males are glossy silvery white, with the costal and terminal edge from the end of vein 11 as far as the end of the fold with a fine black line, becoming very thin and brownish along the termen. There is a faint trace of a fuscous line, strongly angulate in the middle, from beyond three-fourths of the costa to the tornus. The hindwings are silky pure white. Females are all white, with a transverse line of blackish irroration from the costa beyond three-fourths to the tornus, strongly angulate in the middle, straight above and below the angulation. The base of the costal edge and extreme edge in the apex are finely black. The female hindwings are white, with the apex and upper half of the termen slightly irrorated with dark grey, this color extending along the posterior part of the costa and along the bases of the veins, one-third toward the cell.
