= Neospastis sinensis =

Scientific classification
- Kingdom: Animalia
- Phylum: Arthropoda
- Class: Insecta
- Order: Lepidoptera
- Family: Xyloryctidae
- Genus: Neospastis
- Species: N. sinensis

Binomial name
- Neospastis sinensis Bradley, 1961

Species of moth

Neospastis sinensis is a moth in the family Xyloryctidae. It was described by John David Bradley in 1961 and is found in China (Hongkong).

The larvae feed on Camellia sinensis.
