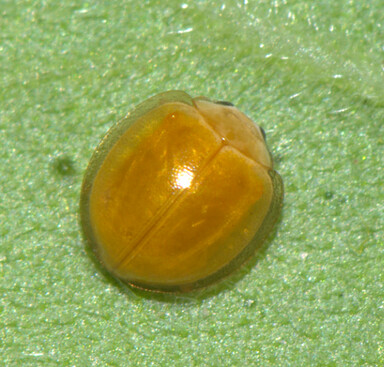

Scientific classification
- Kingdom: Animalia
- Phylum: Arthropoda
- Clade: Pancrustacea
- Class: Insecta
- Order: Coleoptera
- Suborder: Polyphaga
- Infraorder: Cucujiformia
- Family: Coccinellidae
- Genus: Micraspis
- Species: M. pusilla

Binomial name
- Micraspis pusilla Poorani, 2014

Synonyms
- Micraspis pusillus

= Micraspis pusilla =

Species of beetle

Micraspis pusilla is a species of beetle of the family Coccinellidae. It is found in India (Assam, Meghalaya, Sikkim).

== Description ==
Adults reach a length of about 3–3.3 mm (0.12–0.13 in). The head is creamy white and the antennae are pale yellow. The pronotum and elytra are yellow with transparent lateral borders.
