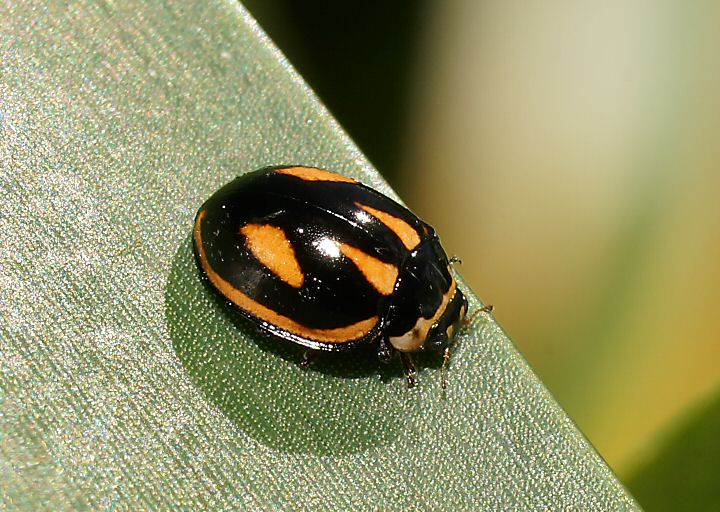

Scientific classification
- Kingdom: Animalia
- Phylum: Arthropoda
- Clade: Pancrustacea
- Class: Insecta
- Order: Coleoptera
- Suborder: Polyphaga
- Infraorder: Cucujiformia
- Family: Coccinellidae
- Subfamily: Coccinellinae
- Tribe: Coccinellini
- Genus: Micraspis
- Species: M. flavovittata

Binomial name
- Micraspis flavovittata (Crotch, 1874)

Synonyms
- Verania flavovittata Crotch, 1874

= Micraspis flavovittata =

Species of beetle

Micraspis flavovittata is a species of ladybird of the genus Micraspis. The species was described by Crotch in 1874. The species was presumed to become extinct until an amateur naturalist found about 40 individuals of the species in the Discovery Bay Coastal Park in western Victoria.

== Description ==
Adults reach a length of about 4.5–5 mm (0.18–0.20 in). The front of the head is yellow and the pronotum is yellow anteriorly, while the remaining part is black. The scutellum is black and the elytra are yellow, with black lateral borders and suture.
