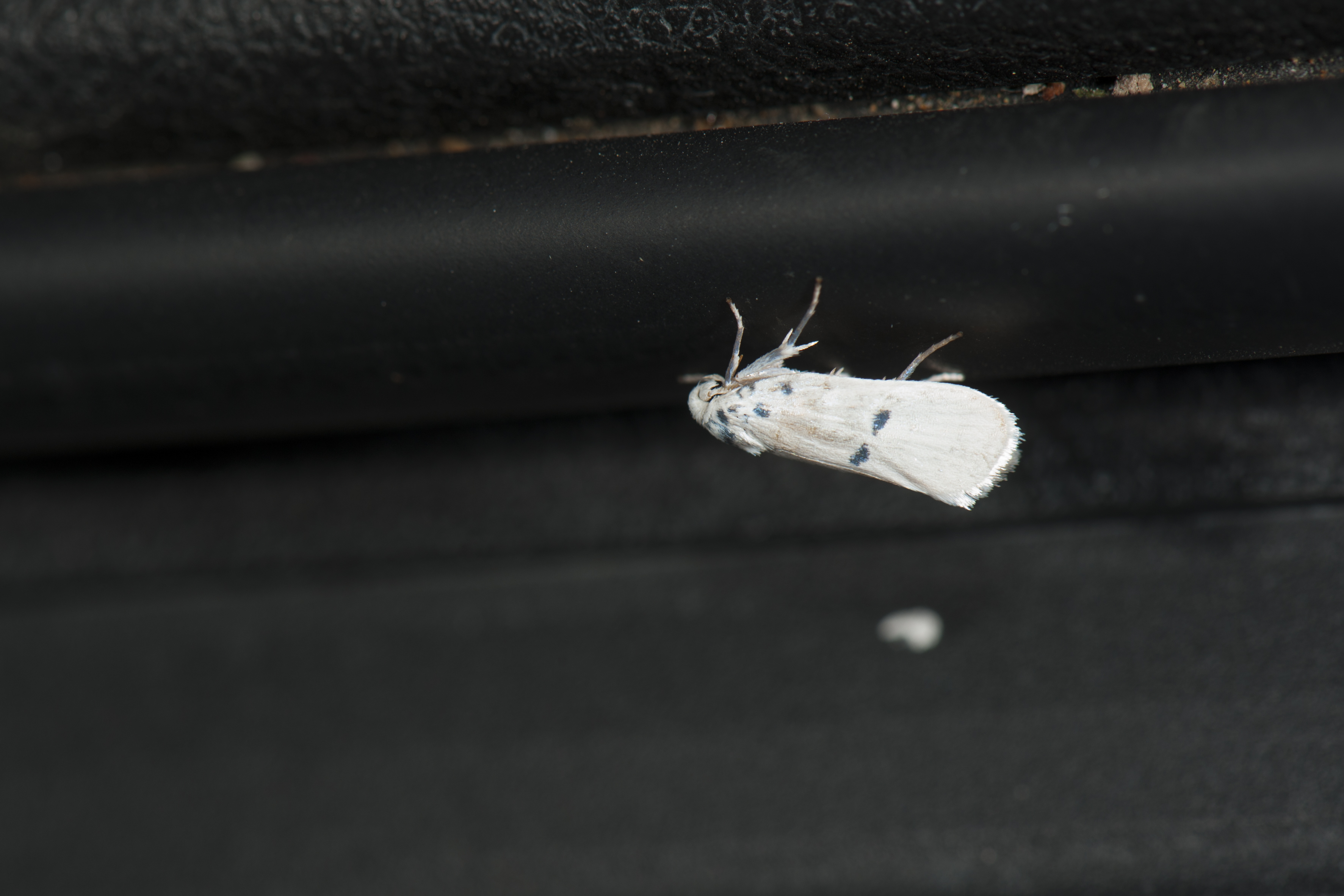

Scientific classification
- Kingdom: Animalia
- Phylum: Arthropoda
- Clade: Pancrustacea
- Class: Insecta
- Order: Lepidoptera
- Family: Xyloryctidae
- Genus: Comocritis
- Species: C. albicapilla

Binomial name
- Comocritis albicapilla Moriuti, 1974

= Comocritis albicapilla =

Species of moth

Comocritis albicapilla is a moth in the family Xyloryctidae. It was described by Sigeru Moriuti in 1974. It is found in Taiwan and in Guangdong, China. It is a pest of lychee.

The wingspan is 22–24 mm (0.87–0.94 in). Adults are on wing in late May and early June in one generation per year.
