= Epichostis leptorthra =

Scientific classification
- Kingdom: Animalia
- Phylum: Arthropoda
- Class: Insecta
- Order: Lepidoptera
- Family: Xyloryctidae
- Genus: Epichostis
- Species: E. leptorthra

Binomial name
- Epichostis leptorthra Meyrick, 1931

Species of moth

Epichostis leptorthra is a moth in the family Xyloryctidae. It was described by Edward Meyrick in 1931. It is found in China.
