= Metathrinca iridostoma =

Scientific classification
- Kingdom: Animalia
- Phylum: Arthropoda
- Clade: Pancrustacea
- Class: Insecta
- Order: Lepidoptera
- Family: Xyloryctidae
- Genus: Metathrinca
- Species: M. iridostoma

Binomial name
- Metathrinca iridostoma Diakonoff, [1968]

Species of moth

Metathrinca iridostoma is a moth in the family Xyloryctidae. It was described by Alexey Diakonoff in 1968. It is found on Luzon in the Philippines.

The wingspan is 17–18 mm for males and 16–17 mm for females. The forewings are snow white, with a silky gloss and with the basal fourth of the costa with a narrow marginal fuscous line. The hindwings are glossy silvery white.
