= Thymiatris allocrossa =

Scientific classification
- Domain: Eukaryota
- Kingdom: Animalia
- Phylum: Arthropoda
- Class: Insecta
- Order: Lepidoptera
- Family: Xyloryctidae
- Genus: Thymiatris
- Species: T. allocrossa

Binomial name
- Thymiatris allocrossa (Turner, 1902)

Synonyms
- Lichenaula allocrossa Turner, 1902

Species of moth

Thymiatris allocrossa is a moth in the family Xyloryctidae. It was described by Alfred Jefferis Turner in 1902. It is found in Australia, where it has been recorded from Queensland.

The larvae feed on the foliage of Elattostachys xylocarpa.
