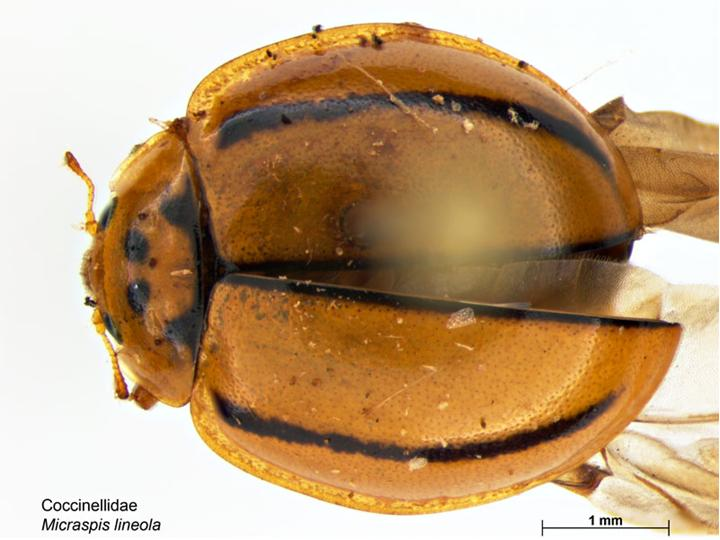

Scientific classification
- Kingdom: Animalia
- Phylum: Arthropoda
- Clade: Pancrustacea
- Class: Insecta
- Order: Coleoptera
- Suborder: Polyphaga
- Infraorder: Cucujiformia
- Family: Coccinellidae
- Subfamily: Coccinellinae
- Tribe: Coccinellini
- Genus: Micraspis
- Species: M. lineola

Binomial name
- Micraspis lineola (Fabricius, 1775)

Synonyms
- Coccinella lineola Fabricius, 1775; Coccinella striola Fabricius in Illiger, 1803; Coccinella strigula Boisduval, 1835

= Micraspis lineola =

Species of beetle

Micraspis lineola is a species of ladybird. It was described by Johan Christian Fabricius in 1775. It is found in northern Australia, Indonesia (Western New Guinea), Papua New Guinea, Fiji and Tonga.

== Description ==
Adults reach a length of about 3.7–4.5 mm (0.15–0.18 in). The head is pale, with a dark anteriomedian patch in females. The pronotum is yellow, with a transverse black stripe. The borders and suture of the elytra are black. The scutellum is also black.
