= Metathrinca intacta =

Scientific classification
- Kingdom: Animalia
- Phylum: Arthropoda
- Class: Insecta
- Order: Lepidoptera
- Family: Xyloryctidae
- Genus: Metathrinca
- Species: M. intacta

Binomial name
- Metathrinca intacta (Meyrick, 1938)

Synonyms
- Ptochoryctis intacta Meyrick, 1938

Species of moth

Metathrinca intacta is a moth in the family Xyloryctidae. It was described by Edward Meyrick in 1938. It is found in Yunnan, China.
