= Thymiatris scolia =

Scientific classification
- Domain: Eukaryota
- Kingdom: Animalia
- Phylum: Arthropoda
- Class: Insecta
- Order: Lepidoptera
- Family: Xyloryctidae
- Genus: Thymiatris
- Species: T. scolia

Binomial name
- Thymiatris scolia Diakonoff, 1966

Species of moth

Thymiatris scolia is a moth in the family Xyloryctidae. It was described by Alexey Diakonoff in 1966. It is found on Java.
