= Metathrinca ancistrias =

Scientific classification
- Kingdom: Animalia
- Phylum: Arthropoda
- Class: Insecta
- Order: Lepidoptera
- Family: Xyloryctidae
- Genus: Metathrinca
- Species: M. ancistrias

Binomial name
- Metathrinca ancistrias (Meyrick, 1906)

Synonyms
- Ptochoryctis ancistrias Meyrick, 1906

Species of moth

Metathrinca ancistrias is a moth in the family Xyloryctidae. It was described by Edward Meyrick in 1906. It is found in Sri Lanka.

The wingspan is 13–23 mm (0.51–0.91 in). The forewings are shining white, towards the dorsum and termen faintly ochreous tinged. There is a dark fuscous line posteriorly more or less suffused with brownish, running from three-fourths of the costa to the dorsum before the tornus, strongly rounded angulated in the middle so as to approach the termen, more or less obsolete or interrupted on the angle, subsinuate inwards on the lower half and becoming stronger and darker towards the dorsum. Sometimes, there is a faint brownish longitudinal mark in the disc preceding this line and there is a more or less marked dark fuscous marginal line around the apex. The hindwings are ochreous-whitish or pale whitish ochreous grey.
