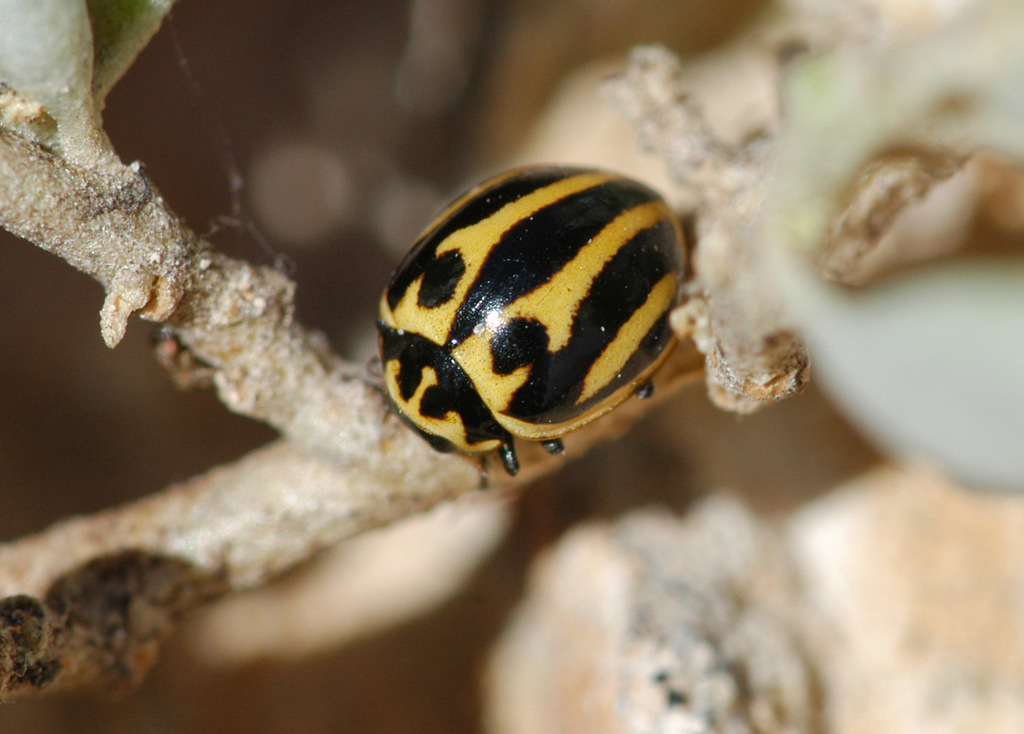

Scientific classification
- Kingdom: Animalia
- Phylum: Arthropoda
- Clade: Pancrustacea
- Class: Insecta
- Order: Coleoptera
- Suborder: Polyphaga
- Infraorder: Cucujiformia
- Family: Coccinellidae
- Genus: Micraspis
- Species: M. furcifera

Binomial name
- Micraspis furcifera (Guérin-Méneville, 1831)

Synonyms
- Coccinella furcifera Guérin-Méneville, 1831; Sospita flavolineata Mulsant, 1866; Verania gauthardi Mulsant, 1866

= Micraspis furcifera =

Species of beetle

Micraspis furcifera is a species of beetle of the family Coccinellidae. It is found in Australia (New South Wales, South Australia, Western Australia).

== Description ==
Adults reach a length of about 4.4–5.6 mm (0.17–0.22 in). The head is yellow with a dark marking at the base. The pronotum is yellow with a black transverse band and two admedian spots. The scutellum is black or yellow with black borders. The elytra are yellow with transparent external margins and black suture.
