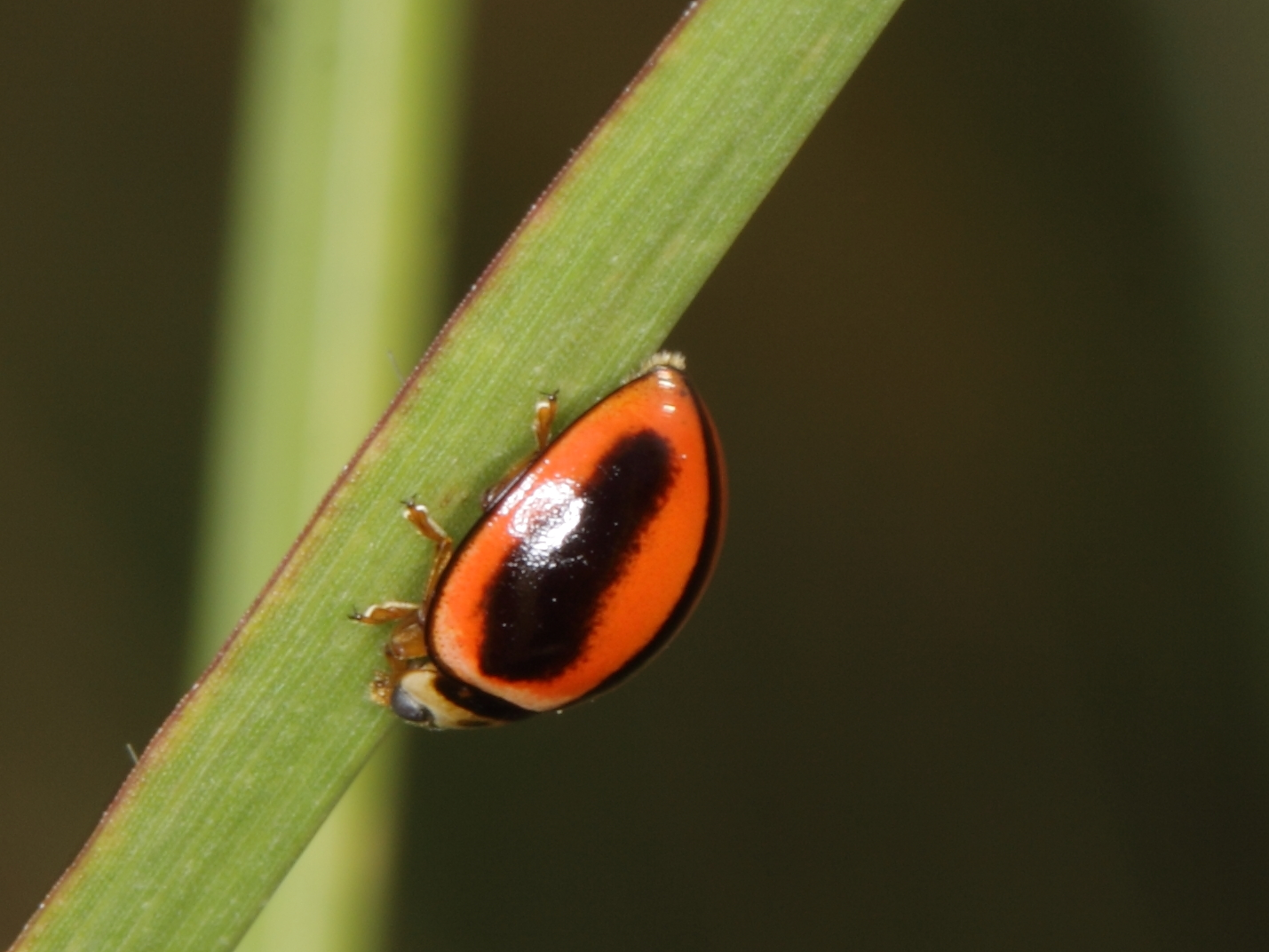

Scientific classification
- Kingdom: Animalia
- Phylum: Arthropoda
- Clade: Pancrustacea
- Class: Insecta
- Order: Coleoptera
- Suborder: Polyphaga
- Infraorder: Cucujiformia
- Family: Coccinellidae
- Subfamily: Coccinellinae
- Tribe: Coccinellini
- Genus: Micraspis
- Species: M. lineata

Binomial name
- Micraspis lineata (Thunberg, 1781)

Synonyms
- Coccinella lineata Thunberg, 1781; Coccinella striata Fabricius, 1792; Coccinella limbata Fabricius, 1801; Coccinella lineata Fabricius in Illiger, 1803

= Micraspis lineata =

Species of beetle

Micraspis lineata is a species of beetle of the family Coccinellidae. It is found in Indonesia (Western New Guinea) and Papua New Guinea.

== Description ==
Adults reach a length of about 3.8–5.3 mm (0.15–0.21 in). The head and antennae are yellow. The frons is pale in males, in females with a black patch. The basal half of the pronotum is black, and has a black trapezoidal marking. The scutellum is black and the elytra have a black sutural area, and a broad anteriorly and posteriorly incomplete discal stripe. The external margin is black.
