= Epichostis metrodelta =

Scientific classification
- Kingdom: Animalia
- Phylum: Arthropoda
- Class: Insecta
- Order: Lepidoptera
- Family: Xyloryctidae
- Genus: Epichostis
- Species: E. metrodelta

Binomial name
- Epichostis metrodelta (Meyrick, 1905)

Synonyms
- Chaliniastis metrodelta Meyrick, 1905

Species of moth

Epichostis metrodelta is a moth in the family Xyloryctidae. It was described by Edward Meyrick in 1905. It is found in Sri Lanka.

The wingspan is about 15 mm. The forewings are fuscous, slightly purplish tinged with the costal edge ochreous orange, somewhat suffused into the ground colour. There are straight parallel transverse whitish-ochreous lines at two-fifths and beyond four-fifths, the first followed by a triangular dorsal ochreous-brown patch, reaching three-fourths of the way across the wing, edged with dark fuscous posteriorly, the second rather broadly edged with dark fuscous posteriorly. The second discal stigma is dark fuscous, edged with whitish ochreous and there is a dark fuscous line around the termen and apex, interrupted by ochreous-yellow dots. The hindwings are fuscous, slightly brassy tinged.
