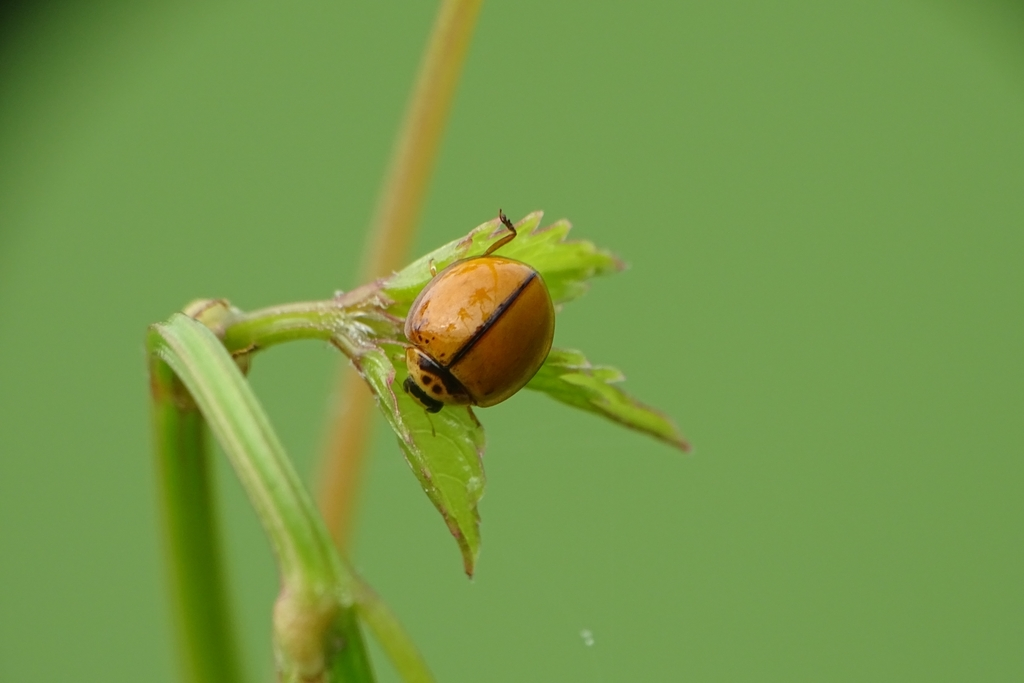

Scientific classification
- Kingdom: Animalia
- Phylum: Arthropoda
- Clade: Pancrustacea
- Class: Insecta
- Order: Coleoptera
- Suborder: Polyphaga
- Infraorder: Cucujiformia
- Family: Coccinellidae
- Genus: Micraspis
- Species: M. tenuilinea

Binomial name
- Micraspis tenuilinea (Walker, 1859)

Synonyms
- Coccinella tenuilinea Walker, 1859

= Micraspis tenuilinea =

Species of beetle

Micraspis tenuilinea is a species of beetle of the family Coccinellidae. It is found in India (Andhra Pradesh, Karnataka, Kerala, Pondicherry, Tamil Nadu) and Sri Lanka.

== Description ==
Adults reach a length of about 2.7–3.4 mm (0.11–0.13 in). They are orange-yellow to reddish, the head with a black macula and the pronotum with two black maculae on the posterior margin and two discal black spots. The scutellum is yellowish with a black border and the elytra are orange-yellow with a black stripe and a black basal margin.

== Life history ==
They prey on aphids.
