= Comocritis thespias =

Scientific classification
- Domain: Eukaryota
- Kingdom: Animalia
- Phylum: Arthropoda
- Class: Insecta
- Order: Lepidoptera
- Family: Xyloryctidae
- Genus: Comocritis
- Species: C. thespias

Binomial name
- Comocritis thespias (Meyrick, 1909)

Synonyms
- Aetherastis thespias Meyrick, 1909

Species of moth

Comocritis thespias is a moth in the family Xyloryctidae. It was described by Edward Meyrick in 1909. It is found in Sri Lanka.

The wingspan is about 34 mm (1.3 in). The forewings are pale greyish ochreous with a white basal fascia, leaving a small spot of ground colour on the base of the costa and with a small white dorsal spot close beyond the fascia. There is a thick white streak along the costa from the fascia to three-fifths. An oblong yellow-ochreous patch extends through the lower part of the disc almost from the basal fascia, terminated by a crescentic white mark in the disc at two-thirds, and a quadrate white tornal spot connected with it, the ground colour above and below this patch suffused with black irroration (speckles). There is an irregular white streak from four-fifths of the costa to the middle of the termen, with a projection inwards from near the upper extremity, the space between this and the preceding white markings suffused with black and irrorated with white. The apical area is yellow ochreous tinged with fuscous. The hindwings are dark grey.
