= Synchalara malacobryas =

Scientific classification
- Domain: Eukaryota
- Kingdom: Animalia
- Phylum: Arthropoda
- Class: Insecta
- Order: Lepidoptera
- Family: Xyloryctidae
- Genus: Synchalara
- Species: S. malacobryas

Binomial name
- Synchalara malacobryas (Meyrick, 1938)

Synonyms
- Synchlara malacobryas Meyrick, 1938

Species of moth

Synchalara malacobryas is a moth in the family Xyloryctidae. It was described by Edward Meyrick in 1938. It is found on New Guinea.
