= Amorbaea subusta =

Scientific classification
- Kingdom: Animalia
- Phylum: Arthropoda
- Class: Insecta
- Order: Lepidoptera
- Family: Xyloryctidae
- Genus: Amorbaea
- Species: A. subusta

Binomial name
- Amorbaea subusta Diakonoff, [1968]

Species of moth

Amorbaea subusta is a moth in the family Xyloryctidae. It was described by Alexey Diakonoff in 1968. It is found on Luzon in the Philippines.

The wingspan is about 25 mm. The forewings are creamy, with a golden gloss, becoming slightly deeper colored towards the base, more so along the dorsum below the fold. There is very narrow blackish-grey suffusion along the dorsum around its middle and sparse sprinkling of dark grey-fuscous scales above the end of the fold, sparsely extended to the middle of the wing breadth. The hindwings are glossy white with a strong golden gloss.
