= Metathrinca tsugensis =

Scientific classification
- Domain: Eukaryota
- Kingdom: Animalia
- Phylum: Arthropoda
- Class: Insecta
- Order: Lepidoptera
- Family: Xyloryctidae
- Genus: Metathrinca
- Species: M. tsugensis

Binomial name
- Metathrinca tsugensis (Kearfott, 1910)

Synonyms
- Ptochoryctis tsugensis Kearfott, 1910

Species of moth

Metathrinca tsugensis is a moth of the family Xyloryctidae. It is native to Japan, but is an introduced species in western Europe and Hawaii.

The wingspan is 16–24 mm. The forewings are shining white, marked with fuscous as follows: over the upper vein of the cell, from just beyond the base to the end of the cell and continuing over vein 6 with branches 7 and 8, with a faint scattering of dark scales over 10 and 11. The lower vein of the cell, from the middle, is heavily overlaid with the dark colour, spreading over veins 2 to 5, the interspaces being more or less white, vein 1b from beyond the base to tornus. The extreme base of the wing is pure white, except the costa, narrowly edged with fuscous to the inner one-third. A dark subterminal line begins at the outer sixth of the costa, and curves outward to vein 6, then inward to the tornus, paralleling the margin, over each vein the colour is darker. Between this and the cilia, the terminal space is overlaid with a lighter shade of cupreous-fuscous, forming a continuous terminal line, but inward interrupted by white spots between the veins. The hindwings are whitish-yellow.

The larvae feed on Pinaceae species, including Tsuga species and Pinus pentaphylla. They produce galls.
