= Linoclostis brachyloga =

Scientific classification
- Kingdom: Animalia
- Phylum: Arthropoda
- Class: Insecta
- Order: Lepidoptera
- Family: Xyloryctidae
- Genus: Linoclostis
- Species: L. brachyloga

Binomial name
- Linoclostis brachyloga Meyrick, 1917

Species of moth

Linoclostis brachyloga is a moth in the family Xyloryctidae. It was described by Edward Meyrick in 1917. It is found on Java in Indonesia.

The wingspan is about 17 mm. The forewings are shining white with the costal edge dark fuscous towards the base. There is a pale brownish subterminal line from three-fourths of the costa to the tornus, right angled in the middle. The apical portion of the costa and termen is indistinctly marked with light brownish on the veins. The hindwings are grey whitish.
