= Micraspis unica =

Scientific classification
- Kingdom: Animalia
- Phylum: Arthropoda
- Clade: Pancrustacea
- Class: Insecta
- Order: Coleoptera
- Suborder: Polyphaga
- Infraorder: Cucujiformia
- Family: Coccinellidae
- Genus: Micraspis
- Species: M. unica

Binomial name
- Micraspis unica Poorani, 2019

Synonyms
- Micraspis unicus

Species of beetle

Micraspis unica is a species of beetle of the family Coccinellidae. It is found in India (Arunachal Pradesh).

== Description ==
Adults reach a length of about 3.33 mm (0.131 in). The head is creamy white or yellow, while the rest of the dorsal surface, as well as the ventral surface are yellowish. The pronotum has a pale yellowish-brown marking. The lateral margins of the pronotum and elytra are transparent.
