= Comocritis uranias =

Scientific classification
- Domain: Eukaryota
- Kingdom: Animalia
- Phylum: Arthropoda
- Class: Insecta
- Order: Lepidoptera
- Family: Xyloryctidae
- Genus: Comocritis
- Species: C. uranias

Binomial name
- Comocritis uranias (Meyrick, 1909)

Synonyms
- Aetherastis uranias Meyrick, 1909

Species of moth

Comocritis uranias is a moth in the family Xyloryctidae. It was described by Edward Meyrick in 1909. It is found in Sri Lanka.

The wingspan is about 28 mm (1.1 in). The forewings are white closely speckled with black and suffused with bright pale blue except along the costal edge and at the base. There are black basal dots on the costa and in the middle and two small round black spots near the base, median and subdorsal, and three others near beyond these: subcostal, median, and subdorsal. The hindwings are pale grey tinged with whitish.
