= Thymiatris cephalochra =

Scientific classification
- Domain: Eukaryota
- Kingdom: Animalia
- Phylum: Arthropoda
- Class: Insecta
- Order: Lepidoptera
- Family: Xyloryctidae
- Genus: Thymiatris
- Species: T. cephalochra

Binomial name
- Thymiatris cephalochra (Lower, 1894)

Synonyms
- Cryptophaga cephalochra Lower, 1894

Species of moth

Thymiatris cephalochra is a moth in the family Xyloryctidae. It was described by Oswald Bertram Lower in 1894. It is found in Australia, where it has been recorded from New South Wales and Queensland.
