= Metathrinca loranthivora =

Scientific classification
- Kingdom: Animalia
- Phylum: Arthropoda
- Class: Insecta
- Order: Lepidoptera
- Family: Xyloryctidae
- Genus: Metathrinca
- Species: M. loranthivora

Binomial name
- Metathrinca loranthivora (Meyrick, 1937)

Synonyms
- Ptochryctis loranthivora Meyrick, 1937

Species of moth

Metathrinca loranthivora is a moth in the family Xyloryctidae. It was described by Edward Meyrick in 1937. It is found on Java in Indonesia.

The larvae have been recorded feeding in the shoots of Loranthus species.
