= Metathrinca sinumbra =

Scientific classification
- Domain: Eukaryota
- Kingdom: Animalia
- Phylum: Arthropoda
- Class: Insecta
- Order: Lepidoptera
- Family: Xyloryctidae
- Genus: Metathrinca
- Species: M. sinumbra

Binomial name
- Metathrinca sinumbra Diakonoff, [1968]

Species of moth

Metathrinca sinumbra is a moth in the family Xyloryctidae. It was described by Alexey Diakonoff in 1968. It is found on Luzon in the Philippines.
