= Metathrinca =

Scientific classification
- Kingdom: Animalia
- Phylum: Arthropoda
- Clade: Pancrustacea
- Class: Insecta
- Order: Lepidoptera
- Family: Xyloryctidae
- Genus: Metathrinca; Meyrick, 1908

Species
- 20+ (see text)

Moth genus in family Xyloryctidae

Metathrinca is a genus of Gelechioid moths that belongs to the family Xyloryctidae. Members of this genus can be found in the Oriental region with at least eight being found in China.

== Taxonomy ==
This genus was described in 1908 by Edward Meyrick, an English amateur entomologist considered an expert on the systematics of microlepidoptera.

=== Species ===
There are more than 20 species that belong to this genus. Below is a list of species:

- Metathrinca ancistrias (Meyrick, 1906)
- Metathrinca argentea Wang, Zheng & Li, 2000
- Metathrinca breviprocessa Li, 2026
- Metathrinca ceromorpha (Meyrick, 1923)
- Metathrinca coenophyes Diakonoff, [1968]
- Metathrinca crassiprocessa Li, 2026
- Metathrinca digitiloba Li, 2026
- Metathrinca fopingensis Wang, Zheng & Li, 2000
- Metathrinca fortispina Li, 2026
- Metathrinca graciliphalla Li, 2026
- Metathrinca illuvialis (Meyrick, 1914)
- Metathrinca intacta (Meyrick, 1938)
- Metathrinca iridostoma Diakonoff, [1968]
- Metathrinca licina Li, 2026
- Metathrinca lingugnathos Li, 2026
- Metathrinca loranthivora (Meyrick, 1937)
- Metathrinca meihuashana Wang, Zheng & Li, 2000
- Metathrinca memnon Meyrick, 1914
- Metathrinca nigrivenosa Li, 2026
- Metathrinca ophiura Meyrick, 1908
- Metathrinca parabola (Meyrick, 1914)
- Metathrinca pernivis Diakonoff, [1968]
- Metathrinca punctuatella Li, 2026
- Metathrinca rosaria (Meyrick, 1907)
- Metathrinca sinumbra Diakonoff, [1968]
- Metathrinca sublunata Li, 2026
- Metathrinca tsugensis (Kearfott, 1910)
