= Metathrinca memnon =

Scientific classification
- Kingdom: Animalia
- Phylum: Arthropoda
- Class: Insecta
- Order: Lepidoptera
- Family: Xyloryctidae
- Genus: Metathrinca
- Species: M. memnon

Binomial name
- Metathrinca memnon Meyrick, 1914

Species of moth

Metathrinca memnon is a moth in the family Xyloryctidae. It was described by Edward Meyrick in 1914. It is found in Sri Lanka.

The wingspan is about 24 mm. The forewings are silvery white with the costal edge blackish towards the base and a slender slightly curved blackish streak from the dorsum beyond the middle, reaching about halfway across the wing. There are several very fine linear dark-fuscous marks around the apex and termen. The hindwings are ochreous whitish.
