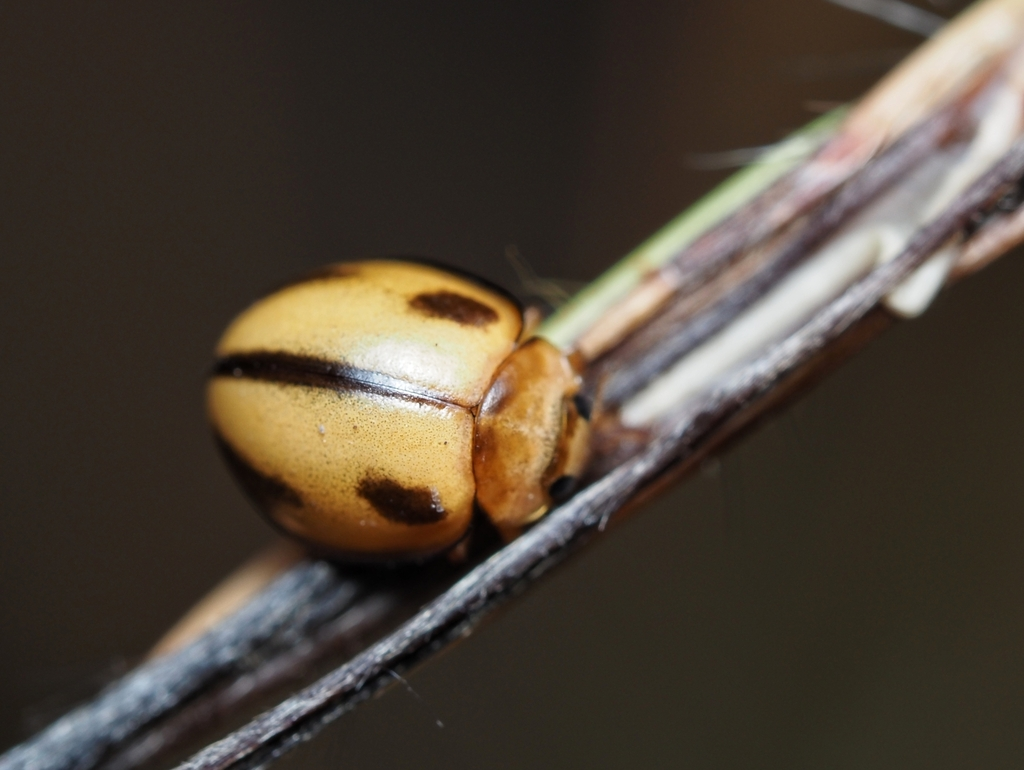

Scientific classification
- Kingdom: Animalia
- Phylum: Arthropoda
- Clade: Pancrustacea
- Class: Insecta
- Order: Coleoptera
- Suborder: Polyphaga
- Infraorder: Cucujiformia
- Family: Coccinellidae
- Genus: Micraspis
- Species: M. aphidectoides

Binomial name
- Micraspis aphidectoides (Korschefsky, 1934)

Synonyms
- Verania aphidectoides Korschefsky, 1934

= Micraspis aphidectoides =

Species of beetle

Micraspis aphidectoides is a species of beetle of the family Coccinellidae. It is found in Australia (Northern Territory, Western Australia).

== Description ==
Adults reach a length of about 4.7–5.6 mm (0.19–0.22 in). The head and antennae are yellow and the pronotum is also yellow, but with a dark medial area at the base. The scutellum is dark brown and the elytra are yellow, each with two longitudinal brown markings and with the external borders and suture dark.
