= Epichostis barathrias =

Scientific classification
- Kingdom: Animalia
- Phylum: Arthropoda
- Class: Insecta
- Order: Lepidoptera
- Family: Xyloryctidae
- Genus: Epichostis
- Species: E. barathrias

Binomial name
- Epichostis barathrias (Meyrick, 1908)

Synonyms
- Hermogenes barathrias Meyrick, 1908

Species of moth

Epichostis barathrias is a moth in the family Xyloryctidae. It was described by Edward Meyrick in 1908. It is found in Sri Lanka.

The wingspan is 13–17 mm. The forewings are dark purplish fuscous with the extreme costal edge pale yellowish in males, except towards the extremities. The markings are blackish, with a slight ferruginous tinge, obscurely edged with ochreous whitish. There is a variable transverse or subtriangular blotch from the dorsum before the middle, reaching three-fourths of the way across the wing. The second discal stigma is rather large and there is a rather narrow straight subterminal fascia, the anterior edge curved inwards on the upper half, the posterior edge not pale margined. There is also a blackish terminal line. The hindwings are dark grey.
