= Synchalara rhizograpta =

Scientific classification
- Domain: Eukaryota
- Kingdom: Animalia
- Phylum: Arthropoda
- Class: Insecta
- Order: Lepidoptera
- Family: Xyloryctidae
- Genus: Synchalara
- Species: S. rhizograpta

Binomial name
- Synchalara rhizograpta Meyrick, 1934

Species of moth

Synchalara rhizograpta is a moth in the family Xyloryctidae. It was described by Edward Meyrick in 1934. It is found in Guangdong, China.
