= Linoclostis =

Scientific classification
- Kingdom: Animalia
- Phylum: Arthropoda
- Class: Insecta
- Order: Lepidoptera
- Family: Xyloryctidae
- Genus: Linoclostis; Meyrick, 1908

Moth genus in family Xyloryctidae

Linoclostis is a genus of moths of the family Xyloryctidae.

== Species ==
- Linoclostis brachyloga Meyrick, 1917
- Linoclostis gonatias Meyrick, 1908
- Linoclostis musicodes Meyrick, 1910
