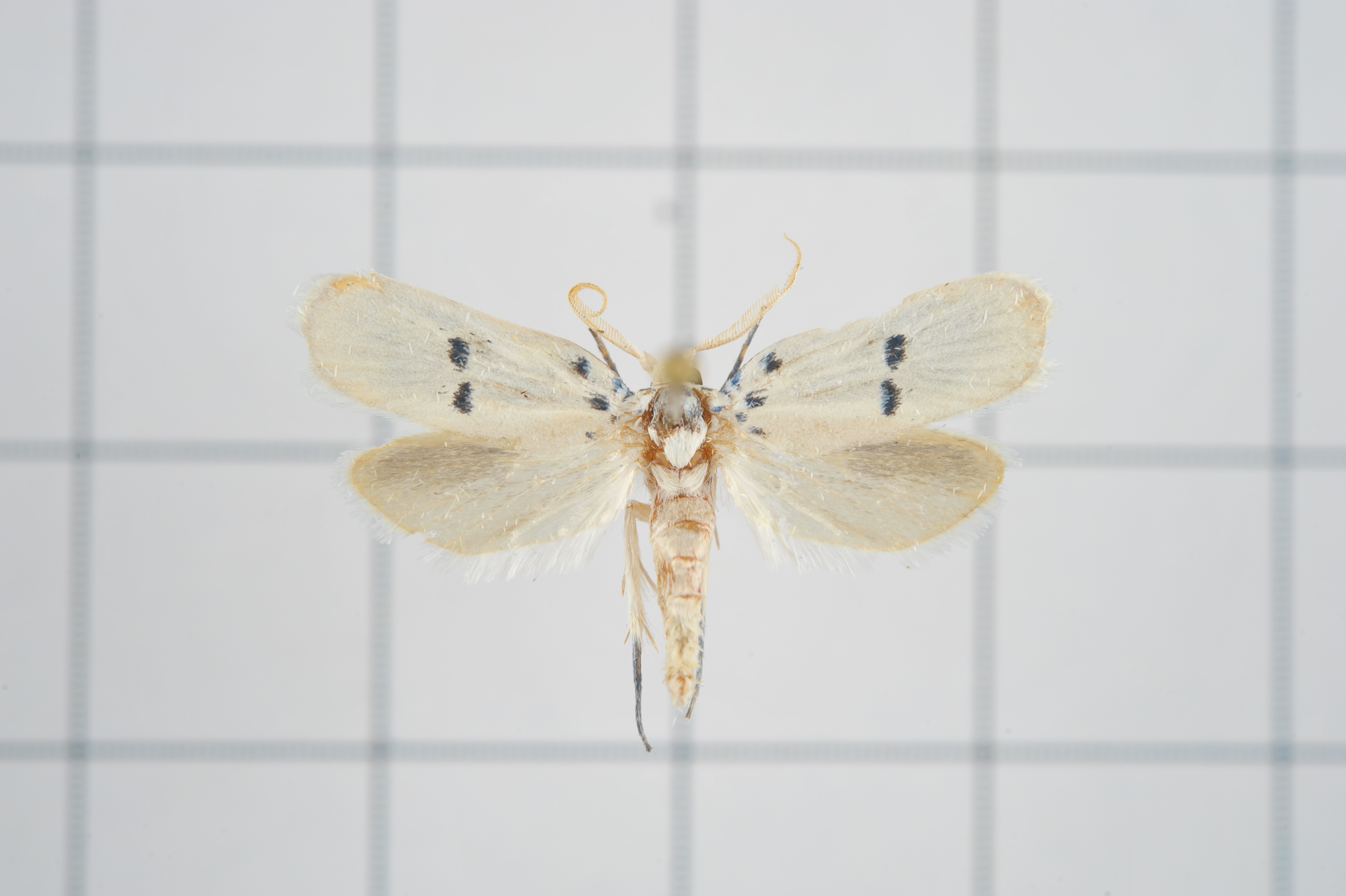
- Comocritis albicapilla

Scientific classification
- Domain: Eukaryota
- Kingdom: Animalia
- Phylum: Arthropoda
- Class: Insecta
- Order: Lepidoptera
- Family: Xyloryctidae
- Genus: Comocritis; Meyrick, 1894

Species
- See text

Synonyms
- Aetherastis Meyrick, 1909

= Comocritis =

Genus of moths

Comocritis is a genus of moths of the family Xyloryctidae.

== Species ==
- Comocritis albicapilla Moriuti, 1974
- Comocritis circulata Meyrick, 1918
- Comocritis constellata Meyrick, 1909
- Comocritis cyanobactra Meyrick, 1922
- Comocritis enneora Meyrick, 1914
- Comocritis heliconia Meyrick, 1933
- Comocritis nephelista Meyrick, 1914
- Comocritis olympia Meyrick, 1894
- Comocritis pieria Meyrick, 1906
- Comocritis pindarica Meyrick, 1924
- Comocritis praecolor Meyrick, 1914
- Comocritis thespias Meyrick, 1909
- Comocritis uranias Meyrick, 1909
