= Micraspis confusa =

Scientific classification
- Kingdom: Animalia
- Phylum: Arthropoda
- Clade: Pancrustacea
- Class: Insecta
- Order: Coleoptera
- Suborder: Polyphaga
- Infraorder: Cucujiformia
- Family: Coccinellidae
- Genus: Micraspis
- Species: M. confusa

Binomial name
- Micraspis confusa Pope, 1989

Species of beetle

Micraspis confusa is a species of beetle of the family Coccinellidae. It is found in Australia (Queensland).

== Description ==
Adults reach a length of about 4.2–5 mm (0.17–0.20 in). The head is yellow, with an anteromedial dark patch in females. The pronotum is yellow with a black basal border and two short bands. The scutellum is black and the elytra are yellow with longitudinal stripes, and with the external borders and suture black.
