= Metathrinca argentea =

Scientific classification
- Domain: Eukaryota
- Kingdom: Animalia
- Phylum: Arthropoda
- Class: Insecta
- Order: Lepidoptera
- Family: Xyloryctidae
- Genus: Metathrinca
- Species: M. argentea

Binomial name
- Metathrinca argentea Wang, Zheng & Li, 2000

Species of moth

Metathrinca argentea is a moth in the family Xyloryctidae. It was described by Wang, Zheng and Li in 2000. It is found in China (Henan).
