= Amorbaea subtusvena =

Scientific classification
- Kingdom: Animalia
- Phylum: Arthropoda
- Class: Insecta
- Order: Lepidoptera
- Family: Xyloryctidae
- Genus: Amorbaea
- Species: A. subtusvena

Binomial name
- Amorbaea subtusvena Diakonoff, [1968]

Species of moth

Amorbaea subtusvena is a moth in the family Xyloryctidae. It was described by Alexey Diakonoff in 1968. It is found on Luzon in the Philippines.
