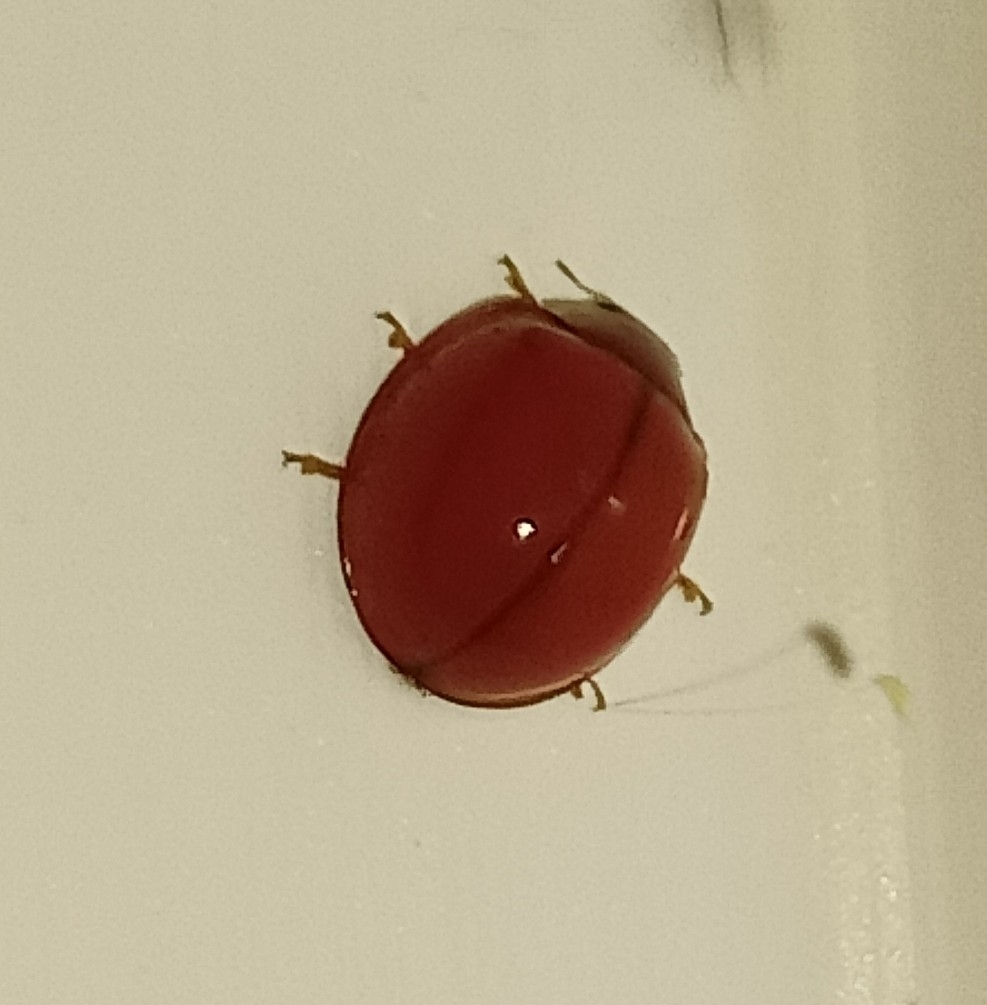

Scientific classification
- Kingdom: Animalia
- Phylum: Arthropoda
- Clade: Pancrustacea
- Class: Insecta
- Order: Coleoptera
- Suborder: Polyphaga
- Infraorder: Cucujiformia
- Family: Coccinellidae
- Genus: Micraspis
- Species: M. yasumatsui

Binomial name
- Micraspis yasumatsui Sasaji, 1968

= Micraspis yasumatsui =

Species of beetle

Micraspis yasumatsui is a species of beetle of the family Coccinellidae. It is found in India (Assam, Meghalaya, Nagaland, Odisha, Tripura, Uttar Pradesh, West Bengal) and Bangladesh.

== Description ==
Adults reach a length of about 6.2 mm (0.24 in). The head and pronotum are yellowish-orange, while the elytra are brighter reddish or orange. The pronotum has pale brown markings.

== Life history ==
They have been recorded preying on Aphis gossypii, Myzus persicae and Bemisia tabaci.
