= Thymiatris arista =

Scientific classification
- Domain: Eukaryota
- Kingdom: Animalia
- Phylum: Arthropoda
- Class: Insecta
- Order: Lepidoptera
- Family: Xyloryctidae
- Genus: Thymiatris
- Species: T. arista

Binomial name
- Thymiatris arista Diakonoff, [1968]

Species of moth

Thymiatris arista is a moth in the family Xyloryctidae. It was described by Alexey Diakonoff in 1968. It is found on Luzon in the Philippines.

The wingspan is about 40 mm. The forewings are white, the costa as far as the upper edge of the cell irregularly suffused with dark brown, this color extending toward the base to the fold, but interrupted by white irregular suffusion between the veins above the cell. All veins on the lower two-thirds of the disc are marked by series of dark brown scales and there is a dark brown streak along the closing vein. dark brown scales are rather regularly scattered over the dorsal part of the wing and there is a rather broad transverse and inwardly oblique subterminal fascia of dark fuscous suffusion, more or less interrupted between the veins, from the costa before the apex. Another such fascia, from the same point of the costa, but gradually diverging with the first, curved outwards, below running along the termen, is formed by a series of more or less interconnected round spots. The posterior fourth or third of the costa, apex, and termen beyond the preceding fascia is tawny ochreous. The hindwings are glossy pale greyish bronze, slightly infuscated along the edge.
