= Metathrinca ophiura =

Scientific classification
- Domain: Eukaryota
- Kingdom: Animalia
- Phylum: Arthropoda
- Class: Insecta
- Order: Lepidoptera
- Family: Xyloryctidae
- Genus: Metathrinca
- Species: M. ophiura

Binomial name
- Metathrinca ophiura Meyrick, 1908

Species of moth

Metathrinca ophiura is a moth in the family Xyloryctidae. It was described by Edward Meyrick in 1908. It is found in Sri Lanka.

The wingspan is 13–15 mm. The forewings are shining white with an irregular moderate pale greyish-silvery partially brownish-suffused fascia extending around the apical fourth of the costa and upper half of the termen, then suddenly curved inwards and terminating on the dorsum before the tornus, edged with blackish on the costal portion and around the apical margin, and suffusedly blackish edged towards the dorsum, the anterior edge in the middle emitting a cloudy fuscous streak-like projection. The hindwings are whitish.
