= Comocritis constellata =

Scientific classification
- Domain: Eukaryota
- Kingdom: Animalia
- Phylum: Arthropoda
- Class: Insecta
- Order: Lepidoptera
- Family: Xyloryctidae
- Genus: Comocritis
- Species: C. constellata

Binomial name
- Comocritis constellata (Meyrick, 1914)

Synonyms
- Aetherastis constellata Meyrick, 1914

Species of moth

Comocritis constellata is a moth in the family Xyloryctidae. It was described by Edward Meyrick in 1914. It is found in Sri Lanka.

The wingspan is about 16 mm (0.63 in). The forewings are whitish ochreous with a basal group of five rather large blackish dots: one median near the base, one subdorsal near the base, one beneath the costa at one-fourth, one below this beneath the fold, and one in the disc slightly beyond these. The hindwings are pale ochreous grey.
