= Micraspis bennigseni =

Scientific classification
- Kingdom: Animalia
- Phylum: Arthropoda
- Clade: Pancrustacea
- Class: Insecta
- Order: Coleoptera
- Suborder: Polyphaga
- Infraorder: Cucujiformia
- Family: Coccinellidae
- Genus: Micraspis
- Species: M. bennigseni

Binomial name
- Micraspis bennigseni (Weise, 1903)

Synonyms
- Verania bennigseni Weise, 1903

Species of beetle

Micraspis bennigseni is a species of beetle of the family Coccinellidae. It is found in Indonesia (Western New Guinea) and Papua New Guinea.

== Description ==
Adults reach a length of about 3.8–4.1 mm (0.15–0.16 in). The frons is yellow in males, while the frons of the females has a black patch in the centre. The pronotum is black with yellow areas. The elytra are yellow with black borders and a central black area. The scutellum is black.
