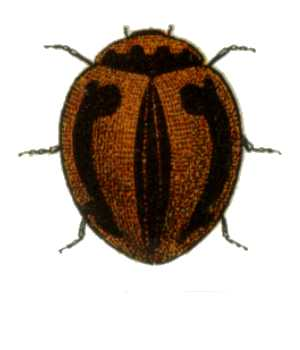

Scientific classification
- Kingdom: Animalia
- Phylum: Arthropoda
- Clade: Pancrustacea
- Class: Insecta
- Order: Coleoptera
- Suborder: Polyphaga
- Infraorder: Cucujiformia
- Family: Coccinellidae
- Genus: Micraspis
- Species: M. frenata

Binomial name
- Micraspis frenata (Erichson, 1842)

Synonyms
- Coccinella frenata Erichson, 1842; Coccinella bicruciata Montrouzier, 1861; Coelophora vittipennis Fauvel, 1903

= Micraspis frenata =

Species of beetle

Micraspis frenata, the striped ladybird, is a ladybird species endemic to Tasmania and the mainland eastern states of Australia. It is also present in New Caledonia.

== Description ==
Adults reach a length of about 3.7–4.7 mm (0.15–0.19 in). The head is yellow and the pronotum is yellow anteriorly, but with the base area black and the lateral margin transparent. The scutellum is black and the elytra are yellow with black external borders, suture and dorsal stripe.
