= Comocritis pindarica =

Scientific classification
- Domain: Eukaryota
- Kingdom: Animalia
- Phylum: Arthropoda
- Class: Insecta
- Order: Lepidoptera
- Family: Xyloryctidae
- Genus: Comocritis
- Species: C. pindarica

Binomial name
- Comocritis pindarica Meyrick, 1924

Species of moth

Comocritis pindarica is a moth in the family Xyloryctidae. It was described by Edward Meyrick in 1924. It is found on New Guinea.

The wingspan is about 34 mm (1.3 in). The forewings are light golden brownish suffusedly irrorated (sprinkled) with purple, with fine black lines on the veins of the discal and dorsal areas and a white streak across the base, from the middle of which an angulated lobe runs to the costa near the base, then continued as a costal streak to the middle, then rather diverging to above a curved-transverse white bar on the end of the cell. Near beyond this is some slight transverse white suffusion, connected by three black lines on the veins with a posterior streak. There is a transverse white streak from the tornus to beyond the lower end of the discal bar and a short white streak along the costa towards four-fifths, from the end of which an irregular white streak runs to the middle of the termen, the included apical area bright ochreous, tinged white at the apex. The hindwings are rather light grey, the apex suffused white.
