= Epichostis =

Scientific classification
- Domain: Eukaryota
- Kingdom: Animalia
- Phylum: Arthropoda
- Class: Insecta
- Order: Lepidoptera
- Family: Xyloryctidae
- Genus: Epichostis; Meyrick, 1906

Moth genus in family Xyloryctidae

Epichostis is a genus of moths of the family Xyloryctidae.

== Species ==
- Epichostis antigama (Meyrick, 1908)
- Epichostis barathrias (Meyrick, 1908)
- Epichostis cryphaea (Meyrick, 1908)
- Epichostis deltata Yuan & Wang, 2009
- Epichostis dicremna (Meyrick, 1908)
- Epichostis elephantias Meyrick, 1906
- Epichostis hamatilis Yuan & Wang, 2009
- Epichostis jiangkouensis Yuan & Wang, 2009
- Epichostis leptorthra Meyrick, 1931
- Epichostis leucorma (Meyrick, 1908)
- Epichostis magnimacularis Yuan & Wang, 2009
- Epichostis melanocona (Meyrick, 1908)
- Epichostis metrodelta (Meyrick, 1905)
- Epichostis microdelta Meyrick, 1928
- Epichostis proximitympanias Yuan & Wang, 2009
- Epichostis setilata Yuan & Wang, 2009
- Epichostis stelota (Meyrick, 1908)
- Epichostis subrotunda Yuan & Wang, 2009
- Epichostis termiprotrusa Yuan & Wang, 2009
- Epichostis termitruncatula Yuan & Wang, 2009
- Epichostis tympanias (Meyrick, 1908)
- Epichostis wenxianica Yuan & Wang, 2009
- Epichostis wufengensis Yuan & Wang, 2009
