= Metathrinca fopingensis =

Scientific classification
- Kingdom: Animalia
- Phylum: Arthropoda
- Clade: Pancrustacea
- Class: Insecta
- Order: Lepidoptera
- Family: Xyloryctidae
- Genus: Metathrinca
- Species: M. fopingensis

Binomial name
- Metathrinca fopingensis Wang, Zheng & Li, 2000

Species of moth

Metathrinca fopingensis is a moth in the family Xyloryctidae. It was described by Wang, Zheng and Li in 2000. It is found in China (Shaanxi).
