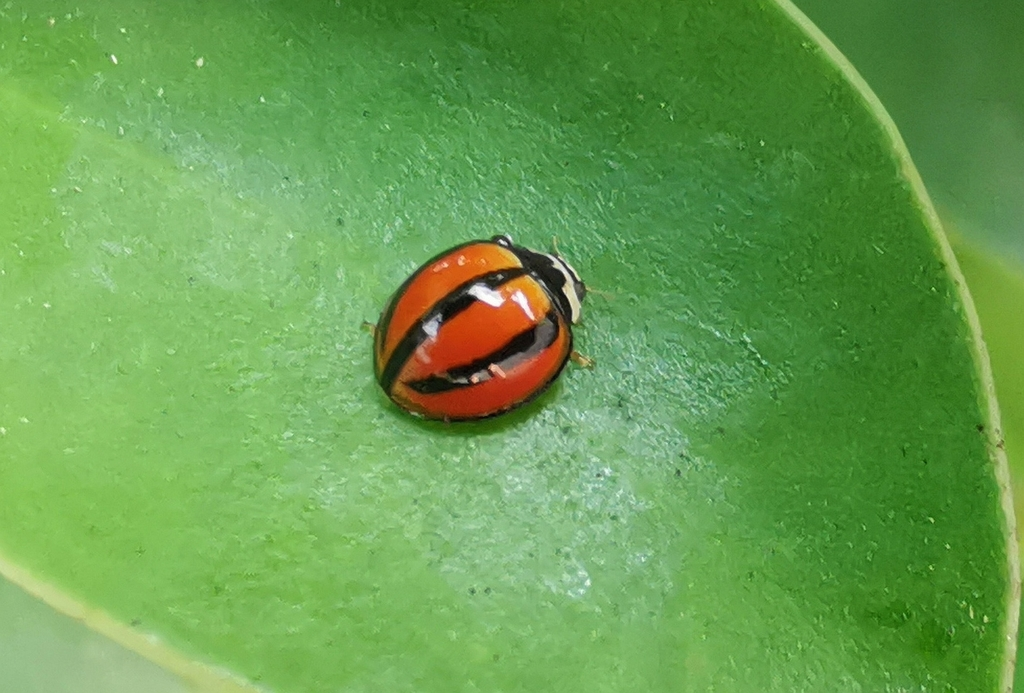

Scientific classification
- Kingdom: Animalia
- Phylum: Arthropoda
- Clade: Pancrustacea
- Class: Insecta
- Order: Coleoptera
- Suborder: Polyphaga
- Infraorder: Cucujiformia
- Family: Coccinellidae
- Genus: Micraspis
- Species: M. univittata

Binomial name
- Micraspis univittata (Hope, 1831)

Synonyms
- Coccinella univittata Hope, 1831; Alesia inconsiderata Mulsant, 1866

= Micraspis univittata =

Species of beetle

Micraspis univittata is a species of beetle of the family Coccinellidae. It is found in India (Andhra Pradesh, Arunachal Pradesh, Assam, Bihar, Karnataka, Kerala, Odisha, Manipur, Tamil Nadu, Tripura), Bhutan, Nepal, China and Myanmar.

== Description ==
Adults reach a length of about 3–4.5 mm (0.12–0.18 in). They are bright carmine red, orange or yellow, with the head and pronotum reddish or yellowish. The head has a black macula on the basal half and the pronotum has a basal black macula and two discal spots. The elytra have two curved black stripes and a black sutural stripe.

== Life history ==
They mainly prey on aphids.
