= Epichostis termiprotrusa =

Scientific classification
- Domain: Eukaryota
- Kingdom: Animalia
- Phylum: Arthropoda
- Class: Insecta
- Order: Lepidoptera
- Family: Xyloryctidae
- Genus: Epichostis
- Species: E. termiprotrusa

Binomial name
- Epichostis termiprotrusa Yuan & Wang, 2009

Species of moth

Epichostis termiprotrusa is a moth in the family Xyloryctidae. It was described by Yuan and Wang in 2009. It is found in China.
