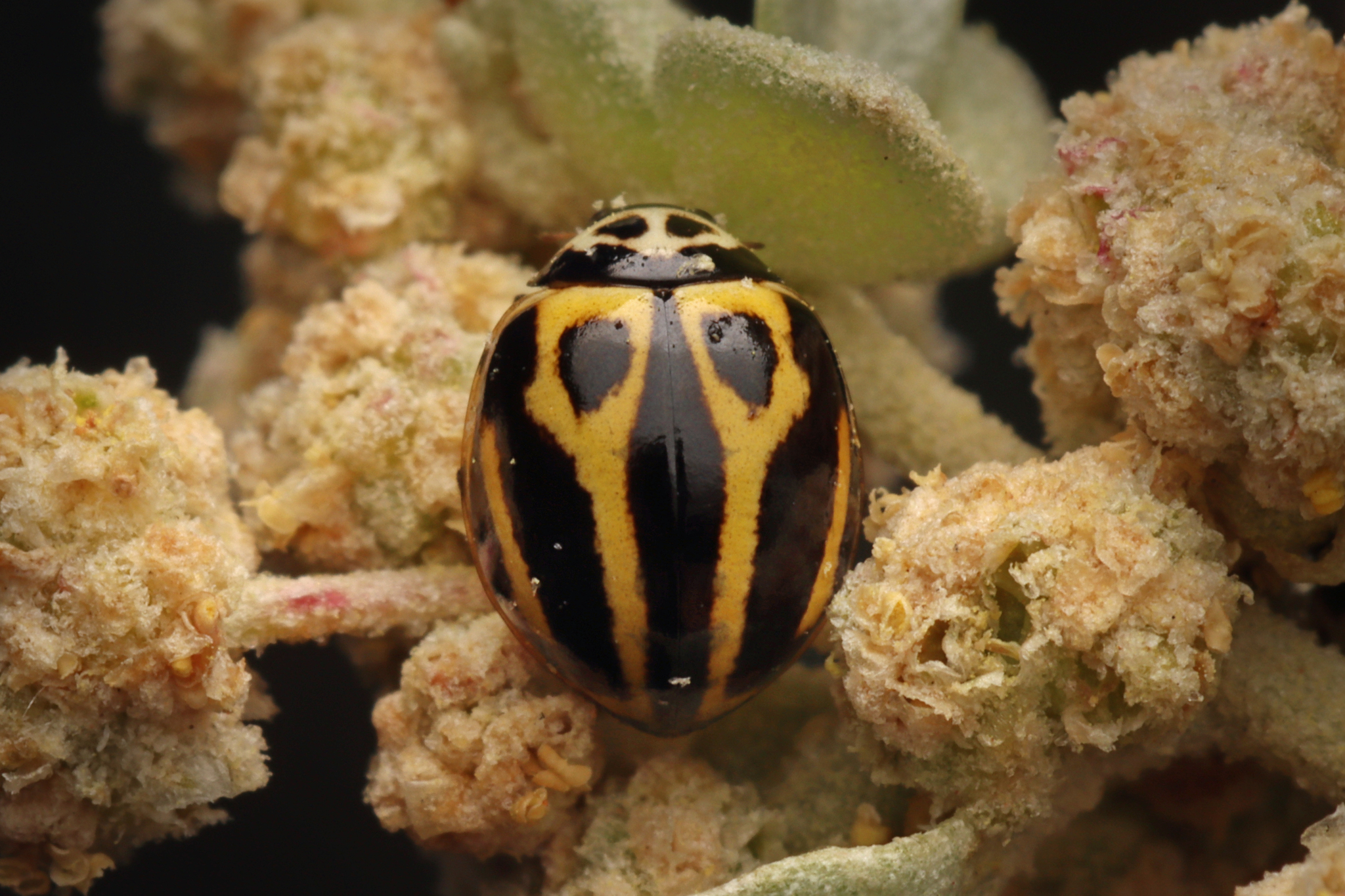
- Micraspis furcifera, Australia

Scientific classification
- Kingdom: Animalia
- Phylum: Arthropoda
- Clade: Pancrustacea
- Class: Insecta
- Order: Coleoptera
- Suborder: Polyphaga
- Infraorder: Cucujiformia
- Family: Coccinellidae
- Subfamily: Coccinellinae
- Tribe: Coccinellini
- Genus: Micraspis; Chevrolat, 1837

Synonyms
- Alesia Mulsant, 1853; Micraspis Hope, 1840; Cisseis Mulsant, 1850 (preocc.); Verania Mulsant, 1850 (preocc.); Cissella Weise, 1895; Menevillidea Brèthes, 1923; Pseudoverania Mader, 1941; Veraniella Kammerer, 2006

= Micraspis (beetle) =

Genus of beetles

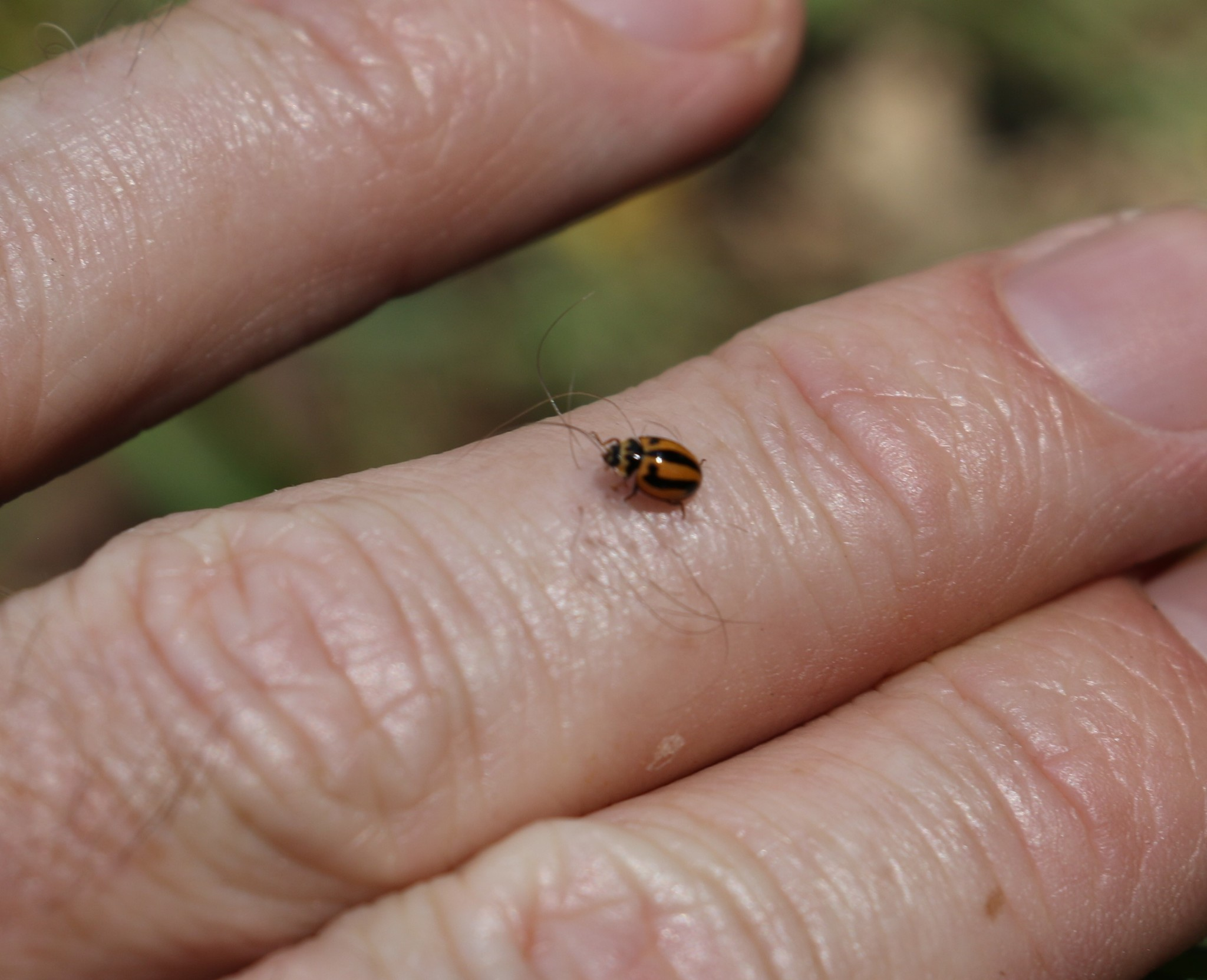
Micraspis frenata, Australia

Micraspis is a genus of lady beetles in the family Coccinellidae. There are at least 20 described species in Micraspis, found mainly in Southeast Asia, Australia, and Africa.

== Species ==
These species belong to the genus Micraspis:

- Micraspis aethiops Fürsch, 2002
- Micraspis afflicta (Mulsant, 1850)
- Micraspis allardi (Mulsant, 1866)
- Micraspis amoenula (Gerstäcker, 1871)
- Micraspis angolensis (Mader, 1952)
- Micraspis aphidectoides (Korschefsky, 1934)
- Micraspis bennigseni (Weise, 1903)
- Micraspis bidentata (Mulsant, 1853)
- Micraspis chinensis
- Micraspis comma
- Micraspis confusa Pope, 1988
- Micraspis connexa
- Micraspis discolor (Fabricius, 1798)
- Micraspis divergens
- Micraspis elongata
- Micraspis emarginata
- Micraspis fairmairei
- Micraspis feae
- Micraspis filapicis
- Micraspis flavomarginata
- Micraspis flavovittata (Crotch, 1874)
- Micraspis frenata (Erichson, 1842)
- Micraspis furcifera (Guérin-Méneville, 1835)
- Micraspis hirashimai
- Micraspis inops
- Micraspis kiotoensis
- Micraspis kurosai
- Micraspis lineata
- Micraspis lineola (Fabricius, 1775)
- Micraspis litterata
- Micraspis longula
- Micraspis madagassa
- Micraspis nigrocingulata
- Micraspis nuda
- Micraspis pentas
- Micraspis perrieri
- Micraspis perroti
- Micraspis pusilla
- Micraspis quadrimaculata
- Micraspis quichauensis
- Micraspis rufa
- Micraspis satoi
- Micraspis sicardi
- Micraspis suturata
- Micraspis taiwanensis
- Micraspis tanalensis
- Micraspis tenuilinea
- Micraspis tonkinensis
- Micraspis torquata
- Micraspis trivittata
- Micraspis unica Poorani, 2019
- Micraspis univittata (Hope, 1831)
- Micraspis vandenbergae
- Micraspis yasumatsui Sasaji, 1968
- Micraspis yunnanensis

== Selected former species ==
- Micraspis guerini (Mulsant, 1850)
- Micraspis striata (Fabricius, 1792)
- Micraspis vincta (Gorham, 1895)
