= Thymiatris seriosa =

Scientific classification
- Domain: Eukaryota
- Kingdom: Animalia
- Phylum: Arthropoda
- Class: Insecta
- Order: Lepidoptera
- Family: Xyloryctidae
- Genus: Thymiatris
- Species: T. seriosa

Binomial name
- Thymiatris seriosa Diakonoff, 1966

Species of moth

Thymiatris seriosa is a moth in the family Xyloryctidae. It was described by Alexey Diakonoff in 1966. It is found in Assam, India.
