= Synchalara minax =

Scientific classification
- Domain: Eukaryota
- Kingdom: Animalia
- Phylum: Arthropoda
- Class: Insecta
- Order: Lepidoptera
- Family: Xyloryctidae
- Genus: Synchalara
- Species: S. minax

Binomial name
- Synchalara minax (Meyrick, 1907)

Synonyms
- Agriophara minax Meyrick, 1907

Species of moth

Synchalara minax is a moth in the family Xyloryctidae. It was described by Edward Meyrick in 1907. It is found in India (Assam).

The wingspan is 22–25 mm. The forewings are whitish-ochreous tinged with brownish and irrorated with fuscous. The basal fourth of the costa suffused with dark fuscous. There is a very indistinct irregular line of fuscous suffusion from the costa at one-fourth to the dorsum before the middle. There is a broad oblique fascia of dark fuscous suffusion, sharply defined and pale-edged anteriorly, very undefined posteriorly, from the costa about the middle, reaching more than half across the wing. A suffused fuscous curved line is found from the costa about three-fourths, almost obsolete on the dorsal half. There is also a marginal row of blackish dots around the apex and termen. The hindwings are pale grey.
