= Metathrinca parabola =

Scientific classification
- Kingdom: Animalia
- Phylum: Arthropoda
- Class: Insecta
- Order: Lepidoptera
- Family: Xyloryctidae
- Genus: Metathrinca
- Species: M. parabola

Binomial name
- Metathrinca parabola (Meyrick, 1914)

Synonyms
- Ptochryctis parabola Meyrick, 1914

Species of moth

Metathrinca parabola is a moth in the family Xyloryctidae. It was described by Edward Meyrick in 1914. It is found in southern India.

The wingspan is about 25 mm. The forewings are silvery white with the costal edge dark fuscous towards the base and the dorsal area tinged with ochreous. There is a submarginal series of blackish dots around the apex and termen, that between veins 5 and 6 is absent, one on each side of this minute, one above the apex and two nearest the tornus large. The hindwings are ochreous white.
