= Linoclostis gonatias =

Scientific classification
- Kingdom: Animalia
- Phylum: Arthropoda
- Class: Insecta
- Order: Lepidoptera
- Family: Xyloryctidae
- Genus: Linoclostis
- Species: L. gonatias

Binomial name
- Linoclostis gonatias Meyrick, 1908

Species of moth

Linoclostis gonatias is a moth in the family Xyloryctidae. It was described by Edward Meyrick in 1908. It is found in India.

The wingspan is about 23 mm. The forewings are shining white with the costal edge dark fuscous towards the base and there is a slender fuscous subterminal line from three-fourths of the costa to the tornus, almost right angled in the middle. There is a slender ochreous-brownish line along the apical sixth of the costa. The hindwings are grey whitish.
