= Ken Whiting =

Canadian kayaker

Ken Whiting (born December 12, 1974), is a Canadian former competitive whitewater kayaker. He won the 1997/98 World Freestyle Kayaking Championship, the 1998 Japan Open Champion, and a five-time Canadian National Champion in freestyle (a.k.a. whitewater) kayaking.

Since 1998, Ken opened a kayaking school, founded the Canadian Freestyle Kayaking Association, and coached the Junior Freestyle Kayaking Team. He produced both the US and Canadian Freestyle Team Trials events, and wrote and produced a series of paddling instructional books and videos. In 2006 he was nominated for an Everest Outdoor Achievement Award. In 2009, Ken produced the first ever kayak fishing TV series, and in 2013, Ken launched Facing Waves, North America's only paddlesport television show.

== Early days ==
Ken was 14 years old when he picked up a kayak paddle for the first time while taking a five-day kayaking course on the Ottawa River in 1989. At 18 he postponed his university plans to pursue whitewater kayaking.

== Championships ==
In 1997, he won the World Freestyle Kayaking Championships.

== Career ==
In 1998, Ken wrote and published The Playboater's Handbook, a reference for freestyle kayaking technique.

Following the 1st book, Ken teamed up with Chris Emerick, an American videographer, and began producing instructional videos. These publishing efforts evolved into an instructional books and videos series about whitewater kayaking and other outdoor pursuits, including sea kayaking, canoeing, and camping.

In 2002, Ken retired from kayak competition.

In 2009, Ken produced his first TV series, for the World Fishing Network. In that same year, Ken released his first WebTV series.

In 2011, Ken sold Heliconia's book and DVD publishing and distribution arm of the business, in order to focus his energies on TV production, WebTV production and social media marketing.

Ken's company now produces six TV series (Kayak Fishing Show, Extreme Kayak Fishing Challenge, Epic Trails, Facing Waves, Kayak Bassin' and Knot Right Kayak Fishing) which air on FOX Sports, Sportsman Channel, Outside Television, and the World Fishing Network.

Ken, his wife Nicole, and their daughter live in Ottawa, bordering the Ottawa River.
