= Comocritis olympia =

Scientific classification
- Domain: Eukaryota
- Kingdom: Animalia
- Phylum: Arthropoda
- Class: Insecta
- Order: Lepidoptera
- Family: Xyloryctidae
- Genus: Comocritis
- Species: C. olympia

Binomial name
- Comocritis olympia Meyrick, 1894

Species of moth

Comocritis olympia is a moth in the family Xyloryctidae. It was described by Edward Meyrick in 1894. It is found in Myanmar and Assam, India.

The wingspan is about 30 mm (1.2 in). The forewings are rather light ochreous grey, densely mixed with blackish grey and with a white basal fascia, as well as a broad white costal streak throughout, suddenly narrowed near the base, the lower edge cloudy and shaded off with blue whitish, interrupted by a light ochreous spot on the costa at two-thirds. There is a longitudinal yellow-ochreous patch, marked with blackish lines on the veins, extending through the lower part of the disc from near the base to three-fourths. A crescentic white spot is found in the disc at two-thirds, and a second, slightly ochreous tinged, at five-sixths. There is also a triangular white spot on the anal angle. The hindwings are grey, with the apex white.
