= Comocritis heliconia =

Scientific classification
- Domain: Eukaryota
- Kingdom: Animalia
- Phylum: Arthropoda
- Class: Insecta
- Order: Lepidoptera
- Family: Xyloryctidae
- Genus: Comocritis
- Species: C. heliconia

Binomial name
- Comocritis heliconia Meyrick, 1933

Species of moth

Comocritis heliconia is a moth in the family Xyloryctidae. It was described by Edward Meyrick in 1933. It is found on Java in Indonesia.
