= Thymiatris melitacma =

Scientific classification
- Domain: Eukaryota
- Kingdom: Animalia
- Phylum: Arthropoda
- Class: Insecta
- Order: Lepidoptera
- Family: Xyloryctidae
- Genus: Thymiatris
- Species: T. melitacma

Binomial name
- Thymiatris melitacma Meyrick, 1907

Species of moth

Thymiatris melitacma is a moth in the family Xyloryctidae. It was described by Edward Meyrick in 1907. It is found in Assam, India.

The wingspan is 42–44 mm. The forewings are ochreous whitish, sprinkled with fuscous and dark fuscous, the costa and subcostal veins are suffused with dark fuscous. There are two cloudy dark fuscous dots placed transversely in the disc beyond three-fifths and traces of a cloudy darker angulated subterminal line. There is also an ochreous-yellowish streak mixed with fuscous around the apex and termen to near the tornus. The hindwings are whitish ochreous.
