= Synchalara byrsina =

Scientific classification
- Kingdom: Animalia
- Phylum: Arthropoda
- Class: Insecta
- Order: Lepidoptera
- Family: Xyloryctidae
- Genus: Synchalara
- Species: S. byrsina

Binomial name
- Synchalara byrsina (Meyrick, 1907)

Synonyms
- Agriophara byrsina Meyrick, 1907

Species of moth

Synchalara byrsina is a moth in the family Xyloryctidae. It was described by Edward Meyrick in 1907. It is found in India (Assam).

The wingspan is 22–25 mm. The forewings are pale greyish-ochreous slightly sprinkled with whitish and dark fuscous, sometimes ochreous-tinged. The dorsum is sometimes suffused with fuscous and the basal fourth of the costa is more or less suffused with dark fuscous. There are subtriangular spots of dark fuscous suffusion on the costa at half and three-fourths, as well as very indistinct traces of suffused fuscous lines from the costa at one-fourth and the two spots, the first hardly traceable, the second very irregular, angulated in the disc, the third curved. The first discal stigma is sometimes fuscous, the second large and dark fuscous. There is also a marginal series of blackish dots around the apex and termen. The hindwings are whitish-grey.
