= Opisina arenosella =

Coconut black headed caterpillar

Scientific classification
- Kingdom: Animalia
- Phylum: Arthropoda
- Clade: Pancrustacea
- Class: Insecta
- Order: Lepidoptera
- Family: Xyloryctidae
- Genus: Opisina
- Species: O. arenosella

Binomial name
- Opisina arenosella Walker, 1864

Species of moth

The Coconut black headed caterpillar (Opisina arenosella), is a species of moth found in throughout East Asian countries including Bangladesh, India, Sri Lanka, Myanmar, as well as Indonesia. It is considered a pest of coconut palm trees, causing considerable damage to the trees, and reducing the plant's yield significantly and can be a major problem where coconuts contribute to the economy. The species exists on coconut palms through its life stages from larval to moth, and utilizes the tree fronds as a main source of nutrition. Various methods of control have been explored, yet the primary control method is the administration of pesticides directly to the root of the coconut palms.

== Identification ==
The coconut black-headed caterpillar is identifiable in the larval form as a caterpillar with greenish brown with dark brown head and prothorax, and a reddish mesothorax. There are often brown stripes on the body of the larva.

Post pupation, the caterpillar morphs into a moth which is greyish white in colour. The female is distinguishable from the male in that it has longer antenna, and three faint spots on the forewings, while the males have fringed hairs in the apical and anal margins of the hind wings.

== Life cycle ==
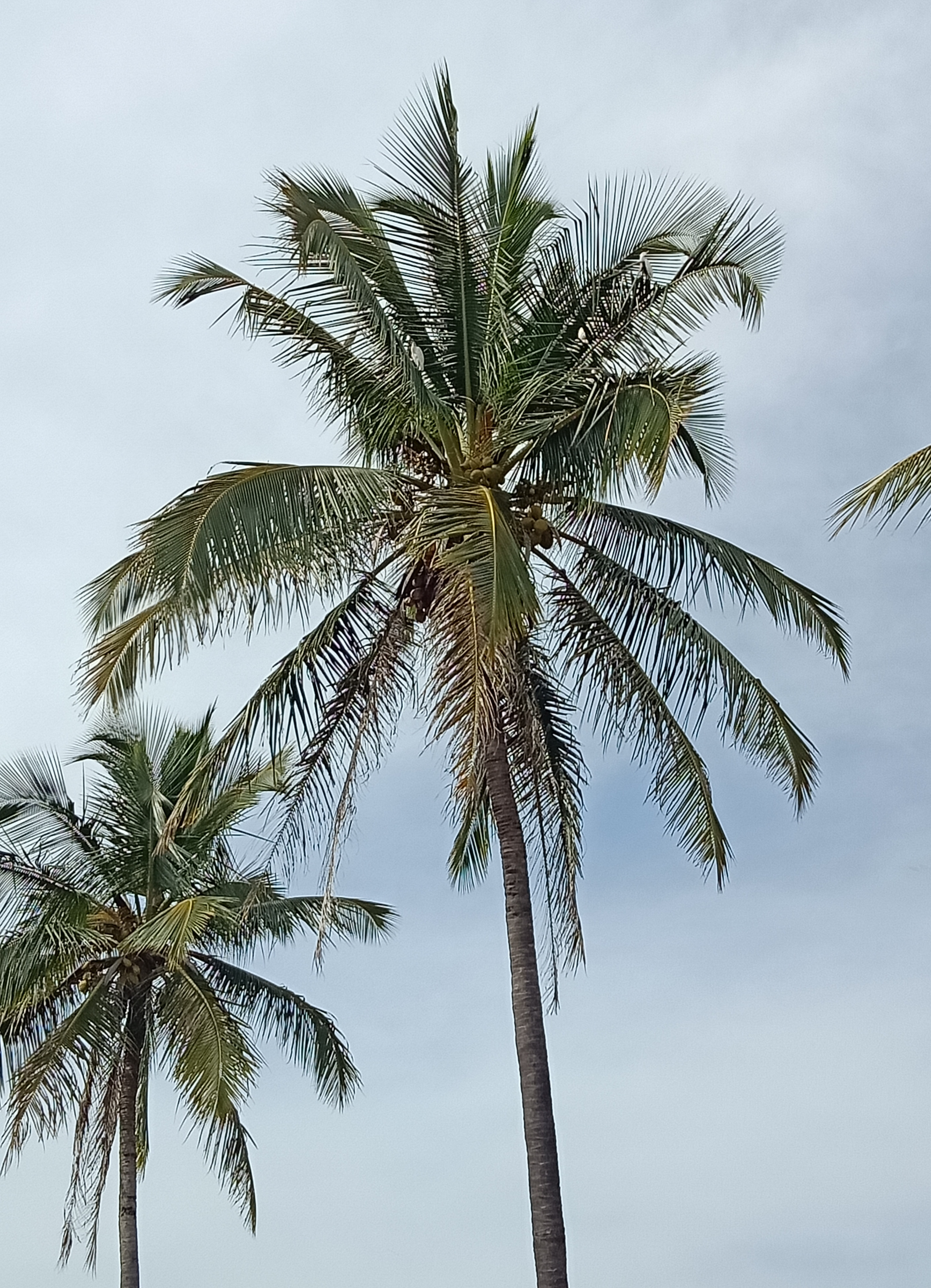
Lower fronds of coconut drying up due to Opisina arenosella infestation

The female moth lays eggs in small groups on the underside of coconut leaflets near to feeding larvae. The larvae hatch from the eggs after three days on average, and then move into the first of a series of larval instars. Larvae of O. arenosella generally go through five instars, but have been recorded to go through as many as eight instars in laboratory settings. Instars from one to five last 6 days, 7 days, 7 days, 5 days, and 10 days respectively, which makes the larval stage approximately 48 days in length. Larvae are generally less than 4.0 mm in size between instars 1 and 3, between 4.0 and 11.0 mm from instars 4 to 6, and larger than 11.0 mm in instars 7 and 8. Some early larval and egg mortality has been observed in O. arenosella as a result of cannibalism on the eggs and younger larvae by older larvae. Adult coconut black-headed caterpillars rest under the surface of the damaged coconut palm leaves, where most of the damage to the coconut fronds can be observed. Larvae construct galleries of silk and frass, into which they retreat if disturbed. These galleries are also where pupation occurs, which lasts approximately eight days. Little is known about the adult (moth) stage of O. arenosella. The organism is nocturnal, but their dispersal patterns are poorly understood.

Larvae are known to infest various palms, including coconut palm, (Cocos nucifera), palmyra palm, (Borassus flabellifer), date palm, (Phoenix dactylifera), wild date palm, (Phoenix sylvestris), royal palm, (Oreodoxa oleracea) and the fan palm, (Livistona chinensis)

Opisina arenosella has a number of different predators from various animal phyla. It has been known to be predated upon by birds, ants, spiders, mites, true bugs of the families Anthocoridae and Reduviidae, and Carabidae beetles. All of these predators aid in keeping the population reduced, however the population size becomes too immense during outbreaks to be maintained merely by predators.

This organism in its larval form is widely affected by a nuclear polyhedrosis virus in the wild and by a number of different pathogens in laboratory settings. Pathogen infestation is a mild threat to O. arenosella, and has not been recorded as causing significant reductions to the population numbers.

== Pest status ==
While Opisina arenosella has been a known pest for decades, it was officially declared a pest in Sri Lanka in 1924, when it became a legal requirement to report any outbreaks to the agricultural authority. The Coconut Research Institute (CRI) became the leading agricultural authority in 1956, and have documents of all reported outbreaks between 1965 & 1985. Approximately 400 outbreaks were recorded in that period of time with many more recorded since Outbreaks of O. arenosella have been recorded mainly in India, Myanmar, Bangladesh, and Indonesia, and pose problems at all times of the year. There is typically an increase in population in the early summer months (March- May), and the species has 4-5 generations annually, with a generation period of 8 weeks.

Outbreaks have been attributed to high levels of humidity, and inversely, decreases in populations have been related to high environmental temperatures with large amounts of sun exposure and heavy rainfall. Years of heavy monsoon tend to yield high population numbers of O. arenosella, and the number of infestations in a region are oftentimes correlated, suggesting a common trigger of the population outbreaks.

In areas of severe outbreak, thousands of palms are affected. O. arenosella consumes the lower epidermis and mesophyll of coconut fronds which contain chlorophyll The result of this eating leaves a characteristic scorched appearance to the leaves, and an inability to maintain their yield. In laboratory settings, the species has been known to consume as much as 1823 mm sq. of coconut frond material. The greatest number of pests are normally found on fronds 12–24, leaving all but the youngest fronds unpopulated and undamaged. The resulting reduction in the plant's yield from the damage has required a great need to develop effective control methods during periods of outbreak in order to maintain the worldwide demand for coconut product, as well as the economies of countries with affected crops.

== Management ==
To date, a number of various management strategies have been tested in reducing and managing the O. arenosella population. Originally management of the species was accomplished by removing the infested fronds of the coconut palms or using light traps in order to physically remove the infestation from the plant, however frond removal reduces the plant's yield drastically, and does not guarantee to resolve the infestation. Chemical insecticides are of course used in the control of O. arenosella; however alternative methods to chemicals have been sought out in order to reduce the chemical residues on the produced fruit, as well as maintain the health of predatory animals such as birds and beneficial arthropods. Another method used is control through the use of biopesticides, which come in many forms. Biopesticides have proven to be as effective as chemical pesticides in many cases. Control of the coconut black-headed caterpillar has been accomplished with the use of both garlic and neem based biopesticides. These treatments act as a poison to the species, and is administered as O. arenosella consume the leaves. In studies, reduction of all stages of larvae as well as pupae were observed and drastically reduced the damage incurred by the palms. Plant pesticides, fly ash and lime have also shown promise as a natural pesticide.

Another method utilized to suppress the population of O. arenosella is the augmentative release of pupal parasitoids. T. embryophagum, Trichogramma, Goniozus nephantidis and Bracon brevicornis are all known parasitoids of the species, and work by parasitizing the larvae at various instars. G. nephantidis and B. brevicornis both parasitoid wasps, parasitize third to seventh instar larvae, leading to the eventual shrivelling and death of the organism. The wasps have been observed parasitizing up to 57% of the resident larvae, which would undoubtedly reduce the population of O. arenosella significantly. While G. nephantidis proves to be the dominant parasitizing species over B. brevicornis due to more developed parental care in B. brevicornis and therefore reduced number of parasitization, they both act as effective species in controlling the Coconut black-headed caterpillar.

Pheromones can act as a means of monitoring and controlling an insect population, while being non-toxic to animals and plants, yet specific to the target pest. Four different sex hormones have been identified and isolated from the female moth O. arenosella, and could potentially be useful in mass trappings, or mating disruption. While considerable progress has been made to adapt and develop this form of control, the current research is still preliminary and needs to be further tested.
