= Neospastis encryphias =

Scientific classification
- Kingdom: Animalia
- Phylum: Arthropoda
- Class: Insecta
- Order: Lepidoptera
- Family: Xyloryctidae
- Genus: Neospastis
- Species: N. encryphias

Binomial name
- Neospastis encryphias (Meyrick, 1907)

Synonyms
- Agriophara encryphias Meyrick, 1907

Species of moth

Neospastis encryphias is a moth in the family of Xyloryctidae. It was described by Edward Meyrick in 1907. It is found in India (Assam).

The wingspan is 23–24 mm. The forewings are white, with some scattered fuscous scales, and the costa is ochreous-tinged. The dorsal half is suffused with light fuscous and with very small fuscous spots on the costa at two-fifths and two-thirds, giving rise to an indistinct oblique series of fuscous dots on the costal half of the wing.

There are cloudy subtriantrular spots of dark fuscous suffusion on the dorsum before the middle and at three-fourths, as well as a terminal series of minute dark fuscous dots. The hindwings are pale grey.
