= Amorbaea hepatica =

Scientific classification
- Kingdom: Animalia
- Phylum: Arthropoda
- Class: Insecta
- Order: Lepidoptera
- Family: Xyloryctidae
- Genus: Amorbaea
- Species: A. hepatica

Binomial name
- Amorbaea hepatica Meyrick, 1908

Species of moth

Amorbaea hepatica is a moth in the family Xyloryctidae. It was described by Edward Meyrick in 1908. It is found in India.

The wingspan is 22–26 mm. The forewings are purple-brownish ochreous, more purplish towards the base and with the costal edge finely yellowish. The hindwings are ochreous yellowish, with a slight fuscous tinge.
