= Hermogenes aliferella =

Scientific classification
- Kingdom: Animalia
- Phylum: Arthropoda
- Clade: Pancrustacea
- Class: Insecta
- Order: Lepidoptera
- Family: Xyloryctidae
- Genus: Hermogenes; Zeller, 1867
- Species: H. aliferella

Binomial name
- Hermogenes aliferella Zeller, 1867

Sole species in xyloryctid moth genus Hermogenes

Hermogenes aliferella is a moth in the family Xyloryctidae, and the only species in the genus Hermogenes. It was described by Philipp Christoph Zeller in 1867 and is found in India.
