= Neospastis ichnaea =

Scientific classification
- Kingdom: Animalia
- Phylum: Arthropoda
- Class: Insecta
- Order: Lepidoptera
- Family: Xyloryctidae
- Genus: Neospastis
- Species: N. ichnaea

Binomial name
- Neospastis ichnaea (Meyrick, 1914)

Synonyms
- Stenoma ichnaea Meyrick, 1914

Species of moth

Neospastis ichnaea is a moth in the family Xyloryctidae. It was described by Edward Meyrick in 1914. It is found in India.

The wingspan is 22–25 mm (0.87–0.98 in). The forewings are whitish fuscous, on the dorsal two-thirds more or less suffused with light fuscous and sprinkled irregularly with dark fuscous. There is a more or less developed fine dark fuscous streak along the fold towards the base and oblique dark fuscous spots on the costa at one-fourth, the middle, and three-fourths. The stigmata are small and dark fuscous, the plical obliquely beyond the first discal. There is also a series of dark fuscous dots around the apex and termen. The hindwings are pale fuscous.

The larvae feed on Symplocos spicata. Feeding between spun leaves, or a broken portion spun on the surface of a whole leaf. The larvae are green, with a brown head, black collar and with a lateral (spiracular) series of black spots, also with black supraspiracular spots on 3, 4, and several of the posterior segments.
