= Epichostis cryphaea =

Scientific classification
- Kingdom: Animalia
- Phylum: Arthropoda
- Class: Insecta
- Order: Lepidoptera
- Family: Xyloryctidae
- Genus: Epichostis
- Species: E. cryphaea

Binomial name
- Epichostis cryphaea (Meyrick, 1908)

Synonyms
- Hermogenes cryphaea Meyrick, 1908

Species of moth

Epichostis cryphaea is a moth in the family Xyloryctidae. It was described by Edward Meyrick in 1908. It is found in Assam, India.

The wingspan is 18–19 mm. The forewings are purplish fuscous irrorated (sprinkled) with dark fuscous and with the extreme costal edge yellowish posteriorly. The discal stigmata are cloudy and dark fuscous, the first connected with the dorsum beyond the middle by an oblique fascia-like patch of dark fuscous suffusion. There are faint traces of a curved darker subterminal streak. The hindwings are fuscous.
