= Trypherantis =

Scientific classification
- Domain: Eukaryota
- Kingdom: Animalia
- Phylum: Arthropoda
- Class: Insecta
- Order: Lepidoptera
- Family: Xyloryctidae
- Genus: Trypherantis; Meyrick, 1907
- Species: T. atelogramma

Binomial name
- Trypherantis atelogramma Meyrick, 1907

Monotypic moth genus in family Xyloryctidae

Trypherantis atelogramma is a moth in the family Xyloryctidae, and the only species in the genus Trypherantis. Genus and species were described by Edward Meyrick in 1907 and are found in India.

The wingspan is 24–26 mm. The forewings are whitish-ochreous with all veins marked by rather irregular lines of blackish irroration, broadly obsolete towards the base and ceasing abruptly near the other margins, the streak of the transverse vein more or less dilated. There is an interrupted blackish line around the apex and termen. The hindwings are whitish-ochreous with a terminal series of fuscous marks.
