= Comocritis pieria =

Scientific classification
- Domain: Eukaryota
- Kingdom: Animalia
- Phylum: Arthropoda
- Class: Insecta
- Order: Lepidoptera
- Family: Xyloryctidae
- Genus: Comocritis
- Species: C. pieria

Binomial name
- Comocritis pieria Meyrick, 1906

Species of moth

Comocritis pieria is a moth in the family Xyloryctidae. It was described by Edward Meyrick in 1906. It is found in Sri Lanka and Assam, India.

The wingspan is 14–19 mm (0.55–0.75 in). The forewings are white with a moderate very undefined basal fascia of blue-grey suffusion. There is a large yellow-ochreous patch occupying the posterior three-fourths of the wing except a white marginal streak, edged with blue grey and finely streaked with blue grey on all the veins. The hindwings are light grey.

The larvae are rather flat, at first reddish, afterwards creamy white. They construct flat canopies and galleries of fine silk and comminuted fragments of bark on the stems of Hevea brasiliensis, feeding on lichens and algae growing on the stem. Pupation takes place in a flattened cocoon or case, formed in a shallow depression beneath the silken canopy.
