= Epichostis stelota =

Scientific classification
- Kingdom: Animalia
- Phylum: Arthropoda
- Class: Insecta
- Order: Lepidoptera
- Family: Xyloryctidae
- Genus: Epichostis
- Species: E. stelota

Binomial name
- Epichostis stelota (Meyrick, 1908)

Synonyms
- Hermogenes stelota Meyrick, 1908

Species of moth

Epichostis stelota is a moth in the family Xyloryctidae. It was described by Edward Meyrick in 1908. It is found in Assam, India.

The wingspan is about 17 mm. The forewings are rather dark fuscous, with a faint purplish tinge. The costal edge and costal extremities of the veins are ferruginous ochreous except towards the base. There is a short subcostal ferruginous streak from the base and there are two narrow blackish fasciae edged with ferruginous, the first about two-fifths, slightly oblique, almost reaching the dorsum but not nearly the costa, the second about two-thirds, direct, reaching the dorsum but not the costa. There are some black scales indicating a curved subterminal line, as well as a blackish terminal line. The hindwings are fuscous.
