= Comocritis circulata =

Scientific classification
- Domain: Eukaryota
- Kingdom: Animalia
- Phylum: Arthropoda
- Class: Insecta
- Order: Lepidoptera
- Family: Xyloryctidae
- Genus: Comocritis
- Species: C. circulata

Binomial name
- Comocritis circulata (Meyrick, 1918)

Synonyms
- Aetherastia circulata Meyrick, 1918

Species of moth

Comocritis circulata is a moth in the family Xyloryctidae. It was described by Edward Meyrick in 1918. It is found in southern India.

The wingspan is about 18 mm (0.71 in). The forewings are white tinged blue, strewn with scattered black scales except towards the base. There are black median and subdorsal dots very near the base, and three others in a slightly curved transverse series at one-fifth. The hindwings are grey.

The larvae feed on Eugenia jambolana.
