= Opisina =

Scientific classification
- Kingdom: Animalia
- Phylum: Arthropoda
- Clade: Pancrustacea
- Class: Insecta
- Order: Lepidoptera
- Family: Xyloryctidae
- Subfamily: Xyloryctinae
- Genus: Opisina; Walker, 1864
- Species: O. arenosella

Binomial name
- Opisina arenosella Walker, 1864

Single-species genus of moths

Opisina is a monotypic genus of moths in the family Xyloryctidae described by Francis Walker in 1864. Its only species, Opisina arenosella, the coconut black-headed caterpillar, was described by the same author in the same year. It is found in India, Sri Lanka, Bangladesh and Myanmar.

The wingspan is 10–15 mm (0.39–0.59 in). Adults are grey.

The larvae are gregarious and are serious pests of coconut trees. They defoliate their host plant.
