= Epichostis leucorma =

Scientific classification
- Kingdom: Animalia
- Phylum: Arthropoda
- Class: Insecta
- Order: Lepidoptera
- Family: Xyloryctidae
- Genus: Epichostis
- Species: E. leucorma

Binomial name
- Epichostis leucorma (Meyrick, 1908)

Synonyms
- Hermogenes leucorma Meyrick, 1908

Species of moth

Epichostis leucorma is a moth in the family Xyloryctidae. It was described by Edward Meyrick in 1908. It is found in Assam, India.

The wingspan is 20–22 mm. The forewings are rather dark ochreous brown with the stigmata dark fuscous, the first sometimes connected with the dorsum by an undefined oblique triangular patch of dark fuscous suffusion. There are a few whitish scales towards the costa and the dorsum about the middle. There is also a subterminal series of seven cloudy white marks, the central and dorsal rather elongated inwards, and a terminal series of six similar marks. The hindwings are grey or dark grey.
