= Epichostis antigama =

Scientific classification
- Kingdom: Animalia
- Phylum: Arthropoda
- Class: Insecta
- Order: Lepidoptera
- Family: Xyloryctidae
- Genus: Epichostis
- Species: E. antigama

Binomial name
- Epichostis antigama (Meyrick, 1908)

Synonyms
- Hermogenes antigama Meyrick, 1908

Species of moth

Epichostis antigama is a moth in the family Xyloryctidae. It was described by Edward Meyrick in 1908. It is found in southern India.

The wingspan is 18–22 mm. The forewings of the males are ochreous yellowish, more or less irrorated (sprinkled) with fuscous except towards the costa, in females rather dark violet fuscous, towards the costa suffused with whitish ochreous, the costal edge ochreous yellow. There is an irregular inwardly oblique wedge-shaped dark fuscous blotch from the dorsum beyond the middle, reaching two-thirds of the way across the wings, in males sometimes reduced to a small dorsal spot, the apex persistent as a blackish first discal stigma. The second discal stigma is also black and there is an irregular narrow subterminal fascia of dark fuscous suffusion, curved inwards on the upper half. There is an interrupted blackish terminal line. The hindwings are ochreous whitish in males and rather dark grey in females.
