= Comocritis cyanobactra =

Scientific classification
- Domain: Eukaryota
- Kingdom: Animalia
- Phylum: Arthropoda
- Class: Insecta
- Order: Lepidoptera
- Family: Xyloryctidae
- Genus: Comocritis
- Species: C. cyanobactra

Binomial name
- Comocritis cyanobactra Meyrick, 1922

Species of moth

Comocritis cyanobactra is a moth in the family Xyloryctidae. It was described by Edward Meyrick in 1922. It is found in Assam, India.

The wingspan is about 16 mm (0.63 in). The forewings are white with the basal third occupied by a group of deep blue markings: a small spot on the base of the costa, two on the dorsum towards the base, two beneath the costa, and one at the base in the middle sending out plical and supramedian dashes. There is a deep blue narrow median streak parallel to the termen not reaching the costa or dorsum. The hindwings are white.
