= Metathrinca ceromorpha =

Scientific classification
- Kingdom: Animalia
- Phylum: Arthropoda
- Class: Insecta
- Order: Lepidoptera
- Family: Xyloryctidae
- Genus: Metathrinca
- Species: M. ceromorpha

Binomial name
- Metathrinca ceromorpha (Meyrick, 1923)

Synonyms
- Ptochoryctis ceromorpha Meyrick, 1923

Species of moth

Metathrinca ceromorpha is a moth in the family Xyloryctidae. It was described by Edward Meyrick in 1923. It is found in Assam, India.

The wingspan is about 25 mm. The forewings are light lilac fuscous, with a suffusion of pale ochreous irroration (sprinkles) gradually increasing upwards, and with the costa pale ochreous. There is an indistinct cloudy fuscous pre-terminal line angulated opposite the apex. The hindwings are light grey.
