= Comocritis enneora =

Scientific classification
- Domain: Eukaryota
- Kingdom: Animalia
- Phylum: Arthropoda
- Class: Insecta
- Order: Lepidoptera
- Family: Xyloryctidae
- Genus: Comocritis
- Species: C. enneora

Binomial name
- Comocritis enneora (Meyrick, 1914)

Synonyms
- Aetherastis enneora Meyrick, 1914

Species of moth

Comocritis enneora is a moth in the family Xyloryctidae. It was described by Edward Meyrick in 1914. It is found in Assam, India.

The wingspan is about 17 mm (0.67 in). The forewings are silvery white with nine small roundish dark leaden-grey spots: one almost basal beneath the costa, one in the disc towards the base, one towards the costa before one-third, one on the fold beneath this, one elongate in the disc before the middle, one above the middle of the disc, one on the fold beyond the middle, one towards the costa before two-thirds, and one in the disc beyond this. The hindwings are grey whitish.
