= Metathrinca illuvialis =

Scientific classification
- Kingdom: Animalia
- Phylum: Arthropoda
- Class: Insecta
- Order: Lepidoptera
- Family: Xyloryctidae
- Genus: Metathrinca
- Species: M. illuvialis

Binomial name
- Metathrinca illuvialis (Meyrick, 1914)

Synonyms
- Ptochryctis illuvialis Meyrick, 1914

Species of moth

Metathrinca illuvialis is a moth in the family Xyloryctidae. It was described by Edward Meyrick in 1914. It is found in Assam, India.

The wingspan is about 26mm. The forewings are whitish ochreous, with a faint grey tinge and with the costal edge dark fuscous towards the base. There is a submarginal series of seven large black dots around the apex and termen. The hindwings are ochreous whitish.
