= Epichostis tympanias =

Scientific classification
- Kingdom: Animalia
- Phylum: Arthropoda
- Class: Insecta
- Order: Lepidoptera
- Family: Xyloryctidae
- Genus: Epichostis
- Species: E. tympanias

Binomial name
- Epichostis tympanias (Meyrick, 1908)

Synonyms
- Hermogenes tympanias Meyrick, 1908

Species of moth

Epichostis tympanias is a moth in the family Xyloryctidae. It was described by Edward Meyrick in 1908. It is found in Assam, India.

The wingspan is 18–23 mm. The forewings are rather light fuscous, somewhat deeper in females. The costal edge, except towards the base, and veins towards the costa are more or less streaked with ferruginous yellow, and the costal area in males variably suffused with light ochreous yellowish. There are two large sharply marked black dorsal blotches, edged with pale yellowish, the first rounded triangular, extending on the dorsum from the base to near two-fifths and reaching more than half across the wing, the second irregular trapezoidal, reaching three-fourths of the way across the wing and extending in the disc from before the middle to five-sixths, but more or less considerably narrowed towards the dorsum, the posterior edge obtusely prominent in the middle of the wing. There is an interrupted black terminal line. The hindwings in males are grey, in females dark grey.
