= Neospastis calpidias =

Scientific classification
- Kingdom: Animalia
- Phylum: Arthropoda
- Class: Insecta
- Order: Lepidoptera
- Family: Xyloryctidae
- Genus: Neospastis
- Species: N. calpidias

Binomial name
- Neospastis calpidias Meyrick, 1917

Species of moth

Neospastis calpidias is a moth in the family Xyloryctidae. It was described by Edward Meyrick in 1917. It is found in southern India.

The wingspan is about 23 mm. The forewings are white, the dorsal two-fifths suffused with pale fuscous and the costal edge dark grey at the base. The plical and second discal stigmata are dark fuscous and there are two oblique transverse series of little-defined dots or groups of fuscous scales, the first from one-fourth of the costa traversing the plical stigma to the apex of an irregular-trapezoidal dark fuscous blotch in the middle of the dorsum, the second very oblique and strongly curved around in the disc to the apex of a triangular similar blotch on tornus. There is a curved series of rather more defined fuscous dots from three-fourths of the costa to the tornal blotch and a terminal scries of black dots. The hindwings are whitish grey.
