= Synchalara rhombota =

Scientific classification
- Domain: Eukaryota
- Kingdom: Animalia
- Phylum: Arthropoda
- Class: Insecta
- Order: Lepidoptera
- Family: Xyloryctidae
- Genus: Synchalara
- Species: S. rhombota

Binomial name
- Synchalara rhombota (Meyrick, 1907)

Synonyms
- Agriophara rhombota Meyrick, 1907

Species of moth

Synchalara rhombota is a moth in the family Xyloryctidae. It was described by Edward Meyrick in 1907. It is found in Assam, India.

The wingspan is 28–38 mm. The forewings are pale whitish ochreous, with scattered dark grey specks and an ill-defined longitudinal streak of dark grey suffusion from the base of the costa through the middle of the disc to three-eighths and three angulated transverse lines of grey suffusion, the first two little defined and often reduced to costal marks, the third usually distinct, running from three-fourths of the costa to the dorsum before the tornus, strongly curved or bent. The plical and second discal stigmata are blackish, the plical linear, the second discal often transverse. There is a series of blackish dots along the posterior part of the costa and termen. The hindwings are ochreous-grey whitish, towards the tornus sprinkled with grey.

The larvae are yellowish red, with the sides yellow orange and a broad blackish subdorsal stripe. The head is black. They feed between spun leaves of the tea bush, and when foliage is stripped will attack the bark, doing great damage.
