= Helicon =

Helicon or Helikon may refer to

== Places ==
- Helicon (river), a former river in the Macedonian city Dion, mentioned in Greek mythology
- Mount Helicon, mountain in Boeotia, Greece
- "Helikon", an 1893 mansion designed by Charles Slayter in Strathfield, New South Wales
- Helikon Park, a park in Randfontein Local Municipality, West Rand District Municipality, Gauteng, South Africa
- Torre Helicon, the fourth tallest building in Monterrey, Mexico
- Helicon Home Colony, an experimental community formed by author Upton Sinclair in Englewood, New Jersey, United States.
- Fictional planet in the Arcturus sector where Hari Seldon was born in the Foundation series of Isaac Asimov

== Arts and entertainment ==
=== Music ===
- Helicon (instrument), a brass musical instrument in the tuba family
- Helicon Mountain, studio of Jools Holland
- Helicon, a 1977 album by The Four Seasons
- Helicon Records, a record label founded in Israel in 1985
- "New Paths to Helicon, Pt. 1" and "New Paths to Helicon, Pt. 2", songs by the Scottish post-rock band Mogwai
- Helikon, a 1952 piano concerto by Mikis Theodorakis
- Helikon Opera, a Moscow-based opera company

=== Other uses in arts and entertainment ===
- Englands Helicon, an anthology of Elizabethan pastoral poems published in 1600
- Helicon Arts Cooperative, a non-profit 501(c)(3) organization which has produced Yesterday Was a Lie and other films
- Heliconian Club, Toronto women's arts society

== Science and technology ==
=== Software ===
- Helicon Filter, a photo editing program
- Helicon Ape, an ASP.NET module to introduce Apache functionality on IIS web servers

=== Other uses in science and technology ===
- Helicon (crater), a lunar impact crater
- Helicon (physics), low frequency electromagnetic waves
- Helikon vortex separation process, used for uranium enrichment
- Helicon Double Layer Thruster, a prototype spacecraft propulsion engine
- Helicon engine, a motorcycle engine that powers the Buell 1125R and 1125CR

== See also ==
- Heliconiinae or Heliconians, a subfamily of butterflies
- Heliconia, a plant genus
