= Xylorycta candescens =

Scientific classification
- Domain: Eukaryota
- Kingdom: Animalia
- Phylum: Arthropoda
- Class: Insecta
- Order: Lepidoptera
- Family: Xyloryctidae
- Genus: Xylorycta
- Species: X. candescens

Binomial name
- Xylorycta candescens Lower, 1896

Synonyms
- lichenaula dissimilis Turner, 1898

Species of moth

Xylorycta candescens is a moth in the family Xyloryctidae. It was described by Oswald Bertram Lower in 1896. It is found in Australia, where it has been recorded from the Northern Territory and Queensland.

The wingspan is 21 mm for males and 26–35 mm for females. The forewings are shining snow white with the extreme costal edge ochreous, becoming indistinct at around the apex and fuscous at the base. There is a broad light fuscous longitudinal streak along the inner margin, from near the base to the anal angle, and continued right through the cilia, somewhat attenuated anteriorly. The hindwings are pale grey.

The larvae feed on Grevillea species, including Grevillea mimosoides. They tie the leaves or seed pods of their host plant with silk.
