= Xylorycta cirrhophragma =

Scientific classification
- Kingdom: Animalia
- Phylum: Arthropoda
- Class: Insecta
- Order: Lepidoptera
- Family: Xyloryctidae
- Genus: Xylorycta
- Species: X. cirrhophragma

Binomial name
- Xylorycta cirrhophragma Meyrick, 1921

Species of moth

Xylorycta cirrhophragma is a moth in the family Xyloryctidae. It was described by Edward Meyrick in 1921. It is found in Australia, where it has been recorded from the Northern Territory and Queensland.

The wingspan is about 20 mm. The forewings are shining white with golden-ochreous markings. There is a slender streak along the costa from the base to three-fifths, infuscated anteriorly. There is also a rather narrow subbasal fascia and a moderate irregular-edged median fascia not quite reaching the dorsum, as well as an irregular incurved fascia from the costa at five-sixths to the dorsum before the tornus with anterior angular prominences above and below the middle, and others posteriorly above the middle and near the dorsum. The hindwings are pale ochreous.

The larvae feed on Grevillea striata.
