= Xylorycta heliomacula =

Scientific classification
- Domain: Eukaryota
- Kingdom: Animalia
- Phylum: Arthropoda
- Class: Insecta
- Order: Lepidoptera
- Family: Xyloryctidae
- Genus: Xylorycta
- Species: X. heliomacula

Binomial name
- Xylorycta heliomacula (Lower, 1894)

Synonyms
- Telecrates heliomacula Lower, 1894

Species of moth

Xylorycta heliomacula is a moth in the family Xyloryctidae. It was described by Oswald Bertram Lower in 1894. It is found in Australia, where it has been recorded from New South Wales, Queensland and the Northern Territory.

The wingspan is about 27 mm. The forewings are dark fuscous, purple shining and with yellow markings. There is an elongate spot immediately beneath the costa at one-third and an irregular quadrate spot immediately beneath on the inner margin before the middle, as well as a large irregular ovate spot just before the apex, beneath which is a smaller spot suffused with three or four lines of ground colour. The hindwings are orange yellow with a narrow fuscous hindmarginal band, broadest at the anal angle.

The larvae feed on Amyema species and Grevillea striata. They bore in the stem of their host plant.
