= Xylorycta ophiogramma =

Scientific classification
- Kingdom: Animalia
- Phylum: Arthropoda
- Class: Insecta
- Order: Lepidoptera
- Family: Xyloryctidae
- Genus: Xylorycta
- Species: X. ophiogramma

Binomial name
- Xylorycta ophiogramma Meyrick, 1890

Species of moth

Xylorycta ophiogramma is a moth in the family Xyloryctidae. It was described by Edward Meyrick in 1890. It is found in Australia, where it has been recorded from Queensland.

The wingspan is 24–28 mm. The forewings are silvery white with dark ochreous-brown markings. There is a slender costal streak from the base to three-fourths, as well as three narrow irregular fasciae, the first very near the base, the second from beyond the middle of the costa to before the middle of the inner margin, slightly sinuate inwards on the lower half. The third is found from the costa before the apex to the anal angle, rather angulated inwards in the middle, the lower extremity connected with the middle of the second fascia by an irregular bar. The hindwings are whitish ochreous, yellowish tinged, towards the apex suffused with light grey.

The larvae feed on Hakea lorea. They bore in the stem of their host plant.
