= Xylorycta parabolella =

Scientific classification
- Kingdom: Animalia
- Phylum: Arthropoda
- Class: Insecta
- Order: Lepidoptera
- Family: Xyloryctidae
- Genus: Xylorycta
- Species: X. parabolella

Binomial name
- Xylorycta parabolella (Walker, 1864)

Synonyms
- Oecophora parabolella Walker, 1864

Species of moth

Xylorycta parabolella is a moth in the family Xyloryctidae. It was described by Francis Walker in 1864. It is found in Australia, where it has been recorded from New South Wales, South Australia, Tasmania and Victoria.

The wingspan is 25–29 mm. The forewings are silvery white with a moderate deep yellow-ochreous longitudinal streak above the middle from the base to the apex. There is a broader similar stripe near the inner margin from the base throughout, touching the inner margin at one-third, at the extremity continued upwards more narrowly along the hindmargin to meet the upper streak at the apex. The hindwings are grey, the extreme apex whitish ochreous.

The larvae feed on Banksia marginata. They bore in the old flower spikes of their host plant.
