= Xylorycta synaula =

Scientific classification
- Kingdom: Animalia
- Phylum: Arthropoda
- Class: Insecta
- Order: Lepidoptera
- Family: Xyloryctidae
- Genus: Xylorycta
- Species: X. synaula

Binomial name
- Xylorycta synaula Meyrick, 1890

Species of moth

Xylorycta synaula is a moth in the family Xyloryctidae. It was described by Edward Meyrick in 1890. It is found in Australia, where it has been recorded from South Australia and Western Australia.

The wingspan is 26–30 mm. The forewings are silvery white with the costal edge very slenderly black towards the base, yellowish ochreous beyond the middle. The markings are ochreous brown with a moderate almost straight streak above the middle from the base to the apex and a similar slightly sinuate streak from the base to the anal angle, as well as a slender streak along the inner margin from before the middle to the anal angle. The hindwings are light grey, more whitish tinged towards the base.

The larvae feed on Hakea species. They feed from within a tube of silk and frass in the leaves.
