= Xylorycta emarginata =

Scientific classification
- Domain: Eukaryota
- Kingdom: Animalia
- Phylum: Arthropoda
- Class: Insecta
- Order: Lepidoptera
- Family: Xyloryctidae
- Genus: Xylorycta
- Species: X. emarginata

Binomial name
- Xylorycta emarginata (T. P. Lucas, 1900)

Synonyms
- Catoryctis emarginata T. P. Lucas, 1900

Species of moth

Xylorycta emarginata is a moth in the family Xyloryctidae. It was described by Thomas Pennington Lucas in 1900. It is found in Australia, where it has been recorded from Queensland.

The wingspan is about 14 mm. There is a broad white band on the costal border of the forewings, from the base to and attenuating towards two-thirds of the costa. A second white band commences just below, opposite the apical end of the first runs to the apex and there is a broad fuscous band that separates and encloses these two white bands on the inner border. There is also a small triangular fuscous blotch in the disc, and two linear spots opposite the ends of these white bands. There is also a pale suffusion along the disc, and a conspicuous fuscous blotch before the anal angle, as well as a suffusion of fuscous along the inner margin and an oblique hindmarginal line of the same colour bordered on either side with white lines. The hindwings are pale fuscous drab.
