= Xylorycta corticana =

Scientific classification
- Kingdom: Animalia
- Phylum: Arthropoda
- Clade: Pancrustacea
- Class: Insecta
- Order: Lepidoptera
- Family: Xyloryctidae
- Genus: Xylorycta
- Species: X. corticana

Binomial name
- Xylorycta corticana (T. P. Lucas, 1901)

Synonyms
- Xyloricta corticana T. P. Lucas, 1901

Species of moth

Xylorycta corticana is a moth in the family Xyloryctidae. It was described by Thomas Pennington Lucas in 1901. It is found in Australia, where it has been recorded from Queensland.

The wingspan is 24–28 mm. The forewings are silvery white, the ground colour almost lost in a covering of grey scales. The veins are shaded fuscous grey, with a white discal spot at two-thirds, followed posteriorly by a small fuscous ring. There is a diffusion of scattered light fuscous scales through the centre of the wing and along the fold, most freely toward the apex. The hindwings are as the forewings.
