= Xylorycta chionoptera =

Scientific classification
- Domain: Eukaryota
- Kingdom: Animalia
- Phylum: Arthropoda
- Class: Insecta
- Order: Lepidoptera
- Family: Xyloryctidae
- Genus: Xylorycta
- Species: X. chionoptera

Binomial name
- Xylorycta chionoptera Lower, 1893

Species of moth

Xylorycta chionoptera is a moth in the family Xyloryctidae. It was described by Oswald Bertram Lower in 1893. It is found in Australia, where it has been recorded from Victoria.

The wingspan is about 36 mm. The forewings are shining snow white with the costal edge blackish from the base to one-fourth, the rest of the costa orange. The hindwings are light fuscous grey.
