= Xylorycta bipunctella =

Scientific classification
- Kingdom: Animalia
- Phylum: Arthropoda
- Class: Insecta
- Order: Lepidoptera
- Family: Xyloryctidae
- Genus: Xylorycta
- Species: X. bipunctella

Binomial name
- Xylorycta bipunctella (Walker, 1864)

Synonyms
- Cryptolechia bipunctella Walker, 1864

Species of moth

Xylorycta bipunctella is a moth in the family Xyloryctidae. It was described by Francis Walker in 1864. It is found in Australia.

The wingspan is 24–25 mm. The forewings are ochreous white, with the costa more ochreous tinged and the costal edge dark fuscous towards the base. There are two moderate roundish dark-grey dots transversely placed in the disc at two-thirds. The hindwings are ochreous whitish, slightly greyish tinged.
