= Xylorycta ceratospila =

Scientific classification
- Kingdom: Animalia
- Phylum: Arthropoda
- Class: Insecta
- Order: Lepidoptera
- Family: Xyloryctidae
- Genus: Xylorycta
- Species: X. ceratospila

Binomial name
- Xylorycta ceratospila Meyrick, 1915

Species of moth

Xylorycta ceratospila is a moth in the family Xyloryctidae. It was described by Edward Meyrick in 1915. It is found in Australia, where it has been recorded from Queensland.

The wingspan is about 14 mm. The forewings are white with rather dark fuscous markings. There is a blotch occupying the basal half of the dorsum and reaching halfway across the wing, with a long wedge-shaped posterior projection reaching in the disc to three-fifths. A smaller semicircular blotch extends on the dorsum from near beyond this to the tornus, connected with it on the dorsum and there is a very oblique straight streak from the costa beyond the middle to the termen beneath the apex, as well as a browner streak along the apical fourth of the costa. The hindwings are grey.
