= Xylorycta parthenistis =

Scientific classification
- Domain: Eukaryota
- Kingdom: Animalia
- Phylum: Arthropoda
- Class: Insecta
- Order: Lepidoptera
- Family: Xyloryctidae
- Genus: Xylorycta
- Species: X. parthenistis

Binomial name
- Xylorycta parthenistis Lower, 1902

Species of moth

Xylorycta parthenistis is a moth in the family Xyloryctidae. It was described by Oswald Bertram Lower in 1902. It is found in Australia, where it has been recorded from the Northern Territory.

The wingspan is about 32 mm. The forewings are shining snow white with a fine pale ochreous line along the costa from the base to the apex, somewhat dilated posteriorly. The hindwings are shining snow white.
