= Xylorycta ovata =

Scientific classification
- Domain: Eukaryota
- Kingdom: Animalia
- Phylum: Arthropoda
- Class: Insecta
- Order: Lepidoptera
- Family: Xyloryctidae
- Genus: Xylorycta
- Species: X. ovata

Binomial name
- Xylorycta ovata (Walsingham, 1881)

Synonyms
- Antaeotricha ovata Walsingham, 1881

Species of moth

Xylorycta ovata is a moth in the family Xyloryctidae. It was described by Thomas de Grey, 6th Baron Walsingham, in 1881. It is found in South Africa (including Gauteng).

The wingspan is about 25 mm. The forewings are pale testaceous-grey, rather shining. There is a single fuscous spot at the end of the cell, beyond which the veins are traceable to the apical margin. The hindwings are rather broader than the forewings, slightly paler greyish cinereous.
