= Xylorycta chrysomela =

Scientific classification
- Domain: Eukaryota
- Kingdom: Animalia
- Phylum: Arthropoda
- Class: Insecta
- Order: Lepidoptera
- Family: Xyloryctidae
- Genus: Xylorycta
- Species: X. chrysomela

Binomial name
- Xylorycta chrysomela Lower, 1897

Species of moth

Xylorycta chrysomela is a species of moth in the family Xyloryctidae. It was described by Oswald Bertram Lower in 1897. It is found in Australia, where it has been recorded from the Northern Territory and Queensland.

== Description ==
X. chrysomela's wingspan is approximately 32 mm. The forewings are whitish ochreous, with dark fuscous markings. There is a broad oblique fascia close to the base, dilated on the inner margin. A moderately-sized triangular spot is found on the costa, and just beyond and there is a second moderate, somewhat irregularly-edged fascia from about the middle of the costa to the middle of the inner margin, broadly dilated beneath, the costal portion of which is connected with a triangular spot by a thick streak which continues along the costa to three-fourths of the length, and encloses one or two small spots of ground colour on the costa. There is a third moderately thick curved fascia from the posterior edge of this streak, ending just above the inner margin on the posterior edge of the previous fascia, as well as a thick streak from the middle of the posterior edge of the third fascia to just below the apex, then continued as a thick streak along the hindmargin to the anal angle. There is also a small spot on the costa at four-fifths and a triangular spot of fuscous in the cilia at the apex, containing two sharp black lines at the base. The hindwings are orange, with an irregular fuscous band from just below the costa at three-fourths to the anal angle, contracted posteriorly.
