= Xylorycta austera =

Scientific classification
- Kingdom: Animalia
- Phylum: Arthropoda
- Class: Insecta
- Order: Lepidoptera
- Family: Xyloryctidae
- Genus: Xylorycta
- Species: X. austera

Binomial name
- Xylorycta austera (T. P. Lucas, 1898)

Synonyms
- Xyloricta austera T. P. Lucas, 1898

Species of moth

Xylorycta austera is a moth in the family Xyloryctidae. It was described by Thomas Pennington Lucas in 1898. It is found in Australia, where it has been recorded from New South Wales and Queensland.

The wingspan is 24–35 mm. The forewings are cream colour, with chocolate-fuscous longitudinal bifurcating bands, the first along the costa, the second from the centre of the base of the wing, bifurcating at one-sixth, the inner branch to the anal angle of the hindmargin, the other toward the costa. This again bifurcates beyond the middle of the wing, the one branch to the costa before and along the apex, the other to the hindmargin before the middle. The third has the form of a border band from near the base along the inner margin, thinning out to the anal angle. There is a discoidal spot at two-thirds, touching the band to the hindmargin. There is also a row of fine lines beyond and below this to the hindmargin.
