= Xylorycta orectis =

Scientific classification
- Kingdom: Animalia
- Phylum: Arthropoda
- Class: Insecta
- Order: Lepidoptera
- Family: Xyloryctidae
- Genus: Xylorycta
- Species: X. orectis

Binomial name
- Xylorycta orectis Meyrick, 1890

Species of moth

Xylorycta orectis is a moth in the family Xyloryctidae. It was described by Edward Meyrick in 1890. It is found in Australia, where it has been recorded from New South Wales, the Northern Territory, Queensland and Western Australia.

The wingspan is about 34 mm. The forewings are snow white with the extreme costal edge ochreous tinged. The hindwings are pale grey, becoming white towards the base. The apex and upper part of the hindmargin are irregularly white.
