= Xylorycta nivella =

Scientific classification
- Kingdom: Animalia
- Phylum: Arthropoda
- Class: Insecta
- Order: Lepidoptera
- Family: Xyloryctidae
- Genus: Xylorycta
- Species: X. nivella

Binomial name
- Xylorycta nivella (Walker, 1864)

Synonyms
- Cryptolechia nivella Walker, 1864

Species of moth

Xylorycta nivella is a moth in the family Xyloryctidae. It was described by Francis Walker in 1864. It is found in Australia.

The wingspan is about 25 mm. Adults are pure white, with the forewings slightly rounded at the tips, the exterior border slightly convex and very oblique.
