= Xylorycta atelactis =

Scientific classification
- Domain: Eukaryota
- Kingdom: Animalia
- Phylum: Arthropoda
- Class: Insecta
- Order: Lepidoptera
- Family: Xyloryctidae
- Genus: Xylorycta
- Species: X. atelactis

Binomial name
- Xylorycta atelactis Meyrick, 1918

Species of moth

Xylorycta atelactis is a moth in the family Xyloryctidae. It was described by Edward Meyrick in 1918. It is found on New Guinea.

The wingspan is about 33 mm. The forewings are shining white, with scattered dark fuscous scales and with the costal edge dark fuscous towards the base. There are irregular dark fuscous streaks along the anterior half of the upper margin of the cell, and the posterior half of the lower margin, as well as irregular lines of dark fuscous suffusion along all veins rising from the cell, but not continued to the margin. There is an irregular elongate dark fuscous patch extending along the dorsum from one-fifth to near the tornus, connected in the middle with the anterior extremity of the streak on the lower margin of the cell. There are also some dark fuscous scales on the costa towards the apex. The hindwings are ochreous whitish.
