= Xylorycta polysticha =

Scientific classification
- Domain: Eukaryota
- Kingdom: Animalia
- Phylum: Arthropoda
- Class: Insecta
- Order: Lepidoptera
- Family: Xyloryctidae
- Genus: Xylorycta
- Species: X. polysticha

Binomial name
- Xylorycta polysticha Turner, 1939

Species of moth

Xylorycta polysticha is a moth in the family Xyloryctidae. It was described by Alfred Jefferis Turner in 1939. It is found in Australia, where it has been recorded from Tasmania.
