= Xylorycta micracma =

Scientific classification
- Kingdom: Animalia
- Phylum: Arthropoda
- Class: Insecta
- Order: Lepidoptera
- Family: Xyloryctidae
- Genus: Xylorycta
- Species: X. micracma

Binomial name
- Xylorycta micracma (Meyrick, 1890)

Synonyms
- Telecrates micracma Meyrick, 1890

Species of moth

Xylorycta micracma is a moth in the family Xyloryctidae. It was described by Edward Meyrick in 1890. It is found in Australia, where it has been recorded from New South Wales, Queensland and Tasmania.

The wingspan is 17–18 mm. The forewings are silvery white with the costal edge finely dark fuscous towards the base. The hindwings are grey.
