= Xylorycta homoleuca =

Scientific classification
- Domain: Eukaryota
- Kingdom: Animalia
- Phylum: Arthropoda
- Class: Insecta
- Order: Lepidoptera
- Family: Xyloryctidae
- Genus: Xylorycta
- Species: X. homoleuca

Binomial name
- Xylorycta homoleuca Lower, 1894

Species of moth

Xylorycta homoleuca is a moth in the family Xyloryctidae. It was described by Oswald Bertram Lower in 1894. It is found in Australia, where it has been recorded from Queensland.

The wingspan is about 31 mm. The forewings are shining white, faintly ochreous-tinged, without markings. The hindwings are pale grey.

The larvae feed on Cupaniopsis and possibly Hakea species. They feed under a web in the bark.
