= Xylorycta molybdina =

Scientific classification
- Domain: Eukaryota
- Kingdom: Animalia
- Phylum: Arthropoda
- Class: Insecta
- Order: Lepidoptera
- Family: Xyloryctidae
- Genus: Xylorycta
- Species: X. molybdina

Binomial name
- Xylorycta molybdina Turner, 1898

Species of moth

Xylorycta molybdina is a moth in the family Xyloryctidae. It was described by Alfred Jefferis Turner in 1898. It is found in Australia, where it has been recorded from Queensland.

The wingspan is 22–29 mm. The forewings are pale slate-colour with a white streak along the costal edge not reaching the apex. The hindwings are grey, paler towards the base.

The larvae feed on Melaleuca leucadendra. They bore in the stem of their host plant.
