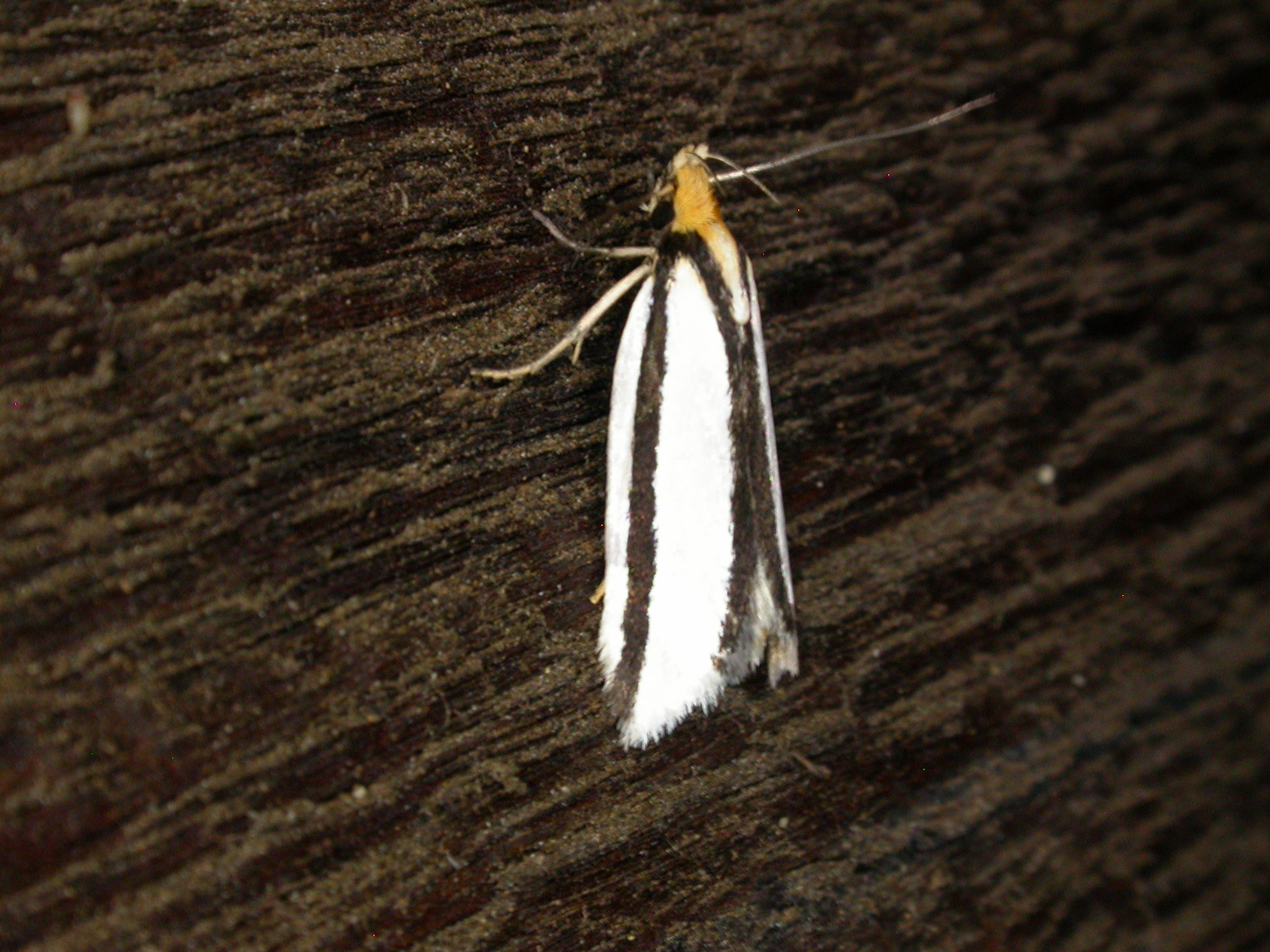
- Xylorycta stereodesma

Scientific classification
- Kingdom: Animalia
- Phylum: Arthropoda
- Class: Insecta
- Order: Lepidoptera
- Family: Xyloryctidae
- Genus: Xylorycta; Meyrick, 1890

Species
- About 60 species; see text for details.

Synonyms
- Neodrepta Turner, 1898

= Xylorycta =

Moth genus in family Xyloryctidae

Xylorycta is a genus of moths of the family Xyloryctidae. Xylorycta species are found in Africa and Australia and are strongly associated with the plant family Proteaceae, being found on Hakea, Lambertia, Grevillea, Leptospermum, Macadamia, Oreocallis, Persoonia and Telopea. The larvae of some species bore into stems or branches, or the flower spikes of Banksia, but most live in a silk gallery spun in the foliage.

The genus was first published by amateur entomologist Edward Meyrick in 1890 in Transactions of the Royal Society of South Australia. It is currently placed in the family Xyloryctidae. In older classifications it was placed in the subfamily Xyloryctinae, in the family Oecophoridae.

== Species ==
- X. amaloptis Lower, 1915
- X. amblygona (Turner, 1900)
- X. amphileuca Lower, 1902
- X. apheles (Turner, 1898)
- X. argentella (Walker, 1864)
- X. argyrota Lower, 1908
- X. assimilis Turner, 1900
- X. atelactis Meyrick, 1918
- X. austera (Lucas, 1898)
- X. bipunctella (Walker, 1864)
- X. calligramma (Meyrick, 1890)
- X. candescens Lower, 1896
- X. castanea (Turner, 1902)
- X. ceratospila Meyrick, 1915
- X. chionoptera Lower, 1893
- X. chrysomela Lower, 1897
- X. cirrhophragma Meyrick, 1921
- X. conistica Turner, 1917
- X. corticana (Lucas, 1901)
- X. cosmeta Turner, 1917
- X. cosmopis Meyrick, 1890
- X. cygnella (Walker, 1864)
- X. emarginata (Lucas, 1900)
- X. flavicosta (Lucas, 1894)
- X. haplochroa (Turner, 1898)
- X. heliomacula (Lower, 1894)
- X. homoleuca Lower, 1894
- X. hypatolimnas Diakonoff, 1954
- X. leucophanes Lower, 1892
- X. luteotactella (Walker, 1864)
- X. maeandria Meyrick, 1915
- X. malgassella Viette, 1956
- X. melameucae Turner, 1898
- X. melanias Lower, 1899
- X. melanula (Meyrick, 1890)
- X. micracma (Meyrick, 1890)
- X. moligera (Meyrick, 1914)
- X. molybdina Turner, 1898
- X. nivella (Walker, 1864)
- X. ophiogramma Meyrick, 1890
- X. orectis Meyrick, 1890
- X. ovata (Walsingham, 1881)
- X. parabolella (Walker, 1864)
- X. parthenistis Lower, 1902
- X. perflua Meyrick, 1914
- X. philonympha Lower, 1903
- X. placidella (Walker, 1864)
- X. polysticha Turner, 1939
- X. sigmophora Lower, 1894
- X. stereodesma Lower, 1902
- X. streptogramma (Lower, 1903)
- X. strigata (Lewin, 1805)
- X. sucina Turner, 1939
- X. synaula Meyrick, 1890
- X. tapeina Turner, 1898
- X. tignaria Meyrick, 1921
- X. viduata (Walker, 1869)

== Former species ==
- X. artigena Meyrick, 1914
