= Xylorycta cosmopis =

Scientific classification
- Kingdom: Animalia
- Phylum: Arthropoda
- Class: Insecta
- Order: Lepidoptera
- Family: Xyloryctidae
- Genus: Xylorycta
- Species: X. cosmopis

Binomial name
- Xylorycta cosmopis Meyrick, 1890

Species of moth

Xylorycta cosmopis is a moth in the family Xyloryctidae. It was described by Edward Meyrick in 1890. It is found in Australia, where it has been recorded from Western Australia.

The wingspan is 22–24 mm. The forewings are shining snow white with the costa slenderly ochreous tinged, the costal edge very slenderly blackish on the basal fourth. The hindwings are grey whitish, the apex somewhat greyer.

The larvae feed on Jacksonia furcellata.
