= Xylorycta placidella =

Scientific classification
- Kingdom: Animalia
- Phylum: Arthropoda
- Class: Insecta
- Order: Lepidoptera
- Family: Xyloryctidae
- Genus: Xylorycta
- Species: X. placidella

Binomial name
- Xylorycta placidella (Walker, 1864)

Synonyms
- Cryptolechia placidella Walker, 1864

Species of moth

Xylorycta placidella is a moth in the family Xyloryctidae. It was described by Francis Walker in 1864. It is found in Australia, where it has been recorded from New South Wales, Queensland and Victoria.

The wingspan is 19–20 mm. The forewings are shining white with the costal edge whitish ochreous, the extreme edge dark fuscous towards the base. The hindwings are pale whitish ochreous, the posterior half, except the margin, suffused with light grey.
