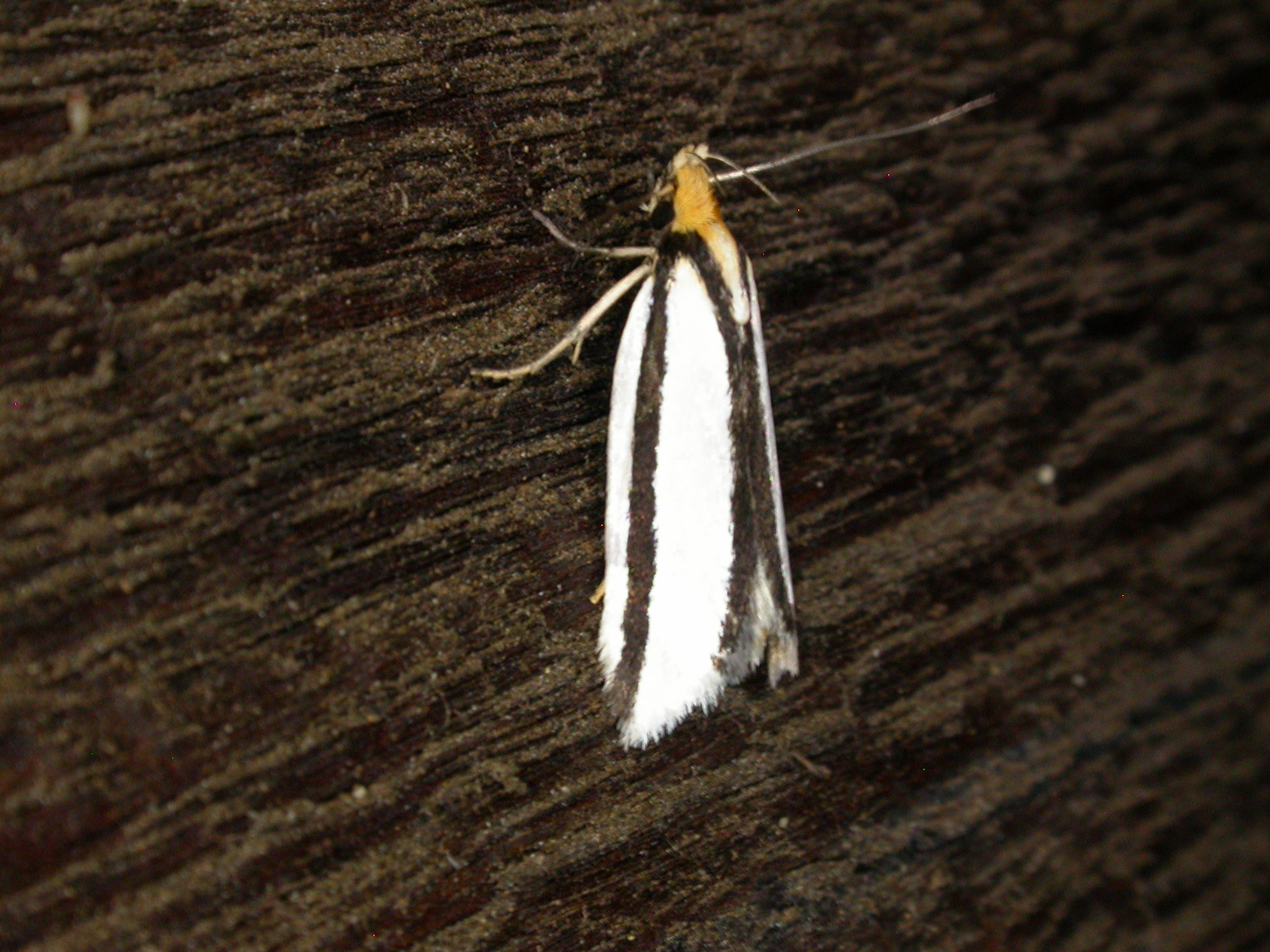

Scientific classification
- Domain: Eukaryota
- Kingdom: Animalia
- Phylum: Arthropoda
- Class: Insecta
- Order: Lepidoptera
- Family: Xyloryctidae
- Genus: Xylorycta
- Species: X. stereodesma

Binomial name
- Xylorycta stereodesma Lower, 1902

Synonyms
- Xylorycta prospicua Meyrick, 1914

= Xylorycta stereodesma =

Species of moth

Xylorycta stereodesma is a moth of the family Xyloryctidae. It is found in Australia, where it has been recorded from Western Australia.

The wingspan is about 27 mm for males and 30 mm for females. The forewings are silvery-white with two moderately thick longitudinal black streaks, the first from the middle of the base to the apex and the second along the inner margin from near the base to the anal angle. The hindwings are fuscous, becoming ochreous at the base.
