= Xylorycta tignaria =

Scientific classification
- Kingdom: Animalia
- Phylum: Arthropoda
- Class: Insecta
- Order: Lepidoptera
- Family: Xyloryctidae
- Genus: Xylorycta
- Species: X. tignaria

Binomial name
- Xylorycta tignaria Meyrick, 1921

Species of moth

Xylorycta tignaria is a moth in the family Xyloryctidae. It was described by Edward Meyrick in 1921. It is found in Australia, where it has been recorded from Queensland.

The wingspan is about 19 mm. The forewings are ochreous whitish with dark brown markings. There is a moderate basal fascia, extended as a wedge-shaped streak along the costa nearly to the middle and a moderate fascia from the costa beyond the middle to the middle of the dorsum, with a branch from its middle running to the tornus, and continued as a narrower terminal fascia to the apex. The hindwings are pale ochreous yellowish, the posterior half suffused with grey.
