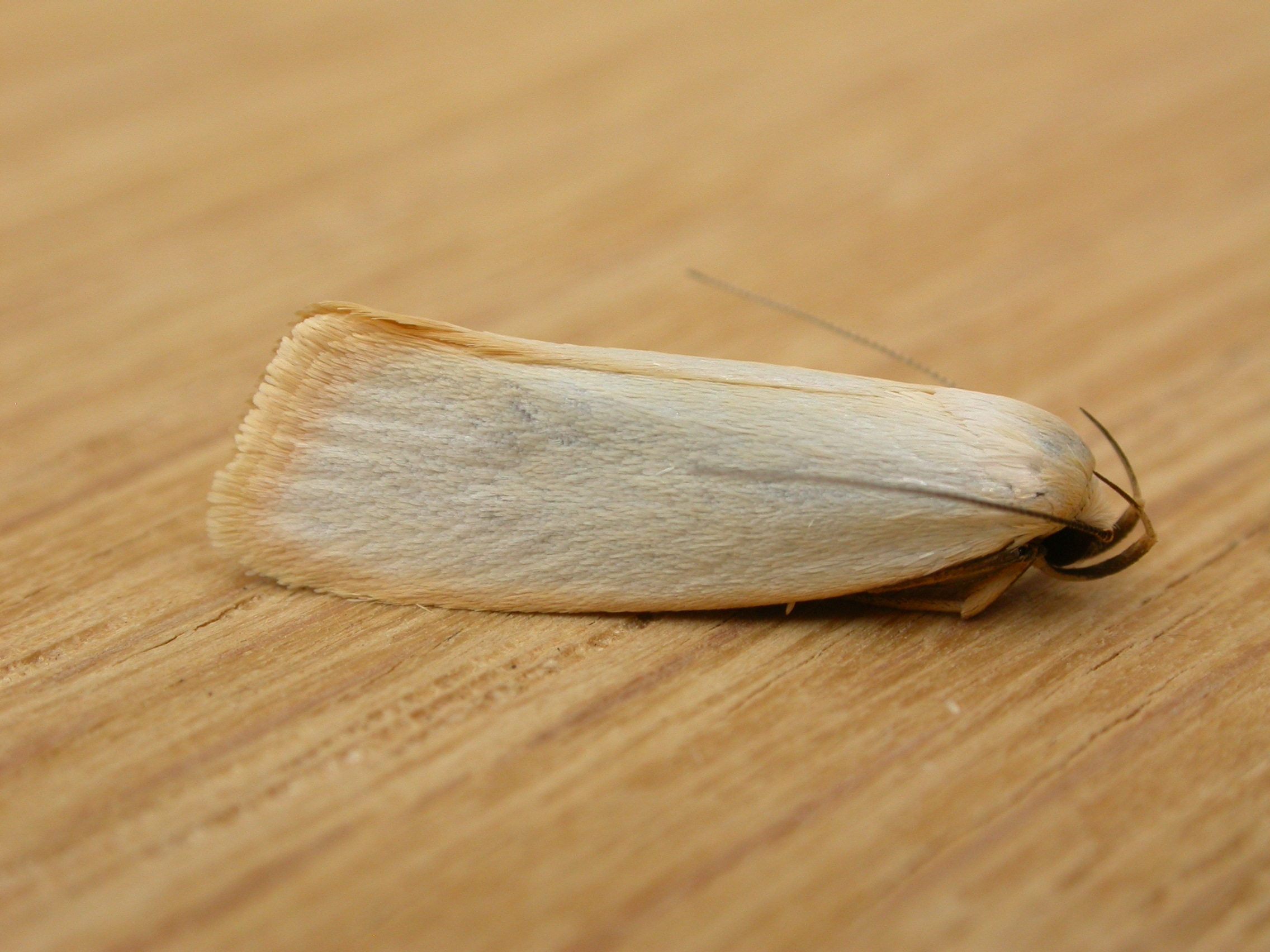

Scientific classification
- Kingdom: Animalia
- Phylum: Arthropoda
- Clade: Pancrustacea
- Class: Insecta
- Order: Lepidoptera
- Family: Xyloryctidae
- Genus: Xylorycta
- Species: X. assimilis

Binomial name
- Xylorycta assimilis Turner, 1900

Synonyms
- Xylorycta terenopis Meyrick, 1915

= Xylorycta assimilis =

Species of moth

Xylorycta assimilis is a moth of the family Xyloryctidae. It is found in Australia, where it has been recorded from New South Wales, Queensland and Victoria.

The wingspan is 26–28 mm. The forewings are snow-white with the costal edge pale-ochreous throughout. There is a faint ochreous suffusion at the anal angle. The hindwings are whitish-ochreous with the apical portion of the disc greyish-tinged.
