= Xylorycta tapeina =

Scientific classification
- Domain: Eukaryota
- Kingdom: Animalia
- Phylum: Arthropoda
- Class: Insecta
- Order: Lepidoptera
- Family: Xyloryctidae
- Genus: Xylorycta
- Species: X. tapeina

Binomial name
- Xylorycta tapeina Turner, 1898

Species of moth

Xylorycta tapeina is a moth in the family Xyloryctidae. It was described by Alfred Jefferis Turner in 1898. It is found in Australia, where it has been recorded from Queensland.

The wingspan is about 24 mm. The forewings are fuscous irrorated with white scales and with a broad white streak along the whole of the costa, narrowing to a point at the base and apex. There is an obscure whitish spot above the middle of the inner margin and a dark spot in the disc at two-thirds. The hindwings are pale grey.
