= Xylorycta amphileuca =

Scientific classification
- Domain: Eukaryota
- Kingdom: Animalia
- Phylum: Arthropoda
- Class: Insecta
- Order: Lepidoptera
- Family: Xyloryctidae
- Genus: Xylorycta
- Species: X. amphileuca

Binomial name
- Xylorycta amphileuca Lower, 1902

Species of moth

Xylorycta amphileuca is a moth in the family Xyloryctidae. It was described by Oswald Bertram Lower in 1902. It is found in Australia, where it has been recorded from the Northern Territory and Western Australia.

The wingspan is about 30 mm. The forewings are shining snow white with a fine fuscous streak along the costa from the base to the middle, then continued to the apex as an obscure ochreous-fuscous streak. The hindwings are greyish fuscous.
