= Xylorycta melanias =

Scientific classification
- Domain: Eukaryota
- Kingdom: Animalia
- Phylum: Arthropoda
- Class: Insecta
- Order: Lepidoptera
- Family: Xyloryctidae
- Genus: Xylorycta
- Species: X. melanias

Binomial name
- Xylorycta melanias Lower, 1899

Species of moth

Xylorycta melanias is a moth in the family Xyloryctidae. It was described by Oswald Bertram Lower in 1899. It is found in Australia, where it has been recorded from New South Wales.

The wingspan is 16–20 mm. The forewings are snow white, finely irrorated (sprinkled) throughout with blackish and with very obscure markings. There is a short black dash from near the base in the middle and a small black mark on the costa, close to the base, as well as a suffused blackish mark on the fold before the middle and a small black spot at the end of the cell. An irregular row of black spots is found along the hindmargin. The hindwings are pale fuscous whitish, darker around the margins.
