= Xylorycta argentella =

Scientific classification
- Kingdom: Animalia
- Phylum: Arthropoda
- Class: Insecta
- Order: Lepidoptera
- Family: Xyloryctidae
- Genus: Xylorycta
- Species: X. argentella

Binomial name
- Xylorycta argentella (Walker, 1864)

Synonyms
- Cryptolechia argentella Walker, 1864

Species of moth

Xylorycta argentella is a moth in the family Xyloryctidae. It was described by Francis Walker in 1864. It is found in Australia, where it has been recorded from New South Wales.

The wingspan is 18–30 mm. The forewings are shining white, faintly ochreous tinged, with more distinction on the costal edge. The costal edge is very slenderly black on the basal fourth. The hindwings are light grey, becoming ochreous whitish towards the inner margin.
