= Xylorycta viduata =

Scientific classification
- Kingdom: Animalia
- Phylum: Arthropoda
- Class: Insecta
- Order: Lepidoptera
- Family: Xyloryctidae
- Genus: Xylorycta
- Species: X. viduata

Binomial name
- Xylorycta viduata (Walker, 1869)

Synonyms
- Hyponomeuta viduata Walker, 1869

Species of moth

Xylorycta viduata is a moth in the family Xyloryctidae. It was described by Francis Walker in 1869. It is found in Australia, where it has been recorded from the Australian Capital Territory and Victoria.

The wingspan is about 36 mm. Adults are shining slaty cinereous, the forewings with a narrow black subcostal stripe, which extends from the base to rather beyond half the length and with a black point beyond half the length of the stripe and nearer to the interior border than to the costa. There are two elongate black dots on the disc a little beyond the end of the stripe, one behind the other. The exterior border is rounded and extremely oblique.
