= Xylorycta perflua =

Scientific classification
- Kingdom: Animalia
- Phylum: Arthropoda
- Class: Insecta
- Order: Lepidoptera
- Family: Xyloryctidae
- Genus: Xylorycta
- Species: X. perflua

Binomial name
- Xylorycta perflua Meyrick, 1914

Species of moth

Xylorycta perflua is a moth in the family Xyloryctidae. It was described by Edward Meyrick in 1914. It is found in Australia, where it has been recorded from Western Australia.

The wingspan is about 30 mm. The forewings are ochreous white with a narrow dark fuscous costal streak from the base to near the apex, finely attenuated anteriorly. There is a moderate dark fuscous streak along the dorsum from one-fourth to the tornus, narrowed towards the extremities. The hindwings are whitish ochreous, posteriorly infuscated.
