= Xylorycta streptogramma =

Scientific classification
- Domain: Eukaryota
- Kingdom: Animalia
- Phylum: Arthropoda
- Class: Insecta
- Order: Lepidoptera
- Family: Xyloryctidae
- Genus: Xylorycta
- Species: X. streptogramma

Binomial name
- Xylorycta streptogramma (Lower, 1903)

Synonyms
- Telecrates streptogramma Lower, 1903

Species of moth

Xylorycta streptogramma is a moth in the family Xyloryctidae. It was described by Oswald Bertram Lower in 1903. It is found in Australia, where it has been recorded from New South Wales and Victoria.

The wingspan is about 20 mm. The forewings are shining pale yellow, with blackish markings. The costal edge is narrowly blackish throughout and indistinct towards the apex. There is a moderately broad subcostal streak from the base to the apex, emitting from its upper extremity at two-thirds fine lines along the veins to the termination. There is an inwardly oblique somewhat triangular spot on the dorsum at the anal angle and all veins between this and the termen are outlined with blackish. There is also a fine line along the termen. The hindwings are dark fuscous, becoming much paler on the basal one-half.
