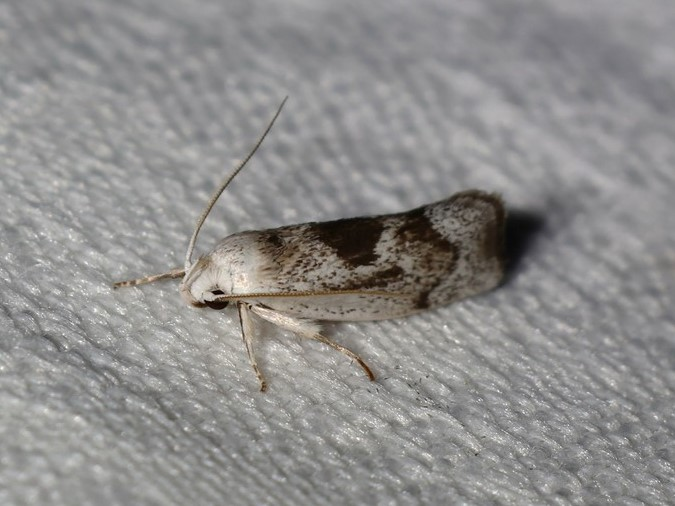

Scientific classification
- Domain: Eukaryota
- Kingdom: Animalia
- Phylum: Arthropoda
- Class: Insecta
- Order: Lepidoptera
- Family: Xyloryctidae
- Genus: Xylorycta
- Species: X. amblygona

Binomial name
- Xylorycta amblygona (Turner, 1900)

Synonyms
- Lichenaula amblygona Turner, 1900

= Xylorycta amblygona =

Species of moth

Xylorycta amblygona is a species of moth in the family Xyloryctidae. It was described by Alfred Jefferis Turner in 1900. It is found in Australia, where it has been recorded from New South Wales and Queensland.

The wingspan is about 28 mm. The forewings are white rather densely irrorated with fuscous and with a triangular fuscous suffusion on the inner margin before the middle. There is a short longitudinal suffused mark in the disc before the middle and a very distinct outwardly oblique line from the costa at two-thirds, angulated in the disc, and continued parallel to the hindmargin to the inner margin at three-fifths. There is also an indistinct suffusion on the middle of the hind margin. The hindwings are pale-grey, whitish toward the base.
