= Xylorycta amaloptis =

Scientific classification
- Domain: Eukaryota
- Kingdom: Animalia
- Phylum: Arthropoda
- Class: Insecta
- Order: Lepidoptera
- Family: Xyloryctidae
- Genus: Xylorycta
- Species: X. amaloptis

Binomial name
- Xylorycta amaloptis Lower, 1915

Species of moth

Xylorycta amaloptis is a moth in the family Xyloryctidae. It was described by Oswald Bertram Lower in 1915. It is found in Australia, where it has been recorded from New South Wales.

The wingspan is about 28 mm. The forewings are pale whitish grey, somewhat tannish peach tinged, all markings obsolete. There is a fuscous-ferruginous line along the termen and the apical fifth of the costa, obscure on the costa and minutely dentate internally on the termen. The hindwings are light fuscous, becoming whitish towards the base.
