= Xylorycta malgassella =

Scientific classification
- Kingdom: Animalia
- Phylum: Arthropoda
- Class: Insecta
- Order: Lepidoptera
- Family: Xyloryctidae
- Genus: Xylorycta
- Species: X. malgassella

Binomial name
- Xylorycta malgassella Viette, 1956

Species of moth

Xylorycta malgassella is a moth in the family Xyloryctidae. It was described by Viette in 1956. It is found in Madagascar.
