= Xylorycta cosmeta =

Scientific classification
- Kingdom: Animalia
- Phylum: Arthropoda
- Class: Insecta
- Order: Lepidoptera
- Family: Xyloryctidae
- Genus: Xylorycta
- Species: X. cosmeta

Binomial name
- Xylorycta cosmeta Turner, 1917

Species of moth

Xylorycta cosmeta is a moth in the family Xyloryctidae. It was described by Alfred Jefferis Turner in 1917. It is found in Australia, where it has been recorded from Queensland.

The wingspan is 22–26 mm. The forewings are white with a few fuscous-grey scales and fuscous markings. There is a semicircular blotch on the dorsum before the middle not reaching the middle of the disc and a line from two-thirds of the costa to three-fourths of the dorsum, strongly angulated outwards in the middle, dilated on both margins. The hindwings are whitish.
