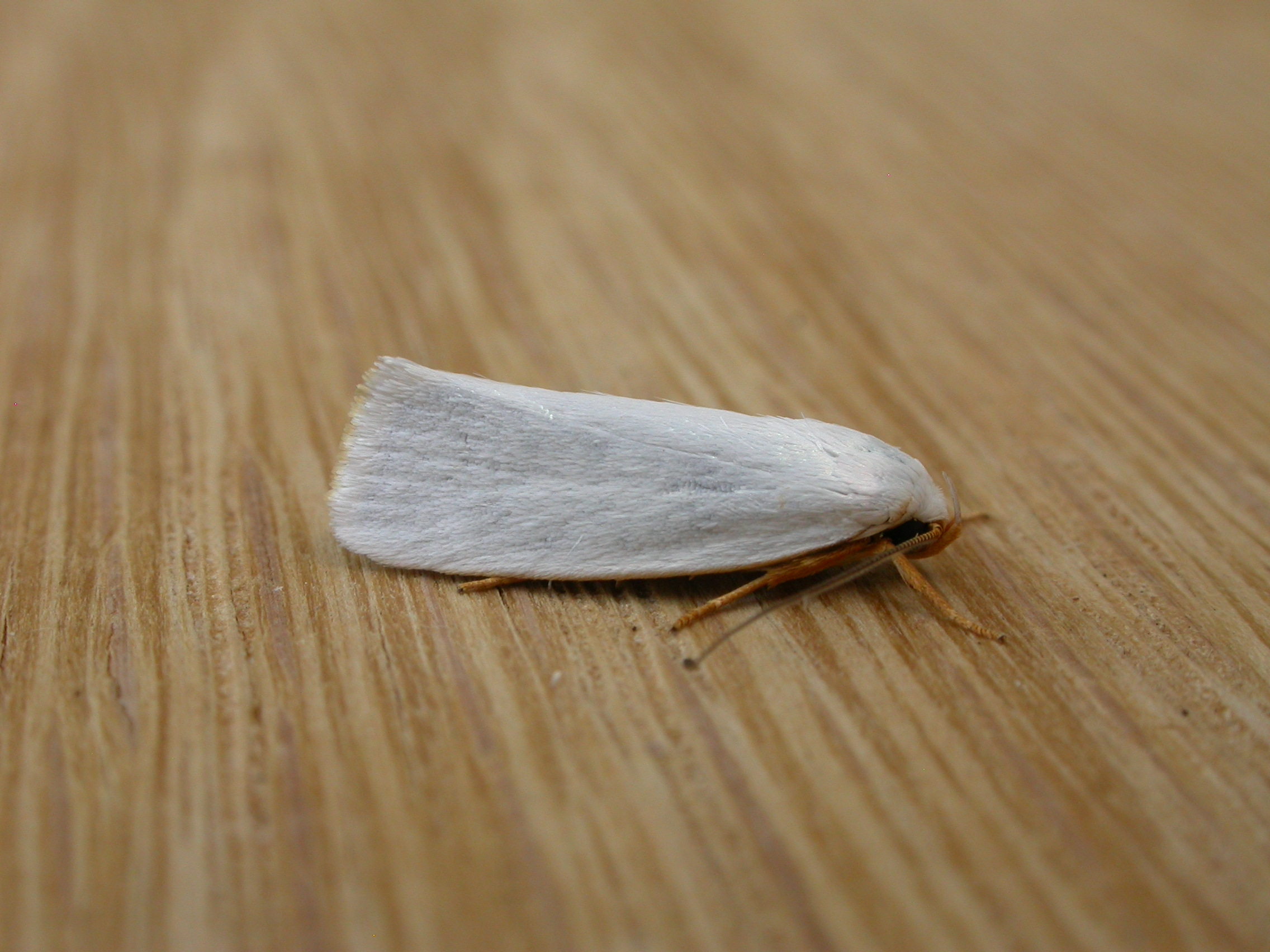

Scientific classification
- Kingdom: Animalia
- Phylum: Arthropoda
- Class: Insecta
- Order: Lepidoptera
- Family: Xyloryctidae
- Genus: Xylorycta
- Species: X. luteotactella

Binomial name
- Xylorycta luteotactella (Walker, 1864)

Synonyms
- Cryptolechia luteotactella Walker, 1864; Cryptolechia cognatella Walker, 1864

= Xylorycta luteotactella =

Species of moth

Xylorycta luteotactella, commonly known as the macadamia twig girdler, is a moth of the family Xyloryctidae. It is found in Australia. The caterpillars cause economic damage to waratah and macadamia crops, the former by disfiguring the developing flowerheads.
