= Xylorycta moligera =

Scientific classification
- Kingdom: Animalia
- Phylum: Arthropoda
- Class: Insecta
- Order: Lepidoptera
- Family: Xyloryctidae
- Genus: Xylorycta
- Species: X. moligera

Binomial name
- Xylorycta moligera (Meyrick, 1914)

Synonyms
- Paralecta moligera Meyrick, 1914

Species of moth

Xylorycta moligera is a moth in the family Xyloryctidae. It was described by Edward Meyrick in 1914. It is found in Australia, where it has been recorded from Queensland.

The wingspan is about 25 mm for males and 30 mm for females. The forewings are brownish ochreous, lighter anteriorly, with some scattered dark fuscous specks and with the costal edge dark fuscous anteriorly. There is a dark fuscous streak running from the middle of the disc to the dorsum before the tornus. The hindwings are whitish ochreous.
