= Xylorycta melaleucae =

Scientific classification
- Domain: Eukaryota
- Kingdom: Animalia
- Phylum: Arthropoda
- Class: Insecta
- Order: Lepidoptera
- Family: Xyloryctidae
- Genus: Xylorycta
- Species: X. melaleucae

Binomial name
- Xylorycta melaleucae Turner, 1898

Species of moth

Xylorycta melaleucae is a moth in the family Xyloryctidae. It was described by Alfred Jefferis Turner in 1898. It is found in Australia, where it has been recorded from New South Wales and Queensland.

The wingspan is 17–18 mm. The forewings are fuscous-grey, irrorated with dark fuscous scales and with a broad snow-white streak along the costa near the base, ceasing rather abruptly beyond the middle. There is some dark suffusion in the basal part of the disc, and two fuscous dots placed transversely in the disc at two-thirds. The hindmarginal edge is barred with fuscous and whitish. The hindwings are pale grey.

The larvae feed on Melaleuca genistifolia. They bore in the stem of their host plant.
