= Xylorycta calligramma =

Scientific classification
- Kingdom: Animalia
- Phylum: Arthropoda
- Class: Insecta
- Order: Lepidoptera
- Family: Xyloryctidae
- Genus: Xylorycta
- Species: X. calligramma

Binomial name
- Xylorycta calligramma (Meyrick, 1890)

Synonyms
- Telecrates calligramma Meyrick, 1890

Species of moth

Xylorycta calligramma is a moth in the family Xyloryctidae. It was described by Edward Meyrick in 1890. It is found in Australia, where it has been recorded from New South Wales.

The wingspan is 22–23 mm. The forewings are shining white with all veins marked with rather thick bronzy-fuscous streaks. The hindwings are light grey, with the veins darker, the apex suffused with whitish ochreous.
