= Xylorycta melanula =

Scientific classification
- Kingdom: Animalia
- Phylum: Arthropoda
- Class: Insecta
- Order: Lepidoptera
- Family: Xyloryctidae
- Genus: Xylorycta
- Species: X. melanula

Binomial name
- Xylorycta melanula (Meyrick, 1890)

Synonyms
- Telecrates melanula Meyrick, 1890

Species of moth

Xylorycta melanula is a moth in the family Xyloryctidae. It was described by Edward Meyrick in 1890. It is found in Australia, where it has been recorded from New South Wales.

The wingspan is 21–24 mm. The forewings are fuscous, lighter anteriorly, posteriorly slightly reddish tinged and with the dorsal half suffused with ashy grey, except for an indistinct cloudy spot towards the fold beyond the middle. The extreme costal edge is whitish from one-half to four-fifths and there is a thick dark fuscous streak beneath the submedian fold from the base to one-third, as well as a whitish dot in the disc at two-thirds. The hindwings are fuscous grey.
