= Xylorycta argyrota =

Scientific classification
- Domain: Eukaryota
- Kingdom: Animalia
- Phylum: Arthropoda
- Class: Insecta
- Order: Lepidoptera
- Family: Xyloryctidae
- Genus: Xylorycta
- Species: X. argyrota

Binomial name
- Xylorycta argyrota Lower, 1908

Species of moth

Xylorycta argyrota is a moth in the family Xyloryctidae. It was described by Oswald Bertram Lower in 1908. It is found in Australia, where it has been recorded from South Australia.

== Characteristics ==
The wingspan is about 16 mm for males and 20 mm for females. The forewings are silvery whitish, almost white in some specimens. There is a moderately clear white costal streak, from the base to three-fourths, posteriorly attenuated. The veins towards the termen are obscurely outlined with pale fuscous. The hindwings are grey.

The larvae feed on Juncus species. They bore in the stem of their host plant.
