= Xylorycta cygnella =

Scientific classification
- Kingdom: Animalia
- Phylum: Arthropoda
- Class: Insecta
- Order: Lepidoptera
- Family: Xyloryctidae
- Genus: Xylorycta
- Species: X. cygnella

Binomial name
- Xylorycta cygnella (Walker, 1864)

Synonyms
- Cryptolechia cygnella Walker, 1864

Species of moth

Xylorycta cygnella is a moth in the family Xyloryctidae. It was described by Francis Walker in 1864. It is found in Australia, where it has been recorded from Western Australia.

The wingspan is about 21 mm. Adults are white, with the forewings rounded at the tips and pale brownish beneath. The costa and exterior border are hardly convex, the latter rather oblique.
