= Xylorycta maeandria =

Scientific classification
- Kingdom: Animalia
- Phylum: Arthropoda
- Class: Insecta
- Order: Lepidoptera
- Family: Xyloryctidae
- Genus: Xylorycta
- Species: X. maeandria

Binomial name
- Xylorycta maeandria Meyrick, 1915

Species of moth

Xylorycta maeandria is a moth in the family Xyloryctidae. It was described by Edward Meyrick in 1915. It is found in Australia, where it has been recorded from New South Wales.

The wingspan is about 17 mm. The forewings are white with the costal edge tinged with pale greyish ochreous, towards the base blackish. There are four dark fuscous fasciae, the first from the middle of the costa to one-third of the dorsum, acutely angulated inwards on the fold, the second from the costa beyond the middle to two-thirds of the dorsum, connected with the first at both extremities, the third from four-fifths of the costa to the dorsum before the tornus, where it is connected with the second, the fourth terminal, connected with the third on the costa. The hindwings are grey.
