= Xylorycta castanea =

Scientific classification
- Domain: Eukaryota
- Kingdom: Animalia
- Phylum: Arthropoda
- Class: Insecta
- Order: Lepidoptera
- Family: Xyloryctidae
- Genus: Xylorycta
- Species: X. castanea

Binomial name
- Xylorycta castanea (Turner, 1902)

Synonyms
- Lichenaula castanea Turner, 1902

Species of moth

Xylorycta castanea is a moth in the family Xyloryctidae. It was described by Alfred Jefferis Turner in 1902. It is found in Australia, where it has been recorded from Victoria.

The wingspan is about 17 mm. The forewings are whitish irrorated with reddish-brown and purple-brown scales forming very confused markings. The purple-brown scales predominate along the inner margin, the reddish-brown tend to form four suffused nearly equidistant transverse fasciae. Of these, the last, which is hindmarginal, is the best marked. The hindwings are grey.
