= Xylorycta conistica =

Scientific classification
- Domain: Eukaryota
- Kingdom: Animalia
- Phylum: Arthropoda
- Class: Insecta
- Order: Lepidoptera
- Family: Xyloryctidae
- Genus: Xylorycta
- Species: X. conistica

Binomial name
- Xylorycta conistica Turner, 1917

Species of moth

Xylorycta conistica is a moth in the family Xyloryctidae. It was described by Alfred Jefferis Turner in 1917. It is found in Australia, where it has been recorded from Queensland.

The wingspan is about 29 mm for males and 43 mm for females. The forewings are whitish intimately mixed with fuscous-grey and with fuscous grey marks in the disc at one-third and beyond the middle, sometimes obsolete. There is also a fuscous-grey interrupted terminal line. The hindwings are pale grey.
