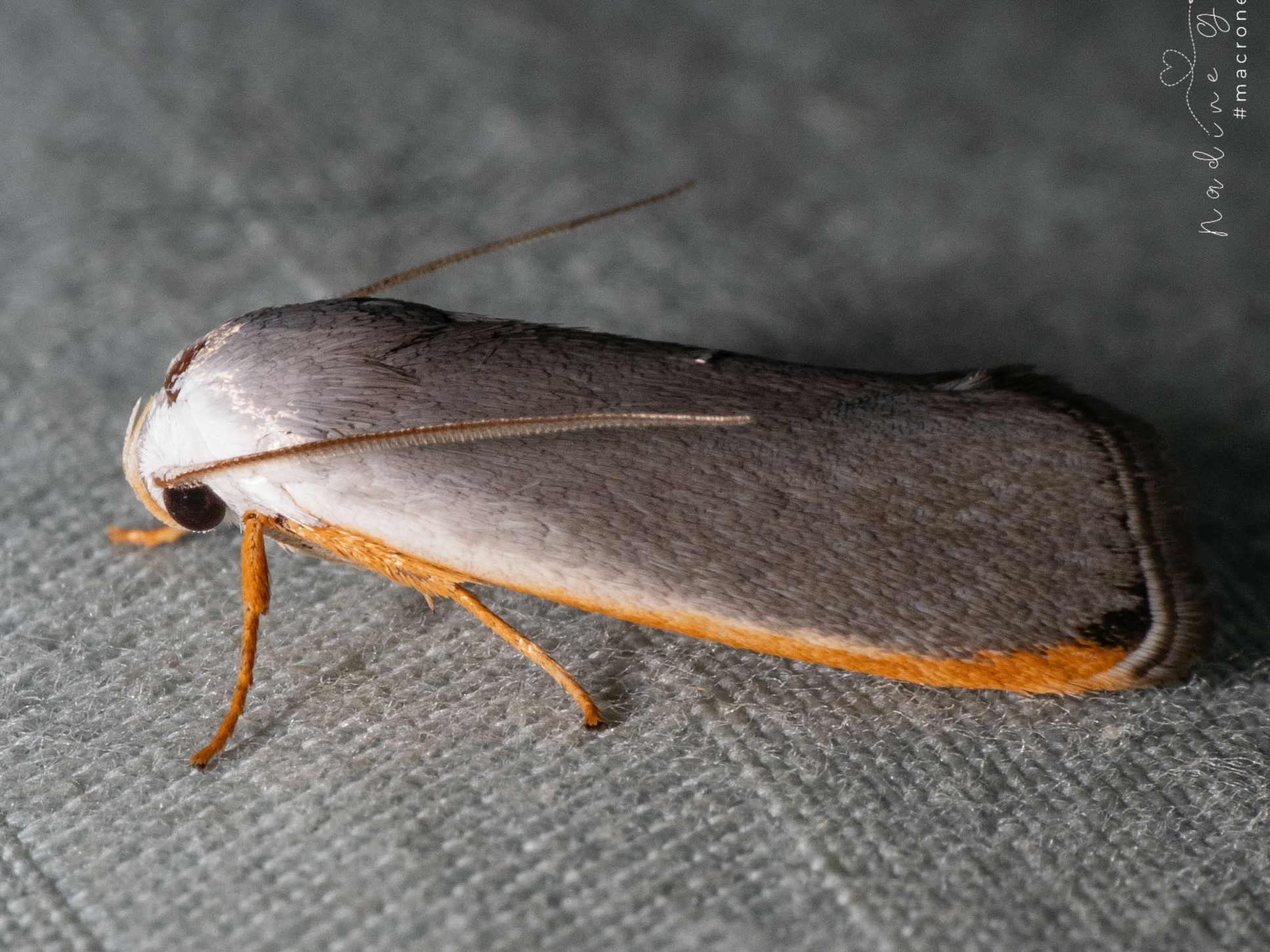

Scientific classification
- Kingdom: Animalia
- Phylum: Arthropoda
- Class: Insecta
- Order: Lepidoptera
- Family: Xyloryctidae
- Genus: Xylorycta
- Species: X. flavicosta

Binomial name
- Xylorycta flavicosta (T. P. Lucas, 1894)

Synonyms
- Cryptophaga flavicosta T. P. Lucas, 1894; Cryptophaga flavicosta ab. pallida Turner, 1898; Xylorycta ixeuta Meyrick, 1915

= Xylorycta flavicosta =

Species of moth

Xylorycta flavicosta is a species of moth in the family Xyloryctidae. It was first described by Thomas Pennington Lucas in 1894. It is found in Australia, where it has been recorded from Queensland.

== Description ==
The wingspan is 28–38 mm. The forewings are rich slaty grey, becoming ashy grey toward the basal portion of the costa. There is an orange-red costal band, more brown red in females and with a rich black velvety patch in the apical angle. The hindwings are fuscous grey.

== Behaviour and ecology ==
The larvae feed on Eucalyptus eugenioides and Eucalyptus gummifera.
