= Xylorycta sigmophora =

Scientific classification
- Domain: Eukaryota
- Kingdom: Animalia
- Phylum: Arthropoda
- Class: Insecta
- Order: Lepidoptera
- Family: Xyloryctidae
- Genus: Xylorycta
- Species: X. sigmophora

Binomial name
- Xylorycta sigmophora Lower, 1894

Species of moth

Xylorycta sigmophora is a moth in the family Xyloryctidae. It was described by Oswald Bertram Lower in 1894. It is found in Australia, where it has been recorded from New South Wales and Victoria.

The wingspan is about 35 mm. The forewings are ashy-grey whitish, minutely irrorated (sprinkled) with black and with an obscure patch of blackish scales towards the base, as well as a blackish S-shaped mark in the middle of the wing, followed by a small blackish suffusion. There is a hindmarginal row of confluent blackish dots, immediately followed by a whitish line on the extreme hindmargin. The hindwings are light fuscous.
