= Xylorycta haplochroa =

Scientific classification
- Domain: Eukaryota
- Kingdom: Animalia
- Phylum: Arthropoda
- Class: Insecta
- Order: Lepidoptera
- Family: Xyloryctidae
- Genus: Xylorycta
- Species: X. haplochroa

Binomial name
- Xylorycta haplochroa (Turner, 1898)

Synonyms
- Lichenaula haplochroa Turner, 1898; Lichenaula umbrosa Lucas, 1900

Species of moth

Xylorycta haplochroa is a moth in the family Xyloryctidae. It was described by Alfred Jefferis Turner in 1898. It is found in Australia, where it has been recorded from New South Wales and Queensland.

The wingspan is 22–25 mm for males and about 31 mm for females. The forewings are whitish sparsely irrorated with grey scales and grey below the fold. There is a grey dot on the fold below the middle, and a single or double dot in the disc at two-thirds, sometimes obsolete. The hindwings are grey-whitish.
