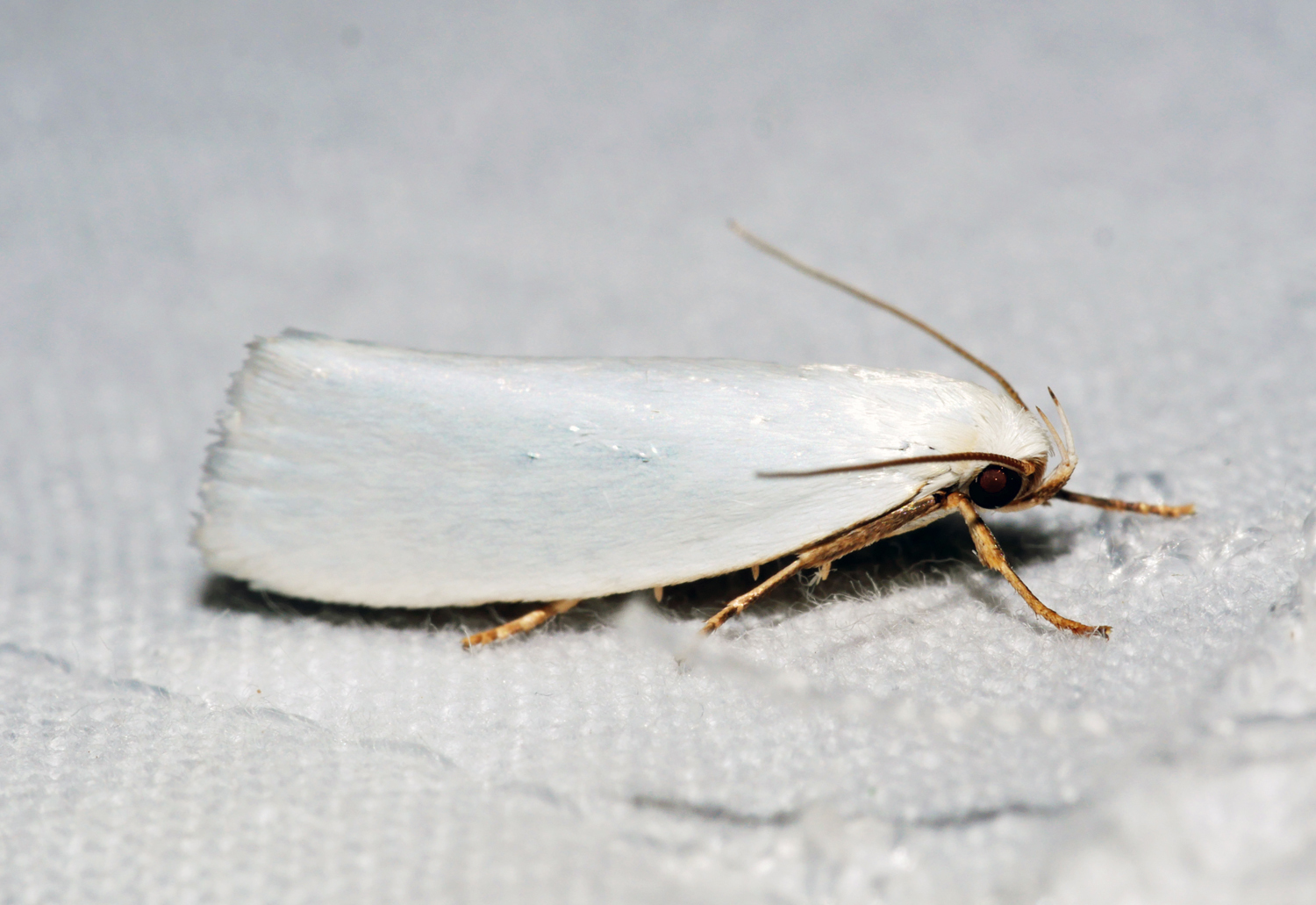

Scientific classification
- Kingdom: Animalia
- Phylum: Arthropoda
- Class: Insecta
- Order: Lepidoptera
- Family: Xyloryctidae
- Genus: Xylorycta
- Species: X. leucophanes

Binomial name
- Xylorycta leucophanes Lower, 1892

= Xylorycta leucophanes =

Species of moth

Xylorycta leucophanes is a species of moth in the family Xyloryctidae. It was first described by Oswald Bertram Lower in 1892. It is found in Australia, where it has been recorded from South Australia and Victoria.

The wingspan is 24–30 mm. The forewings are shining snow white with the costal edge blackish from the base to near the apex, posteriorly attenuated. The hindwings are pale grey whitish, darker towards the apex.

The larvae feed on Hakea species, including Hakea rugosa and Hakea sericea. They feed from within a tube of silk and frass in the leaves.
