= Xylorycta apheles =

Scientific classification
- Domain: Eukaryota
- Kingdom: Animalia
- Phylum: Arthropoda
- Class: Insecta
- Order: Lepidoptera
- Family: Xyloryctidae
- Genus: Xylorycta
- Species: X. apheles

Binomial name
- Xylorycta apheles (Turner, 1898)

Synonyms
- Neodrepta apheles Turner, 1898; Xyloricta lychnobii Lucas, 1900

Species of moth

Xylorycta apheles is a moth in the family Xyloryctidae. It was described by Alfred Jefferis Turner in 1898. It is found in Australia, where it has been recorded in New South Wales and Queensland.

The wingspan is 21–22 mm. The forewings are whitish-grey, sparsely irrorated with grey and fuscous at the base, then ochreous, whitish almost to the apex. There is an ill-defined grey triangular blotch on the centre of the inner-margin, its oblique posterior edge is very distinct. There is an ill-defined greyish line from the costa at three-fourths to before the anal angle, gently outwardly curved in the disc. The hindwings are grey.
