= Xylorycta philonympha =

Scientific classification
- Domain: Eukaryota
- Kingdom: Animalia
- Phylum: Arthropoda
- Class: Insecta
- Order: Lepidoptera
- Family: Xyloryctidae
- Genus: Xylorycta
- Species: X. philonympha

Binomial name
- Xylorycta philonympha Lower, 1903

Species of moth

Xylorycta philonympha is a moth in the family Xyloryctidae. It was described by Oswald Bertram Lower in 1903. It is found in Australia, where it has been recorded from New South Wales, the Northern Territory and South Australia.

The wingspan is 30–36 mm. The forewings are shining snow white with a narrow orange streak along the edge of the costa, from the base to just before the apex, becoming fuscous tinged on the basal one-fourth. The hindwings are pale fuscous, becoming lighter towards the base.
