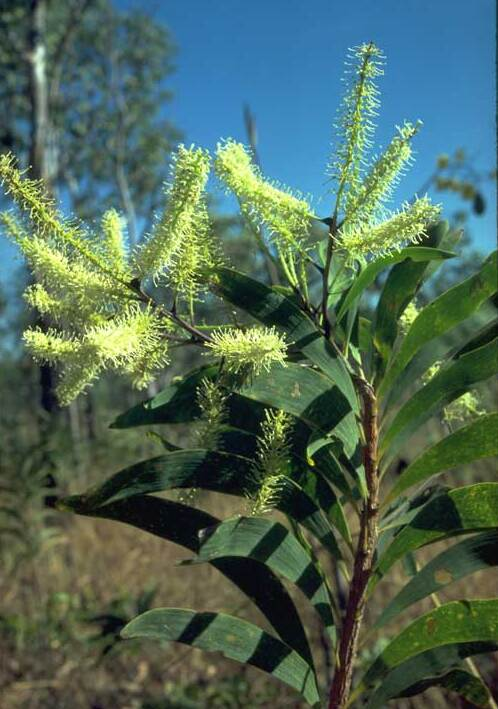
- In Kakadu National Park

Conservation status
- Least Concern (IUCN 3.1)

Scientific classification
- Kingdom: Plantae
- Clade: Tracheophytes
- Clade: Angiosperms
- Clade: Eudicots
- Order: Proteales
- Family: Proteaceae
- Genus: Grevillea
- Species: G. mimosoides

Binomial name
- Grevillea mimosoides R.Br.

= Grevillea mimosoides =

Species of shrub endemic to Australia

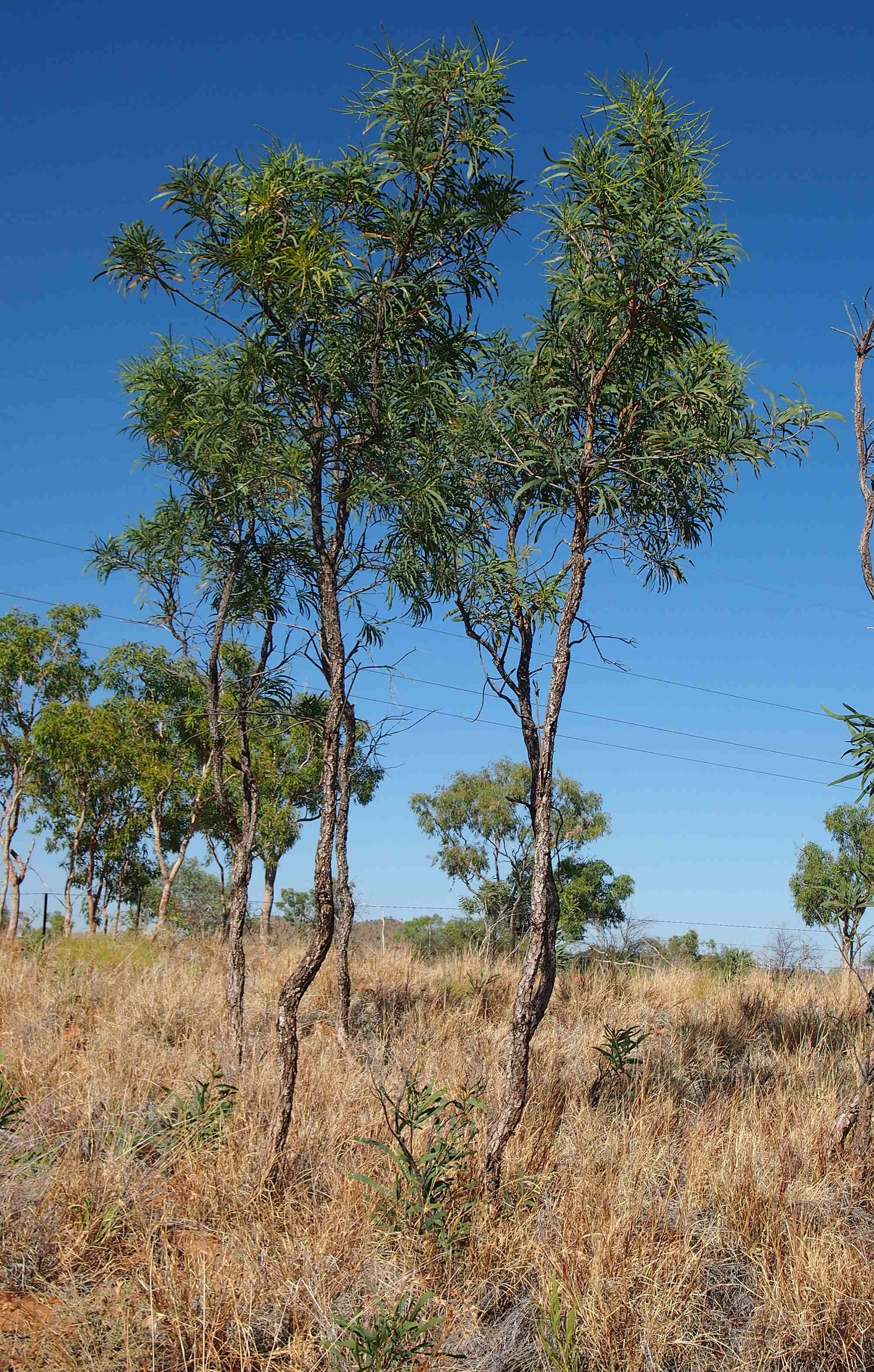
Habit

Grevillea mimosoides, commonly known as caustic bush, is a species of flowering plant in the family Proteaceae and is endemic to northern Australia. It is a shrub or small tree with curved, narrowly elliptic or egg-shaped leaves and greenish-white to cream-coloured or pale yellow flowers.

== Description ==
Grevillea microstyla is shrub or tree that typically grows to a height of 2–10 m (6 ft 7 in – 32 ft 10 in) and has thick, furrowed grey bark. Its leaves are curved, narrowly elliptic to egg-shaped with the narrower end towards the base, 65–400 mm (2.6–15.7 in) long and 6–50 mm (0.24–1.97 in) wide. The flowers are usually arranged on the ends of branches in cylindrical clusters 120–150 mm (4.7–5.9 in) long and are greenish-white to cream-coloured or pale yellow, the pistil 5–11 mm (0.20–0.43 in) long and glabrous. Flowering occurs in most months with a peak from July to September, and the fruit is a flattened elliptic to oval follicle 14–25 mm (0.55–0.98 in) long.

== Taxonomy ==
Grevillea mimosoides was first formally described in 1810 by Robert Brown in Transactions of the Linnean Society of London from specimens collected near the coast of the Gulf of Carpentaria. The specific epithet (mimosoides) means "Mimosa-like".

== Distribution and habitat ==
Caustic bush grows in shrubland or woodland, often in seasonally wet areas, and is found in the northern and western Kimberley region of Western Australia, the northern part of the Northern Territory, and north of Cloncurry, Chillagoe and Mareeba in northern Queensland.
