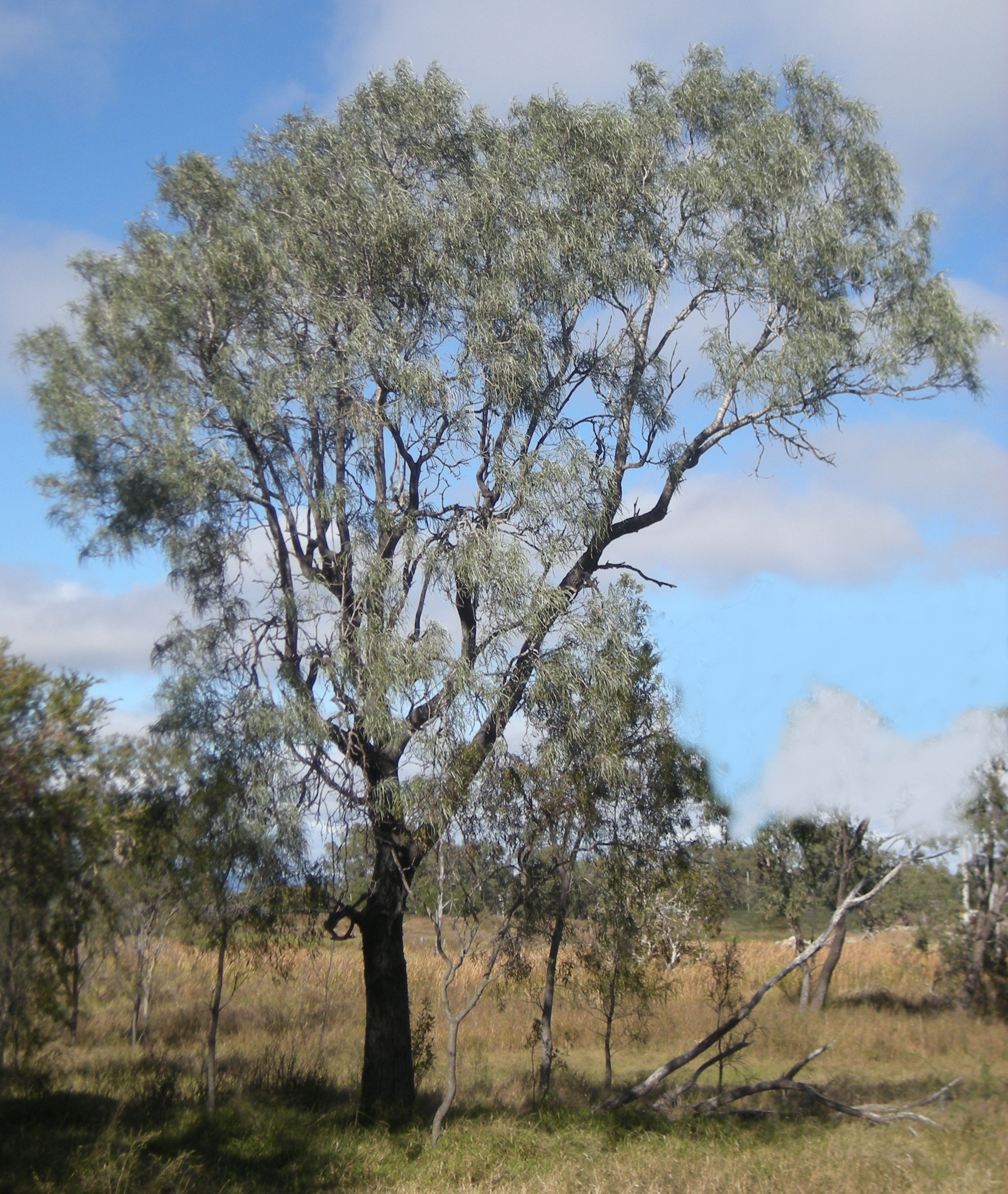
- In coastal Central Queensland

Conservation status
- Least Concern (IUCN 3.1)

Scientific classification
- Kingdom: Plantae
- Clade: Tracheophytes
- Clade: Angiosperms
- Clade: Eudicots
- Order: Proteales
- Family: Proteaceae
- Genus: Grevillea
- Species: G. striata

Binomial name
- Grevillea striata R.Br.
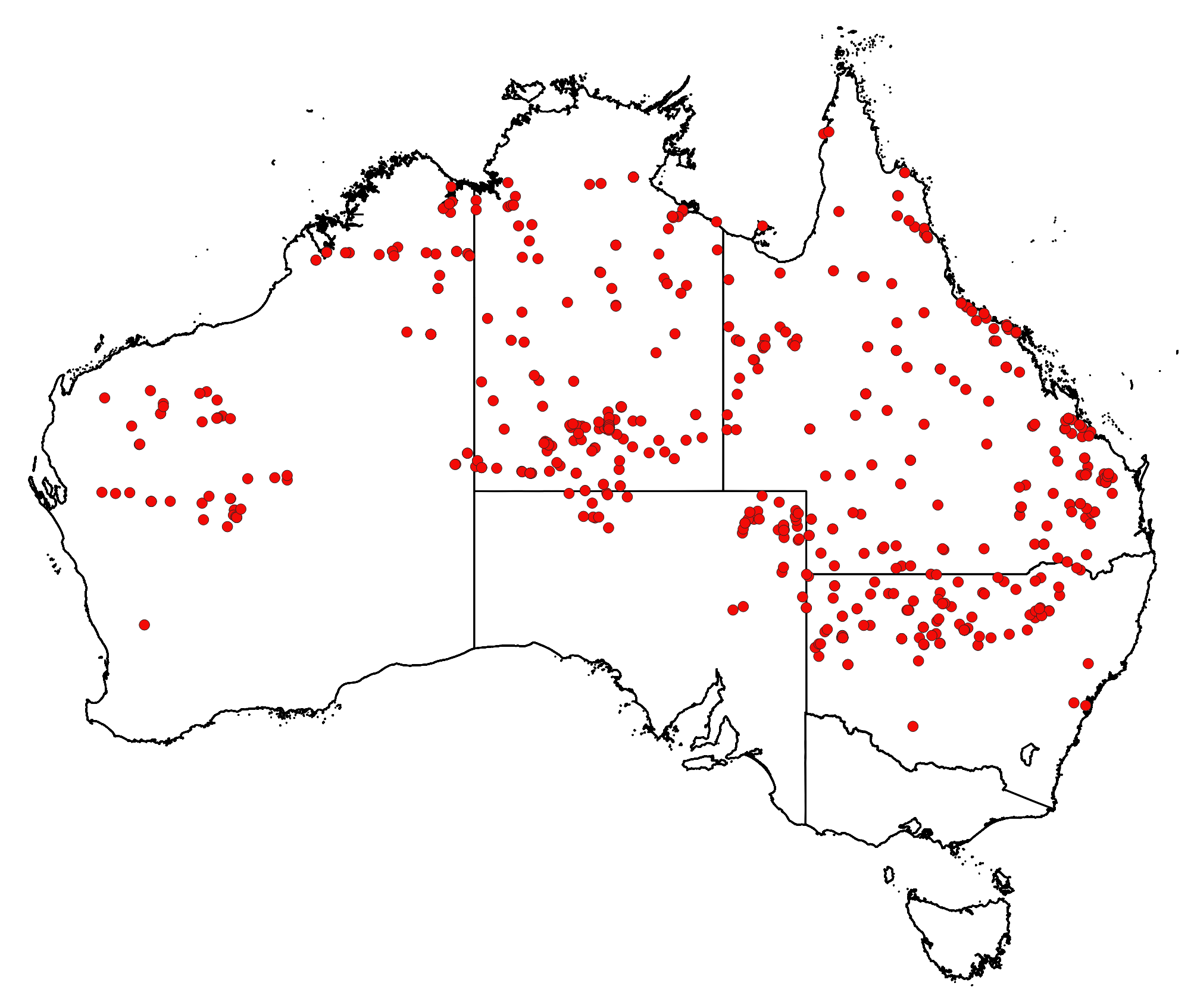
- Occurrence data from AVH

Synonyms
- List: Grevillea lineata R.Br.; Grevillea striata var. lineata (R.Br.) Domin; Grevillea striata R.Br. var. striata; Grevillea striata var. typica Domin nom. inval.

= Grevillea striata =

Beefwood

Species of shrub endemic to Western Australia

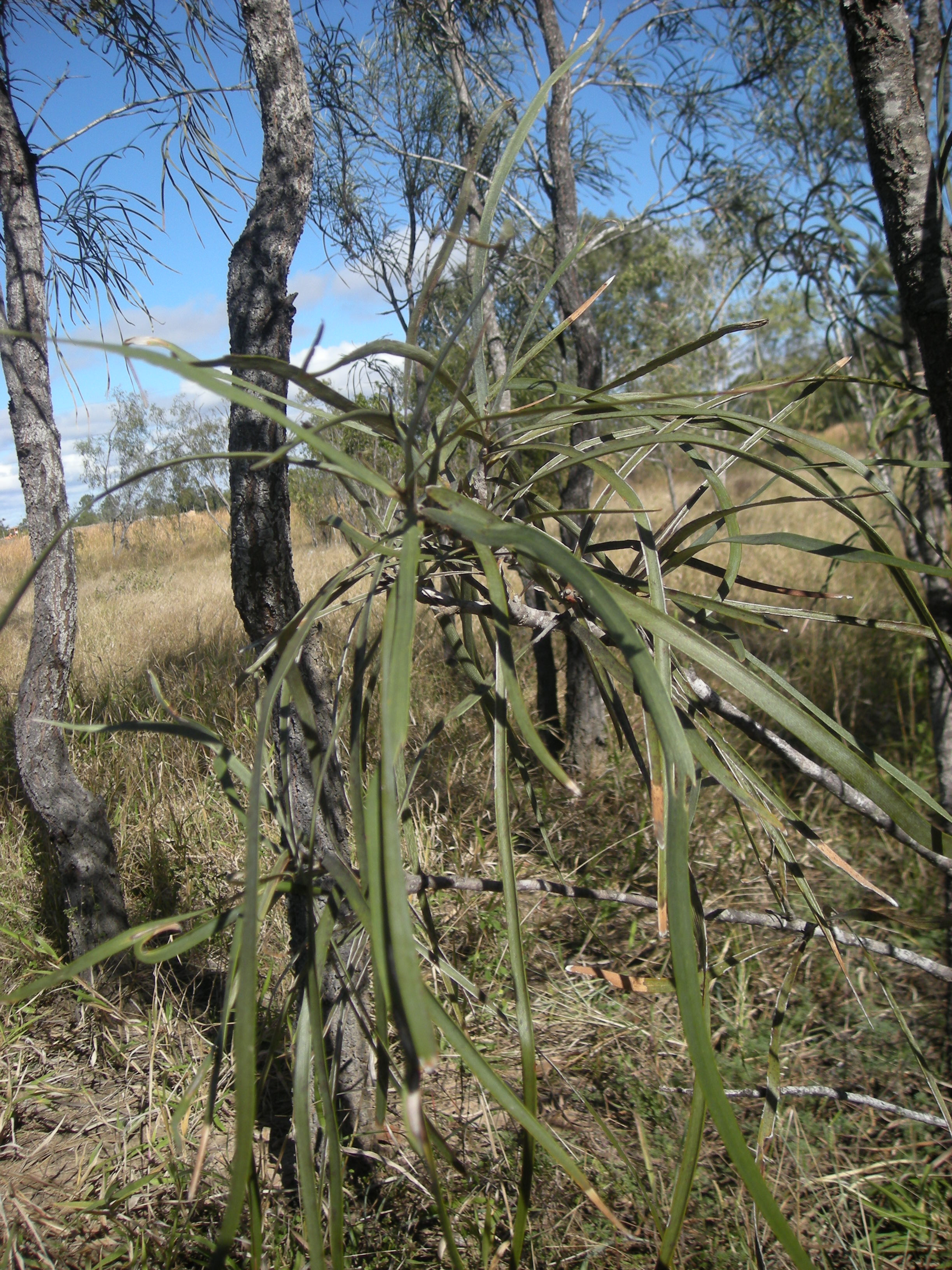
Leaves

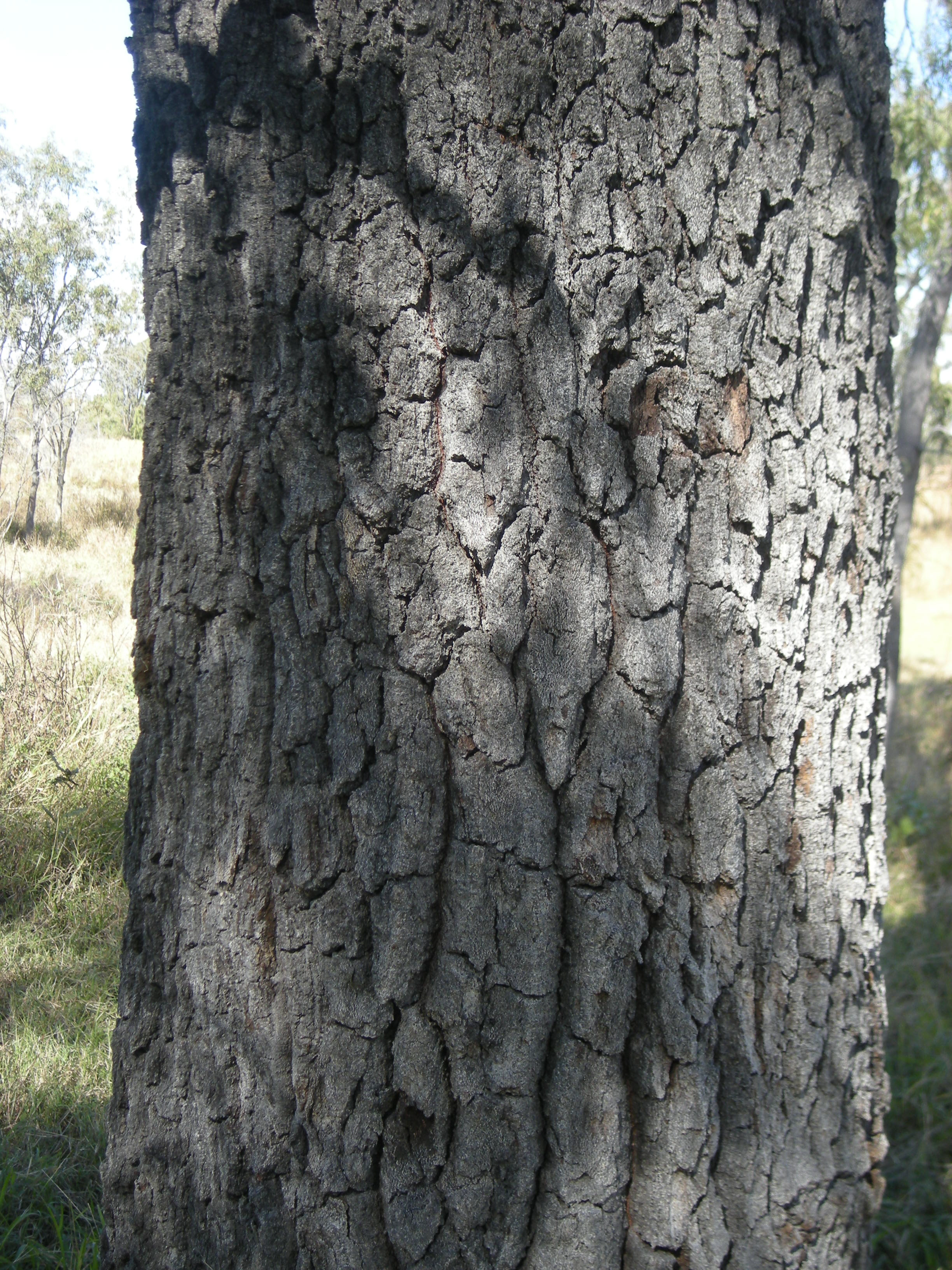
Bark

Grevillea striata, commonly known as beefwood or silver honeysuckle, is a species of flowering plant in the family Proteaceae and is endemic to continental Australia. It is a shrub or tree with linear leaves and white to cream-colured or pale yellow flowers. Other common names for this species include western beefwood, beef oak and beef silky oak.

== Description ==
Grevillea striata is an erect, spindly shrub or robust tree with dark, fissured bark, that typically grows to a height of 3–15 m (9.8–49.2 ft), the trunk up to 60 cm (24 in) in diameter. Its leaves are linear or strap-like and often wavy, 100–450 mm (3.9–17.7 in) long and 2–15 mm (0.079–0.591 in) wide. The lower surface of the leaves has 5 to 13 prominent striations. The flowers are arranged in clusters with up to 12 branches, each branch cylindrical and 50–140 mm (2.0–5.5 in) long. The flowers are white to cream-colured or pale yellow, the pistil 6–10 mm (0.24–0.39 in) long. Flowering mainly occurs from August to December, and the fruit is an almost smooth, oblong to oval follicle 13–21 mm (0.51–0.83 in) long.

== Taxonomy and naming ==
Grevillea striata was first formally described in 1810 by botanist Robert Brown in the Transactions of the Linnean Society of London, from specimens collected near the coast of the Gulf of Carpentaria. The specific epithet (striata) means "striate", referring to the veins on the lower surface of the leaves.

This species is known as beefwood due to the intense red colour of its heartwood.

== Distribution and habitat ==
Beefwood grows in woodland, shrubland and spinifex communities in a range of soil types. It occurs in all mainland states except Victoria.

Some specimens are long-lived. A tree still stands bearing an inscription in memory of James Poole, a member of Charles Sturt's expedition in 1845, although the tree must have been mature at the time of carving. Poole, having died of scurvy, was buried near a beefwood tree at Preservation Creek near Milparinka, and an inscription "JP 1845" was carved into the tree.

== Uses ==
=== Indigenous uses ===
Aboriginal people used resin from the tree to stick flints to their cutting tools. They also reportedly used charcoal from the tree to treat wounds and promote healing.

=== Building material ===
Due to its durability and the fact that it splits readily, the timber was used by early settlers for fence posts, shingles and flooring. The wood of this species is extremely dense, with a air-dry density of 965 kg/m^{3} (1,627 lb/cu yd) and a green density of 1,230 kg/m^{3} (2,070 lb/cu yd)
