= Cryptolechia (moth) =

Scientific classification
- Kingdom: Animalia
- Phylum: Arthropoda
- Clade: Pancrustacea
- Class: Insecta
- Order: Lepidoptera
- Family: Depressariidae
- Subfamily: Cryptolechiinae
- Genus: Cryptolechia; Zeller, 1852

Type species
- Cryptolechia straminella (Zeller, 1852)

Synonyms
- Melaneulia Butler, 1883; Leptosaces Meyrick, 1888; Prosarotra Meyrick, 1909; Hypsipselon Chrétien, 1915

Genus of moths

Cryptolechia is a genus of moths in the family Depressariidae.

== Species ==
- Cryptolechia aeraria Meyrick, 1910
- Cryptolechia acutiuscula Wang, 2004 (from China)
- Cryptolechia aganopis (Meyrick, 1905) (from Sri Lanka)
- Cryptolechia aliena Diakonoff, 1952 (from Burma)
- Cryptolechia alphitias Lower, 1923 (from Australia)
- Cryptolechia anthaedeaga Wang, 2003
- Cryptolechia anticentra (Meyrick, 1910) (from India)
- Cryptolechia anticrossa Meyrick, 1915 (from Australia)
- Cryptolechia argometra Meyrick, 1935 (from Taiwan)
- Cryptolechia asemanta Dognin, 1905 (from Ecuador)
- Cryptolechia bibundella (Strand, 1913) (from Cameroon)
- Cryptolechia bifoliolata Wang, 2006 (from China)
- Cryptolechia bifida Wang, 2006 (from China)
- Cryptolechia bifoliolata Wang, 2006
- Cryptolechia castella (Zeller, 1852) (from South Africa)
- Cryptolechia centroleuca Meyrick, 1922 (from India)
- Cryptolechia chlorozyga Meyrick, 1938 (from China)
- Cryptolechia chrysocoma (Meyrick, 1905) (from Sri Lanka)
- Cryptolechia citrodeta Meyrick, 1921 (from Brazil)
- Cryptolechia coelocrossa Meyrick, 1935 (from China)
- Cryptolechia conata Strand, 1917 (from Taiwan)
- Cryptolechia concaviuscula Wang, 2004 (from China)
- Cryptolechia coriaria Meyrick, 1914 (from Australia)
- Cryptolechia coriata Meyrick, 1914 (from Taiwan)
- Cryptolechia cornutivalvata Wang, 2003
- Cryptolechia deflecta Wang, 2003
- Cryptolechia denticulata Wang, 2004 (from China)
- Cryptolechia diplosticha Meyrick, 1926 (from Colombia)
- Cryptolechia dorsoprojecta Wang, 2006 (from China)
- Cryptolechia eningiella (Plötz, 1880) (from Cameroon)
- Cryptolechia eoa Meyrick, 1910 (from India)
- Cryptolechia epidesma Walsingham, 1912 (from Mexico & Br.Guyana)
- Cryptolechia epistemon Strand, 1920 (from Taiwan)
- Cryptolechia eucharistis Meyrick, 1931
- Cryptolechia falsitorophanes Wang, 2006 (from China)
- Cryptolechia falsivespertina Wang, 2003
- Cryptolechia fasciculifera Wang, 2004 (from China)
- Cryptolechia fascirupta Wang, 2003
- Cryptolechia fatua Meyrick, 1921
- Cryptolechia fenerata Meyrick, 1914
- Cryptolechia furcellata Wang, 2004 (from China)
- Cryptolechia fustiformis Wang, 2006 (from China)
- Cryptolechia gei Wang (from China)
- Cryptolechia glischrodes Meyrick, 1931
- Cryptolechia gypsochra Meyrick, 1938
- Cryptolechia hamatilis Wang, 2004 (from China)
- Cryptolechia hecate (Butler, 1883)
- Cryptolechia hemiarthra Meyrick, 1922
- Cryptolechia holopyrrha Meyrick, 1912
- Cryptolechia hoplostola Meyrick, 1938
- Cryptolechia hydara Walsingham, 1912
- Cryptolechia ichnitis Meyrick, 1918
- Cryptolechia infundibularis Wang, 2006 (from China)
- Cryptolechia iridias Meyrick, 1910
- Cryptolechia isomichla Meyrick, 1938
- Cryptolechia jigongshanica Wang, 2003
- Cryptolechia kangxianensis Wang, 2003
- Cryptolechia laica Meyrick, 1910
- Cryptolechia latifascia Wang, 2004 (from China)
- Cryptolechia lindsayae Philpott, 1928
- Cryptolechia luniformis Wang, 2006 (from China)
- Cryptolechia mataea (Meyrick, 1910) (from India)
- Cryptolechia mellispersa Diakonoff, 1952 (from Birma)
- Cryptolechia metacentra Meyrick, 1914 (from Taiwan)
- Cryptolechia micracma Meyrick, 1910 (from Sri Lanka)
- Cryptolechia microbyrsa Wang, 2003
- Cryptolechia microglyptis Meyrick, 1936
- Cryptolechia mirabilis Wang, 2003
- Cryptolechia mitis Meyrick, 1914 (from Taiwan)
- Cryptolechia modularis Meyrick, 1921 (from Java)
- Cryptolechia municipalis Meyrick, 1920 (from Australia)
- Cryptolechia murcidella Christoph, 1877 (from Iran)
- Cryptolechia muscosa Wang, 2004
- Cryptolechia neargometra Wang, 2003
- Cryptolechia olivaria Wang, 2006 (from China)
- Cryptolechia orthotoma (Meyrick, 1905) (from Sri Lanka)
- Cryptolechia orthrarcha Meyrick, 1930 (from Algeria)
- Cryptolechia paranthaedeaga Wang, 2003
- Cryptolechia pateropa Meyrick, 1931 (from Brazil)
- Cryptolechia peditata Wang, 2006 (from China)
- Cryptolechia pelophaea Meyrick, 1931 (from Taiwan)
- Cryptolechia pentathlopa Meyrick, 1933 (from Brazil)
- Cryptolechia percnocoma Meyrick, 1930 (from Brazil)
- Cryptolechia perversa Meyrick, 1918 (from India)
- Cryptolechia phoebas (Meyrick, 1907) (from India)
- Cryptolechia picrocentra Meyrick, 1921 (from India)
- Cryptolechia praevecta Meyrick, 1929 (from Colombia)
- Cryptolechia prothyropa Meyrick, 1938 (from China)
- Cryptolechia proximideflecta Wang, 2004
- Cryptolechia proximihamatilis Wang, 2006 (from China)
- Cryptolechia pytinaea (Meyrick, 1902) (from Australia)
- Cryptolechia rectimarginalis Wang, 2006 (from China)
- Cryptolechia remotella (Staudinger, 1899)
- Cryptolechia rhodobapta Meyrick, 1923
- Cryptolechia rigidellum (Chrétien, 1915) (from Algeria)
- Cryptolechia robusta Wang, 2006 (from China)
- Cryptolechia rostriformis Wang, 2006 (from China)
- Cryptolechia schistopa (Meyrick, 1902) (from Australia)
- Cryptolechia sciodeta Meyrick, 1930 (from Brazil)
- Cryptolechia semibrunnea Dognin, 1905 (from Ecuador)
- Cryptolechia similifloralis Wang, 2006 (from China)
- Cryptolechia solifasciaria Wang, 2004 (from China)
- Cryptolechia sperans Meyrick, 1926 (from Borneo)
- Cryptolechia spinifera Wang, 2004 (from China)
- Cryptolechia stadaea Meyrick, 1934 (from China)
- Cryptolechia sticta Wang, 2006 (from China)
- Cryptolechia stictifascia Wang, 2003
- Cryptolechia straminella (Zeller, 1852) (from South Africa)
- Cryptolechia taphrocopa Meyrick, 1926 (from Colombia)
- Cryptolechia temperata Meyrick, 1910 (from India)
- Cryptolechia tetraspilella (Walker, 1864) (from Sri Lanka)
- Cryptolechia transfossa Meyrick, 1926 (from Peru)
- Cryptolechia trimaculata Wang, 2006 (from China)
- Cryptolechia tyrochyta Meyrick, 1910 (from India)
- Cryptolechia varifascirupta Wang, 2003
- Cryptolechia veniflua Meyrick, 1914 (from Colombia)
- Cryptolechia vespertina Meyrick, 1910 (from India)
- Cryptolechia viridisignata (Strand, 1913) (from Equatorial Guinea)
- Cryptolechia zeloxantha Meyrick, 1934 (from China)
- Cryptolechia zhengi Wang, 2003

== Former species ==
- Cryptolechia amphigramma Meyrick, 1915
- Cryptolechia anomarcha Meyrick, 1915
- Cryptolechia argyropasta (Walsingham, 1912)
- Cryptolechia arvalis Meyrick, 1910
- Cryptolechia compsotypa (Meyrick, 1886)
- Cryptolechia dochaea Meyrick, 1910
- Cryptolechia empalacta Meyrick, 1915
- Cryptolechia exagitata Meyrick, 1926
- Cryptolechia facunda (Meyrick, 1910)
- Cryptolechia ferrorubella Walker, 1864
- Cryptolechia leptopa Diakonoff, 1952
- Cryptolechia liochroa (Meyrick, 1891)
- Cryptolechia malacobyrsa Meyrick, 1921
- Cryptolechia malaisei Diakonoff, 1952
- Cryptolechia phaeocausta Meyrick, 1934
- Cryptolechia propriella Zeller, 1877
- Cryptolechia purpurascens (Walsingham, 1912)
- Cryptolechia synclera Meyrick, 1921
- Cryptolechia torophanes Meyrick, 1935
