= Allotalanta =

Scientific classification
- Kingdom: Animalia
- Phylum: Arthropoda
- Class: Insecta
- Order: Lepidoptera
- Family: Cosmopterigidae
- Subfamily: Cosmopteriginae
- Genus: Allotalanta; Meyrick, 1913

Genus of moths

Allotalanta is a genus of moths in the family Cosmopterigidae. It was first described by Edward Meyrick in 1913.

== Species ==
- Allotalanta autophaea Meyrick, 1913 (Turkey, Taurus Mountains)
- Allotalanta clonomicta Meyrick, 1927 (South Africa, KwaZulu-Natal)
- Allotalanta crocomitra Meyrick, 1914 (India, Kanara)
- Allotalanta deceptrix Meyrick, 1925 (China, Liaoning)
- Allotalanta globulosa Meyrick, 1914 (Sri Lanka)
- Allotalanta lacteata Meyrick, 1914 (India, Coorg)
- Allotalanta ochthotoma Meyrick, 1930 (Cameroon)
- Allotalanta oporista Meyrick, 1926 (New Ireland)
- Allotalanta spilothyris Meyrick, 1922 (India, Assam)
- Allotalanta synclera (Meyrick, 1921) (India, Kanara)
- Allotalanta tephroclystis Meyrick, 1930 (Cameroon)

== Former species ==
- Allotalanta triocellata (Stainton, 1859) (India)
