= Cryptolechia proximihamatilis =

Scientific classification
- Kingdom: Animalia
- Phylum: Arthropoda
- Clade: Pancrustacea
- Class: Insecta
- Order: Lepidoptera
- Family: Depressariidae
- Genus: Cryptolechia
- Species: C. proximihamatilis

Binomial name
- Cryptolechia proximihamatilis Wang, 2006

Species of moth

Cryptolechia proximihamatilis is a moth in the family Depressariidae. It was described by Wang in 2006. It is found in Sichuan, China.

The length of the forewings is about 12.5 mm.

== Etymology ==
The species name refers to the similarity with Cryptolechia hamatilis plus the Latin prefix proxim- (meaning near).
