= Stenoma straminella =

Scientific classification
- Kingdom: Animalia
- Phylum: Arthropoda
- Class: Insecta
- Order: Lepidoptera
- Family: Depressariidae
- Genus: Stenoma
- Species: S. straminella

Binomial name
- Stenoma straminella (Walker, 1864)

Synonyms
- Cryptolechia straminella Walker, 1864 (not Cryptolechia straminella Zeller, 1852)

Species of moth

Stenoma straminella is a moth in the family Depressariidae. It was described by Francis Walker in 1864. It is found in Amazonas, Brazil.

Adults are pale straw colour, the forewings hardly acute, with four black points. The first point close to the base, the second at one-fourth of the length, the third a little beyond the second and more hindward and the fourth beyond the middle. There is an incomplete outward-curved row of submarginal black points and the exterior border is rather oblique. The hindwings are whitish.
