= Cryptolechia falsitorophanes =

Scientific classification
- Kingdom: Animalia
- Phylum: Arthropoda
- Clade: Pancrustacea
- Class: Insecta
- Order: Lepidoptera
- Family: Depressariidae
- Genus: Cryptolechia
- Species: C. falsitorophanes

Binomial name
- Cryptolechia falsitorophanes Wang, 2006

Species of moth

Cryptolechia falsitorophanes is a moth in the family Depressariidae. It was described by Wang in 2006. It is found in Hubei, China.

The length of the forewings is 11.5–12 mm.

== Etymology ==
The species name refers to the similarity with Cryptolechia torophanes and is derived from Latin falsus (meaning false).
