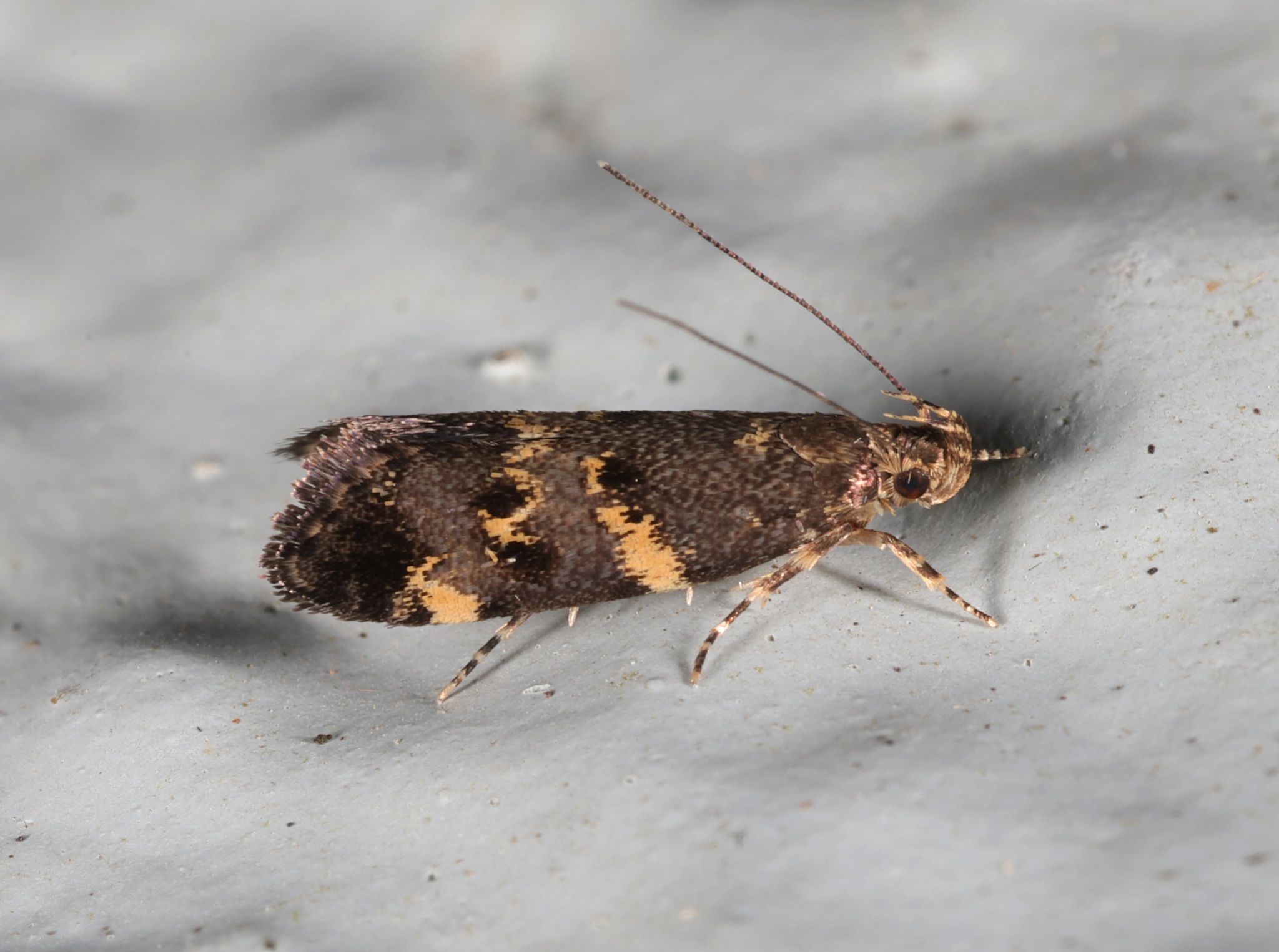
- Meleonoma flavilineata

Scientific classification
- Kingdom: Animalia
- Phylum: Arthropoda
- Class: Insecta
- Order: Lepidoptera
- Family: Autostichidae
- Subfamily: Periacminae
- Tribe: Meleonomini
- Genus: Meleonoma; Meyrick, 1914

Type species
- Meleonoma stomota (Meyrick, 1910)

Synonyms
- Acryptolechia Lvovsky, 2010

= Meleonoma =

Genus of moths

Meleonoma is a genus of moths in the family Autostichidae.

== Taxonomic history & placement ==
Meleonoma was established by Edward Meyrick in 1914, who placed the genus in the family Oecophoridae. Subsequently, Clarke (1965) listed the genus in the family Cosmopterigidae. Park & Park (2016) attributed the genus to Lypusidae sensu Lvovsky (2015), although shortly after, Yin & Wang (2016a & 2016b) placed the genus as incertae sedis within Gelechioidea and then in Oecophoridae, followed by Kitajima & Salamaki (2019) when studying the Japanese species. Furthermore, Lvovsky (2015) synonymized the genus Acryptolechia (at that time placed in Cryptolechiinae of Depressariidae) with Meleonoma. More recently, Wang & Li (2020) studied the molecular phylogeny of Gelechioidea, and found Meleonoma plus Phaulolechia formed a clade constituting the tribe Meleonomini, sister to Periacma + Irepacma + Epiracma, constituting the Periacmini, bringing both tribes together to form the subfamily Periacminae, in Autostichidae.

Most recently, there has been a flurry of publications on the genus: Yin & Cai (2019) described two new species from Guangxi and Fujian provinces, China; Wang et al. (2020) reviewed the genus, retained the placement in Meleonomini (Autostichidae, Periacminae) and provided a global checklist, including transferring 50 species from the moth genus Cryptolechia; Zhu et al. (2020) described 16 new species from Hainan Island, China; Yin et al. (2020) described three new species from Yunnan province, China; lastly, Wang & Zhu (2020a & 2020b) described a further 36 species from China.

== Species ==
(species groupings follow Wang et al., 2020 and Wang & Zhu (2020a & 2020b)

- the malacobyrsa group
  - Meleonoma anisodonta Wang & Zhu, 2020
  - Meleonoma dorsoprojecta (Wang, 2006)
  - Meleonoma lanceolata Wang & Zhu, 2020
  - Meleonoma longaedeaga Wang & Zhu, 2020
  - Meleonoma lunulata Wang & Zhu, 2020
  - Meleonoma malacobyrsa (Meyrick, 1921)
  - Meleonoma microbyrsa (Wang, 2003)
  - Meleonoma papillata Wang & Zhu, 2020
  - Meleonoma robusta (Wang, 2006)
  - Meleonoma rugulosa Wang & Zhu, 2020
- the segregnatha group
  - Meleonoma acutata Wang & Zhu, 2020
  - Meleonoma apicispinata Wang, 2016
  - Meleonoma acutata Wang & Zhu, 2020
  - Meleonoma basiprocessa Wang & Zhu, 2020
  - Meleonoma bicornea Wang & Zhu, 2020
  - Meleonoma bidigitata Wang & Zhu, 2020
  - Meleonoma brevicula Park, 2016
  - Meleonoma circinans Wang & Zhu, 2020
  - Meleonoma compacta Wang & Zhu, 2020
  - Meleonoma cuneata Wang & Zhu, 2020
  - Meleonoma flavifasciana Kitajima & Sakamaki, 2019
  - Meleonoma flavilineata Kitajima & Sakamaki, 2019
  - Meleonoma forcipata Wang & Zhu, 2020
  - Meleonoma infundibularis (Wang, 2006)
  - Meleonoma ledongensis Wang & Zhu, 2020
  - Meleonoma liui (Wang, 2006)
  - Meleonoma longihamata Wang & Zhu, 2020
  - Meleonoma mecobursoides Wang & Zhu, 2020
  - Meleonoma microdonta Wang & Zhu, 2020
  - Meleonoma papillisetosa Wang & Zhu, 2020
  - Meleonoma parallela Wang & Zhu, 2020
  - Meleonoma recticostata Wang & Zhu, 2020
  - Meleonoma rostriformis (Wang, 2006)
  - Meleonoma segregnatha Wang & Zhu, 2020
  - Meleonoma taeniophylla Wang & Zhu, 2020
  - Meleonoma tamraensis Park, 2016
  - Meleonoma trimaculata (Wang, 2006)
- the annulignatha group
  - Meleonoma artivalva Wang & Zhu, 2020
  - Meleonoma annulignatha Wang & Zhu, 2020
  - Meleonoma bifoliolata (Wang, 2006)
  - Meleonoma sinuicosta Wang & Zhu, 2020
  - Meleonoma taiwanensis Wang & Zhu, 2020
- the fasciptera group
  - Meleonoma argometra (Meyrick, 1935)
  - Meleonoma concaviuscula (Wang, 2004)
  - Meleonoma denticulata (Wang, 2004)
  - Meleonoma falsitorophanes (Wang, 2006)
  - Meleonoma kangxianensis (Wang, 2003)
  - Meleonoma latifascia (Wang, 2004)
  - Meleonoma muscosa (Wang, 2004)
  - Meleonoma neargometra (Wang, 2003)
  - Meleonoma proximideflecta (Wang, 2004)
  - Meleonoma solifasciaria (Wang, 2004)
  - Meleonoma spinifera (Wang, 2004)
  - Meleonoma stictifascia (Wang, 2003)
  - Meleonoma zeloxantha (Meyrick, 1934)
- the jigongshanica group
  - Meleonoma cornutivalvata (Wang, 2003)
  - Meleonoma jigongshanica (Wang, 2003)
- the dentivalvata group
  - Meleonoma anthaedeaga (Wang, 2003)
  - Meleonoma deflecta (Wang, 2003)
  - Meleonoma falsivespertina (Wang, 2003)
  - Meleonoma fascirupta (Wang, 2003)
  - Meleonoma furcellata (Wang, 2004)
  - Meleonoma gei (Wang, 2003)
  - Meleonoma luniformis (Wang, 2006)
  - Meleonoma menglana (Wang, 2006)
  - Meleonoma paranthaedeaga (Wang, 2003)
  - Meleonoma proximihamatilis (Wang, 2006)
  - Meleonoma rectimarginalis (Wang, 2006)
  - Meleonoma similifloralis (Wang, 2006)
  - Meleonoma torophanes (Meyrick, 1935)
  - Meleonoma varifascirupta (Wang, 2003)
  - Meleonoma zhengi (Wang, 2003)
- the facialis group
  - Meleonoma anticentra (Meyrick, 1910)
  - Meleonoma aridula (Meyrick, 1910)
  - Meleonoma bilobata Wang, 2016
  - Meleonoma catenata Wang & Zhu, 2020
  - Meleonoma dierli Lvovsky, 2015
  - Meleonoma dilativalva Wang & Zhu, 2020
  - Meleonoma dorsibacilliformis Wang & Zhu, 2020
  - Meleonoma dorsolobulata Wang, 2016
  - Meleonoma echinata Li, 2004
  - Meleonoma elongata Wang, 2016
  - Meleonoma facialis Li & Wang, 2002
  - Meleonoma facunda (Meyrick, 1910)
  - Meleonoma fasciculifera (Wang, 2004)
  - Meleonoma foliata Li, 2004
  - Meleonoma heterota Meyrick, 1914
  - Meleonoma japonica Kitajima et Sakamaki, 2019
  - Meleonoma jubingella Lvovsky, 2015
  - Meleonoma longiprocessa Wang & Zhu, 2020
  - Meleonoma malacognatha Li, 2002
  - Meleonoma margisclerotica Wang, 2016
  - Meleonoma meyricki Lvovsky, 2015
  - Meleonoma montana Lvovsky, 2015
  - Meleonoma nepalella Lvovsky, 2015
  - Meleonoma nephospora Meyrick, 1930
  - Meleonoma parvissima Wang & Zhu, 2020
  - Meleonoma petrota Meyrick, 1914
  - Meleonoma polychaeta Li, 2004
  - Meleonoma stomota (Meyrick, 1910)
  - Meleonoma tianmushana Wang & Zhu, 2020
  - Meleonoma tenuiuncata Wang & Zhu, 2020
  - Meleonoma triacantha Wang & Zhu, 2020
  - Meleonoma triangula Wang, 2016
  - Meleonoma ventrospinosa Wang & Zhu, 2020
- the acutiuscula group
  - Meleonoma acutiuscula (Wang, 2004)
  - Meleonoma fustiformis (Wang, 2006)
  - Meleonoma mirabilis (Wang, 2003)
  - Meleonoma olivaria (Wang, 2006)
  - Meleonoma peditata (Wang, 2006)

== Species awaiting assignment to existing or as yet undefined groups ==
- Meleonoma bifida (Wang, 2006)
- Meleonoma concolora (Wang, 2006)
- Meleonoma flavimaculata (Christoph, 1882)
- Meleonoma foliiformis Yin, 2019
- Meleonoma hamatilis (Wang, 2004)
- Meleonoma implexa Meyrick, 1918
- Meleonoma leishana (Wang, 2006)
- Meleonoma pardalias Meyrick, 1931
- Meleonoma projecta Yin, 2019
- Meleonoma sticta (Wang, 2006)
- Meleonoma vespertina (Meyrick, 1910)
- Meleonoma wenxianica (Wang, 2006)
- Meleonoma apicicurvata Wang, 2020
- Meleonoma apicirectangula Wang, 2020
- Meleonoma bicuspidata Wang, 2020
- Meleonoma bidentata Wang, 2020
- Meleonoma conica Wang, 2020
- Meleonoma hainanensis Wang, 2020
- Meleonoma latiunca Wang, 2020
- Meleonoma linearis Wang, 2020
- Meleonoma magnidentata Wang, 2020
- Meleonoma ornithorrhyncha Wang, 2020
- Meleonoma parilis Wang, 2020
- Meleonoma pectinalis Wang, 2020
- Meleonoma puncticulata Wang, 2020
- Meleonoma quadritaeniata Wang, 2020
- Meleonoma robustispina Wang, 2020
- Meleonoma rostellata Wang, 2020
- Meleonoma plicata Yin, Zhi & Cai, 2020
- Meleonoma scalprata Yin, Zhi & Cai, 2020
- Meleonoma taeniata Yin, Zhi & Cai, 2020

== Species incertae sedis ==
sensu Wang et al., 2020, i.e. current placement to genus is uncertain and may be revised

- Meleonoma capnodyta (Meyrick, 1906)
- Meleonoma crocomitra (Meyrick, 1914)
- Meleonoma diehlella Viette, 1955
- Meleonoma impulsa Meyrick, 1934
- Meleonoma psammota Meyrick, 1915

== Former species ==
- Meleonoma basanista Meyrick, 1922, a junior synonym of Meioglossa pentochra (Lower, 1894)

== Bibliography ==
- Natural History Museum Lepidoptera genus database
- Park & Park, 2016. Two new species of the genus Meleonoma Meyrick (Lepidoptera, Lypusidae) from Korea.
- Data related to Meleonoma at Wikispecies
- Media related to Meleonoma at Wikimedia Commons
