= Cryptolechia temperata =

Scientific classification
- Kingdom: Animalia
- Phylum: Arthropoda
- Clade: Pancrustacea
- Class: Insecta
- Order: Lepidoptera
- Family: Depressariidae
- Genus: Cryptolechia
- Species: C. temperata

Binomial name
- Cryptolechia temperata Meyrick, 1910

Species of moth

Cryptolechia temperata is a moth in the family Depressariidae. It was described by Edward Meyrick in 1910. It is found in the Himalayas in India.

The wingspan is 20–24 mm. The forewings are ochreous-yellow tinged with brownish towards the termen. The stigmata is brownish. The hindwings are light grey, tinged with pale ochreous.
