= Cryptolechia transfossa =

Scientific classification
- Kingdom: Animalia
- Phylum: Arthropoda
- Clade: Pancrustacea
- Class: Insecta
- Order: Lepidoptera
- Family: Depressariidae
- Genus: Cryptolechia
- Species: C. transfossa

Binomial name
- Cryptolechia transfossa Meyrick, 1926

Species of moth

Cryptolechia transfossa is a moth in the family Depressariidae. It was described by Edward Meyrick in 1926. It is found in Peru.

The wingspan is about 24 mm. The forewings are light ochreous-brown, with numerous irregularly strewn transverse whitish-ochreous strigae. There is a rather oblique streak of darker bronzy-brown suffusion from the end of the cell to the dorsum and there are three large black marginal dots around the apex, the middle one smallest and three very small dots on the termen below them. The hindwings are dark grey.
