= Cryptolechia peditata =

Scientific classification
- Kingdom: Animalia
- Phylum: Arthropoda
- Clade: Pancrustacea
- Class: Insecta
- Order: Lepidoptera
- Family: Depressariidae
- Genus: Cryptolechia
- Species: C. peditata

Binomial name
- Cryptolechia peditata Wang, 2006

Species of moth

Cryptolechia peditata is a moth in the family Depressariidae. It was described by Wang in 2006. It is found in Hubei, China.

The length of the forewings is 12.5–13 mm. The hindwings are grey.

== Etymology ==
The species name refers to the foot-shaped valva and is derived from Latin peditatus (meaning foot).
