= Meleonoma pardalias =

Scientific classification
- Kingdom: Animalia
- Phylum: Arthropoda
- Class: Insecta
- Order: Lepidoptera
- Family: Autostichidae
- Subfamily: Periacminae
- Tribe: Meleonomini
- Genus: Meleonoma
- Species: M. pardalias

Binomial name
- Meleonoma pardalias Meyrick, 1931

Species of moth

Meleonoma pardalias is a moth in the family Cosmopterigidae. It is found in China.
