= Cryptolechia coelocrossa =

Scientific classification
- Kingdom: Animalia
- Phylum: Arthropoda
- Clade: Pancrustacea
- Class: Insecta
- Order: Lepidoptera
- Family: Depressariidae
- Genus: Cryptolechia
- Species: C. coelocrossa

Binomial name
- Cryptolechia coelocrossa Meyrick, 1935

Species of moth

Cryptolechia coelocrossa is a moth in the family Depressariidae. It was described by Edward Meyrick in 1935. It is found in China.
