= Cryptolechia sperans =

Scientific classification
- Kingdom: Animalia
- Phylum: Arthropoda
- Clade: Pancrustacea
- Class: Insecta
- Order: Lepidoptera
- Family: Depressariidae
- Genus: Cryptolechia
- Species: C. sperans

Binomial name
- Cryptolechia sperans Meyrick, 1926

Species of moth

Cryptolechia sperans is a moth in the family Depressariidae. It was described by Edward Meyrick in 1926. It is found on Borneo.

The wingspan is about 17 mm. The forewings are purplish-grey irrorated with dark fuscous. The stigmata is indistinct, dark-fuscous and accompanied by one or two whitish scales. There is also a small ochreous-whitish flattened-triangular spot on the costa at about three-fourths. The hindwings are dark grey.
