= Cryptolechia coriaria =

Scientific classification
- Kingdom: Animalia
- Phylum: Arthropoda
- Clade: Pancrustacea
- Class: Insecta
- Order: Lepidoptera
- Family: Depressariidae
- Genus: Cryptolechia
- Species: C. coriaria

Binomial name
- Cryptolechia coriaria Meyrick, 1914

Species of moth

Cryptolechia coriaria is a moth in the family Depressariidae. It was described by Edward Meyrick in 1914. It is found in Australia, where it has been recorded from Victoria.

The wingspan is 14–15 mm. The forewings are brownish-ochreous, sprinkled with dark fuscous. The stigmata is blackish and there are suffused triangular fuscous spots on the costa in the middle and at three-fourths. The hindwings are grey.
