= Cryptolechia hemiarthra =

Scientific classification
- Kingdom: Animalia
- Phylum: Arthropoda
- Clade: Pancrustacea
- Class: Insecta
- Order: Lepidoptera
- Family: Depressariidae
- Genus: Cryptolechia
- Species: C. hemiarthra

Binomial name
- Cryptolechia hemiarthra Meyrick, 1922

Species of moth

Cryptolechia hemiarthra is a moth in the family Depressariidae. It was described by Edward Meyrick in 1922. It is found in southern India.

The wingspan is about 19 mm. The forewings are pale brownish-ochreous, with scattered dark fuscous specks. The stigmata are blackish, the plical somewhat beyond the first discal, the second discal transverse-linear, connected with the dorsum before the tornus by a dark fuscous streak followed by some irroration. The terminal area is somewhat darker, with a lighter inwards-oblique spot on the costa towards the apex.
