= Allotalanta globulosa =

Scientific classification
- Kingdom: Animalia
- Phylum: Arthropoda
- Class: Insecta
- Order: Lepidoptera
- Family: Cosmopterigidae
- Genus: Allotalanta
- Species: A. globulosa

Binomial name
- Allotalanta globulosa Meyrick, 1914

Species of moth

Allotalanta globulosa is a moth in the family Cosmopterigidae. It was described by Edward Meyrick in 1914. It is found in India (Assam) and Sri Lanka.
