= Cryptolechia epidesma =

Scientific classification
- Kingdom: Animalia
- Phylum: Arthropoda
- Clade: Pancrustacea
- Class: Insecta
- Order: Lepidoptera
- Family: Depressariidae
- Genus: Cryptolechia
- Species: C. epidesma

Binomial name
- Cryptolechia epidesma Walsingham, 1912

Synonyms
- Cryptolechia vallifera Meyrick, 1914

Species of moth

Cryptolechia epidesma is a moth in the family Depressariidae. It was described by Thomas de Grey, 6th Baron Walsingham, in 1912. It is found in Mexico to Guyana.

The wingspan is about 16 mm. The forewings are dark purplish-fuscous with a narrow irregular-edged pale whitish-yellowish streak along the costa from the base to near the apex, the costal edge sprinkled with black towards the base. There is a slightly waved yellow-whitish line along the termen. The hindwings are rather dark grey.
