= Cryptolechia infundibularis =

Scientific classification
- Kingdom: Animalia
- Phylum: Arthropoda
- Clade: Pancrustacea
- Class: Insecta
- Order: Lepidoptera
- Family: Depressariidae
- Genus: Cryptolechia
- Species: C. infundibularis

Binomial name
- Cryptolechia infundibularis Wang, 2006

Species of moth

Cryptolechia infundibularis is a moth in the family Depressariidae. It was described by Wang in 2006. It is found in Guangxi, China.

The length of the forewings is about 17.5 mm. The forewings are dark brown, with scattered ochreous scales. There are large ochreous markings at the costal two-fifths, costal one-fifth and ventral half. The hindwings are dark brown.

== Etymology ==
The species name refers to the shape of antrum in the female genitalia and is derived from Latin infundibularis (meaning funnel shaped).
