= Cryptolechia rigidellum =

Scientific classification
- Kingdom: Animalia
- Phylum: Arthropoda
- Clade: Pancrustacea
- Class: Insecta
- Order: Lepidoptera
- Family: Depressariidae
- Genus: Cryptolechia
- Species: C. rigidellum

Binomial name
- Cryptolechia rigidellum (Chrétien, 1915)

Synonyms
- Hypsipselon rigidellum Chrétien, 1915; Hypsipselon rigidellum var. zeroudellum Chrétien, 1915

Species of moth

Cryptolechia rigidellum is a moth in the family Depressariidae. It was described by Pierre Chrétien in 1915. It is found in Algeria.
