= Cryptolechia furcellata =

Scientific classification
- Kingdom: Animalia
- Phylum: Arthropoda
- Clade: Pancrustacea
- Class: Insecta
- Order: Lepidoptera
- Family: Depressariidae
- Genus: Cryptolechia
- Species: C. furcellata

Binomial name
- Cryptolechia furcellata Wang, 2004

Species of moth

Cryptolechia furcellata is a moth in the family Depressariidae. It was described by Wang in 2004. It is found in China (Guizhou).
