= Cryptolechia fatua =

Scientific classification
- Kingdom: Animalia
- Phylum: Arthropoda
- Clade: Pancrustacea
- Class: Insecta
- Order: Lepidoptera
- Family: Depressariidae
- Genus: Cryptolechia
- Species: C. fatua

Binomial name
- Cryptolechia fatua Meyrick, 1921

Species of moth

Cryptolechia fatua is a moth in the family Depressariidae. It was described by Edward Meyrick in 1921. It is found on Java.

The wingspan is about 15 mm. The forewings are pale ochreous sprinkled with grey, the base of the costa grey. The stigmata is small, dark fuscous, the first discal larger, the plical somewhat beyond it and an additional dot beneath and somewhat beyond the second discal. There is a terminal series of small indistinct dark fuscous dots. The hindwings are light grey.
