= Cryptolechia holopyrrha =

Scientific classification
- Kingdom: Animalia
- Phylum: Arthropoda
- Clade: Pancrustacea
- Class: Insecta
- Order: Lepidoptera
- Family: Depressariidae
- Genus: Cryptolechia
- Species: C. holopyrrha

Binomial name
- Cryptolechia holopyrrha Meyrick, 1912

Species of moth

Cryptolechia holopyrrha is a moth in the family Depressariidae. It was described by Edward Meyrick in 1912. It is found in Colombia.

The wingspan is 28–38 mm. The forewings are deep ferruginous-brown. The stigmata are obscure, cloudy and darker, the plical rather beyond the first discal. There is a very faint paler strongly curved subterminal line. The hindwings range from pale to rather dark reddish-fuscous.
