= Cryptolechia chrysocoma =

Scientific classification
- Kingdom: Animalia
- Phylum: Arthropoda
- Clade: Pancrustacea
- Class: Insecta
- Order: Lepidoptera
- Family: Depressariidae
- Genus: Cryptolechia
- Species: C. chrysocoma

Binomial name
- Cryptolechia chrysocoma (Meyrick, 1905)

Synonyms
- Phaeosaces chrysocoma Meyrick, 1905

Species of moth

Cryptolechia chrysocoma is a moth in the family Depressariidae. It was described by Edward Meyrick in 1905. It is found in Sri Lanka.

The wingspan is about 16 mm. The forewings are dark shining purplish-bronzy-fuscous. The costal edge is yellow except at the base and apex. The hindwings are dark bronzy-fuscous.
