= Meleonoma capnodyta =

Scientific classification
- Kingdom: Animalia
- Phylum: Arthropoda
- Class: Insecta
- Order: Lepidoptera
- Family: Autostichidae
- Subfamily: Periacminae
- Tribe: Meleonomini
- Genus: Meleonoma
- Species: M. capnodyta

Binomial name
- Meleonoma capnodyta (Meyrick, 1906): Borkhausenia capnodyta Meyrick, 1906

Species of moth

Meleonoma capnodyta is a moth in the family Cosmopterigidae. It is found in Australia, where it has been recorded from Queensland.
