= Cryptolechia taphrocopa =

Scientific classification
- Kingdom: Animalia
- Phylum: Arthropoda
- Clade: Pancrustacea
- Class: Insecta
- Order: Lepidoptera
- Family: Depressariidae
- Genus: Cryptolechia
- Species: C. taphrocopa

Binomial name
- Cryptolechia taphrocopa Meyrick, 1926

Species of moth

Cryptolechia taphrocopa is a moth in the family Depressariidae. It was described by Edward Meyrick in 1926. It is found in Colombia.

The wingspan is 28–36 mm. The forewings are reddish-brown, sometimes largely suffused whitish-ochreous, the veins and costal edge marked with white lines, between the veins partially and irregularly mixed with dark fuscous. There are some white scales posteriorly and the discal stigmata is blackish. The hindwings are grey, but darker posteriorly.
