= Cryptolechia picrocentra =

Scientific classification
- Kingdom: Animalia
- Phylum: Arthropoda
- Clade: Pancrustacea
- Class: Insecta
- Order: Lepidoptera
- Family: Depressariidae
- Genus: Cryptolechia
- Species: C. picrocentra

Binomial name
- Cryptolechia picrocentra Meyrick, 1921

Species of moth

Cryptolechia picrocentra is a moth in the family Depressariidae. It was described by Edward Meyrick in 1921. It is found in India (Assam).

The wingspan is 16–17 mm. The forewings are pale ochreous irregularly sprinkled with fuscous. The stigmata is dark fuscous, the plical rather obliquely beyond the first discal and the second discal is large. There is some fuscous suffusion extending from the second discal to the apex, darker posteriorly. There are also minute dark fuscous terminal dots. The hindwings are grey.
