= Cryptolechia murcidella =

Scientific classification
- Kingdom: Animalia
- Phylum: Arthropoda
- Clade: Pancrustacea
- Class: Insecta
- Order: Lepidoptera
- Family: Depressariidae
- Genus: Cryptolechia
- Species: C. murcidella

Binomial name
- Cryptolechia murcidella Christoph, 1877

Species of moth

Cryptolechia murcidella is a moth in the family Depressariidae. It was described by Hugo Theodor Christoph in 1877. It is found in Iran.
