= Cryptolechia semibrunnea =

Scientific classification
- Kingdom: Animalia
- Phylum: Arthropoda
- Clade: Pancrustacea
- Class: Insecta
- Order: Lepidoptera
- Family: Depressariidae
- Genus: Cryptolechia
- Species: C. semibrunnea

Binomial name
- Cryptolechia semibrunnea Dognin, 1905

Species of moth

Cryptolechia semibrunnea is a moth in the family Depressariidae. It was described by Paul Dognin in 1905. It is found in Ecuador (Loja Province).
