= Cryptolechia eoa =

Scientific classification
- Kingdom: Animalia
- Phylum: Arthropoda
- Clade: Pancrustacea
- Class: Insecta
- Order: Lepidoptera
- Family: Depressariidae
- Genus: Cryptolechia
- Species: C. eoa

Binomial name
- Cryptolechia eoa Meyrick, 1910

Species of moth

Cryptolechia eoa is a moth in the family Depressariidae. It was described by Edward Meyrick in 1910. It is found in India (Assam).

The wingspan is about 24 mm. The forewings are light greyish-ochreous, almost wholly suffused with light rose-pink except in the middle of the disc and a narrow whitish-ochreous terminal facia. There are some scattered minute dots and strigulae of blackish scales, as well as a blackish basal fascia and a small black costal spot at three-fifths. The hindwings are light greyish-ochreous, more greyish posteriorly and with three or four grey marks on the upper part of the termen.
