= Cryptolechia eucharistis =

Scientific classification
- Kingdom: Animalia
- Phylum: Arthropoda
- Clade: Pancrustacea
- Class: Insecta
- Order: Lepidoptera
- Family: Depressariidae
- Genus: Cryptolechia
- Species: C. eucharistis

Binomial name
- Cryptolechia eucharistis Meyrick, 1931

Species of moth

Cryptolechia eucharistis is a moth in the family Depressariidae. It was described by Edward Meyrick in 1931. It is found in Argentina.
