= Cryptolechia orthotoma =

Scientific classification
- Kingdom: Animalia
- Phylum: Arthropoda
- Clade: Pancrustacea
- Class: Insecta
- Order: Lepidoptera
- Family: Depressariidae
- Genus: Cryptolechia
- Species: C. orthotoma

Binomial name
- Cryptolechia orthotoma (Meyrick, 1905)

Synonyms
- Phaeosaces orthotoma Meyrick, 1905

Species of moth

Cryptolechia orthotoma is a moth in the family Depressariidae. It was described by Edward Meyrick in 1905. It is found in Sri Lanka.

The wingspan is 14–17 mm for males and 15–21 mm for females. The forewings are pale fuscous, with the costal edge narrowly whitish ochreous. The discal stigmata is dark fuscous, partially whitish edged. The second is large and connected with the apex of a triangular pretornal blotch of dark fuscous suffusion. Its anterior edge is vertical and margined with ochreous-whitish. There is also a terminal series of dark fuscous dots continued around the apex. The hindwings are light fuscous, but darker posteriorly.
