= Cryptolechia praevecta =

Scientific classification
- Kingdom: Animalia
- Phylum: Arthropoda
- Clade: Pancrustacea
- Class: Insecta
- Order: Lepidoptera
- Family: Depressariidae
- Genus: Cryptolechia
- Species: C. praevecta

Binomial name
- Cryptolechia praevecta Meyrick, 1929

Species of moth

Cryptolechia praevecta is a moth in the family Depressariidae. It was described by Edward Meyrick in 1929. It is found in Colombia.
