= Cryptolechia tyrochyta =

Scientific classification
- Kingdom: Animalia
- Phylum: Arthropoda
- Clade: Pancrustacea
- Class: Insecta
- Order: Lepidoptera
- Family: Depressariidae
- Genus: Cryptolechia
- Species: C. tyrochyta

Binomial name
- Cryptolechia tyrochyta Meyrick, 1910

Species of moth

Cryptolechia tyrochyta is a moth in the family Depressariidae. It was described by Edward Meyrick in 1910. It is found in southern India.

The wingspan is 19–20 mm. The forewings are light yellow-ochreous. The hindwings are grey.
