= Meleonoma malacognatha =

Scientific classification
- Kingdom: Animalia
- Phylum: Arthropoda
- Class: Insecta
- Order: Lepidoptera
- Family: Autostichidae
- Subfamily: Periacminae
- Tribe: Meleonomini
- Genus: Meleonoma
- Species: M. malacognatha

Binomial name
- Meleonoma malacognatha H.H.Li & S.X.Wang, 2002

Species of moth

Meleonoma malacognatha is a moth in the family Cosmopterigidae. It is found in China (Shaanxi).
