= Cryptolechia modularis =

Scientific classification
- Kingdom: Animalia
- Phylum: Arthropoda
- Clade: Pancrustacea
- Class: Insecta
- Order: Lepidoptera
- Family: Depressariidae
- Genus: Cryptolechia
- Species: C. modularis

Binomial name
- Cryptolechia modularis Meyrick, 1921

Species of moth

Cryptolechia modularis is a moth in the family Depressariidae. It was described by Edward Meyrick in 1921. It is found on Java.

The wingspan is about 24 mm. The forewings are light ochreous-brown, the costa is more ochreous, at the base suffused with dark fuscous. The stigmata is blackish, the plical somewhat beyond the first discal and there is an indistinct subterminal shade. There is a marginal series of small blackish dots around the posterior part of the costa and termen. The hindwings are grey.
