= Cryptolechia isomichla =

Scientific classification
- Kingdom: Animalia
- Phylum: Arthropoda
- Clade: Pancrustacea
- Class: Insecta
- Order: Lepidoptera
- Family: Depressariidae
- Genus: Cryptolechia
- Species: C. isomichla

Binomial name
- Cryptolechia isomichla Meyrick, 1938

Species of moth

Cryptolechia isomichla is a moth in the family Depressariidae. It was described by Edward Meyrick in 1938. It is found in the Chinese provinces of Shaanxi and Yunnan.
