= Cryptolechia rectimarginalis =

Scientific classification
- Kingdom: Animalia
- Phylum: Arthropoda
- Clade: Pancrustacea
- Class: Insecta
- Order: Lepidoptera
- Family: Depressariidae
- Genus: Cryptolechia
- Species: C. rectimarginalis

Binomial name
- Cryptolechia rectimarginalis Wang, 2006

Species of moth

Cryptolechia rectimarginalis is a moth in the family Depressariidae. It was described by Wang in 2006. It is found in Yunnan, China.

The length of the forewings is 18.5–20 mm. The forewings are dark brown. The hindwings are grey.

== Etymology ==
The species name refers to the straight distal margin of the valva and is derived from Latin rect (meaning straight) and marginalis (meaning margin).
