= Meleonoma psammota =

Scientific classification
- Kingdom: Animalia
- Phylum: Arthropoda
- Class: Insecta
- Order: Lepidoptera
- Family: Autostichidae
- Subfamily: Periacminae
- Tribe: Meleonomini
- Genus: Meleonoma
- Species: M. psammota

Binomial name
- Meleonoma psammota Meyrick, 1915

Species of moth

Meleonoma psammota is a moth in the family Cosmopterigidae. It is found in Australia, where it has been recorded from Tasmania.
