= Cacochroa =

Scientific classification
- Kingdom: Animalia
- Phylum: Arthropoda
- Clade: Pancrustacea
- Class: Insecta
- Order: Lepidoptera
- Family: Depressariidae
- Subfamily: Cryptolechiinae
- Genus: Cacochroa; Heinemann, 1870

Type species
- "Anchinia permixtella" Herrich-Schäffer, 1854

Synonyms
- Cacophyia Rebel, 1901

Genus of moths

Cacochroa is a moth genus of the superfamily Gelechioidea.

== Taxonomy ==
The systematic placement is problematic due to insufficient research. Formerly, it was often placed in tribe Orophiini of subfamily Oecophorinae, in particular in older treatments it is variously placed in a distinct tribe Cacochroini and/or assigned to subfamily Depressariinae (treated as a subfamily of the Elachistidae). It is now placed in the independent family Depressariidae of Gelechioidea.

== Species ==
- Cacochroa corfuella Lvovsky, 2000
- Cacochroa permixtella (Herrich-Schaffer, 1854)
