= Cryptolechia pentathlopa =

Scientific classification
- Kingdom: Animalia
- Phylum: Arthropoda
- Clade: Pancrustacea
- Class: Insecta
- Order: Lepidoptera
- Family: Depressariidae
- Genus: Cryptolechia
- Species: C. pentathlopa

Binomial name
- Cryptolechia pentathlopa Meyrick, 1933

Species of moth

Cryptolechia pentathlopa is a moth in the family Depressariidae. It was described by Edward Meyrick in 1933. It is found in Brazil.
