= Cryptolechia aeraria =

Scientific classification
- Kingdom: Animalia
- Phylum: Arthropoda
- Clade: Pancrustacea
- Class: Insecta
- Order: Lepidoptera
- Family: Depressariidae
- Genus: Cryptolechia
- Species: C. aeraria

Binomial name
- Cryptolechia aeraria Meyrick, 1910

Species of moth

Cryptolechia aeraria is a moth in the family Depressariidae. It was described by Edward Meyrick in 1910. It is found in India (Assam).

The wingspan is 9–11 mm. The forewings are dark purplish-fuscous, sprinkled with blackish and with some ochreous-yellow scales towards the costa anteriorly. There is a rather broad undefined median fascia of ochreous-yellow irroration and there are some scattered ochreous-yellow scales posteriorly. The hindwings are dark fuscous.
