= Cryptolechia falsivespertina =

Scientific classification
- Kingdom: Animalia
- Phylum: Arthropoda
- Clade: Pancrustacea
- Class: Insecta
- Order: Lepidoptera
- Family: Depressariidae
- Genus: Cryptolechia
- Species: C. falsivespertina

Binomial name
- Cryptolechia falsivespertina Wang, 2003

Species of moth

Cryptolechia falsivespertina is a moth in the family Depressariidae. It was described by Wang in 2003. It is found in the Chinese provinces of Shaanxi and Sichuan.
