= Cryptolechia micracma =

Scientific classification
- Kingdom: Animalia
- Phylum: Arthropoda
- Clade: Pancrustacea
- Class: Insecta
- Order: Lepidoptera
- Family: Depressariidae
- Genus: Cryptolechia
- Species: C. micracma

Binomial name
- Cryptolechia micracma Meyrick, 1910

Species of moth

Cryptolechia micracma is a moth in the family Depressariidae. It was described by Edward Meyrick in 1910. It is found in Sri Lanka.

The wingspan is 12–13 mm. The forewings are deep ochreous-yellow, sprinkled with dark fuscous. The stigmata is dark fuscous and there is a dark fuscous spot on the costa at two-thirds. There is also a terminal fascia of dark fuscous suffusion or irroration. The hindwings of the males are pale yellowish, while those of the females are light grey.
