= Cryptolechia microglyptis =

Scientific classification
- Kingdom: Animalia
- Phylum: Arthropoda
- Clade: Pancrustacea
- Class: Insecta
- Order: Lepidoptera
- Family: Depressariidae
- Genus: Cryptolechia
- Species: C. microglyptis

Binomial name
- Cryptolechia microglyptis Meyrick, 1936

Species of moth

Cryptolechia microglyptis is a moth in the family Depressariidae. It was described by Edward Meyrick in 1936. It is found in Venezuela.
