= Cryptolechia olivaria =

Scientific classification
- Kingdom: Animalia
- Phylum: Arthropoda
- Clade: Pancrustacea
- Class: Insecta
- Order: Lepidoptera
- Family: Depressariidae
- Genus: Cryptolechia
- Species: C. olivaria

Binomial name
- Cryptolechia olivaria Wang, 2006

Species of moth

Cryptolechia olivaria is a moth in the family Depressariidae. It was described by Wang in 2006. It is found in Zhejiang, China.

The length of the forewings is about 14.5 mm. The forewings are pale yellow.
