= Cryptolechia fustiformis =

Scientific classification
- Kingdom: Animalia
- Phylum: Arthropoda
- Clade: Pancrustacea
- Class: Insecta
- Order: Lepidoptera
- Family: Depressariidae
- Genus: Cryptolechia
- Species: C. fustiformis

Binomial name
- Cryptolechia fustiformis Wang, 2006

Species of moth

Cryptolechia fustiformis is a moth in the family Depressariidae. It was described by Wang in 2006. It is found in Zhejiang, China.

The length of the forewings is 13–13.5 mm. The hindwings are grey.
