= Cryptolechia hydara =

Scientific classification
- Kingdom: Animalia
- Phylum: Arthropoda
- Clade: Pancrustacea
- Class: Insecta
- Order: Lepidoptera
- Family: Depressariidae
- Genus: Cryptolechia
- Species: C. hydara

Binomial name
- Cryptolechia hydara Walsingham, 1912

Species of moth

Cryptolechia hydara is a moth in the family Depressariidae. It was described by Lord Walsingham in 1912. It is found in Guatemala.

The wingspan is about 20 mm. The forewings are pale fawn-ochreous, blotched and sprinkled with dark brown. A dark brown spot at the extreme base of the costa is followed by a dark brown costal patch before the middle, with another below and a little before it. Beyond the middle are about five small dark costal spots along the base of the fawn-ochreous cilia, and from the first, second, and last of these the sprinkling of dark brown tends to form broken lines of scale-spots, somewhat parallel with the apex and termen, there is also a group of similar scales at the end of the cell. The hindwings are shining, whitish ochreous.
