= Cryptolechia centroleuca =

Scientific classification
- Kingdom: Animalia
- Phylum: Arthropoda
- Clade: Pancrustacea
- Class: Insecta
- Order: Lepidoptera
- Family: Depressariidae
- Genus: Cryptolechia
- Species: C. centroleuca

Binomial name
- Cryptolechia centroleuca Meyrick, 1922

Species of moth

Cryptolechia centroleuca is a moth in the family Depressariidae. It was described by Edward Meyrick in 1922. It is found in India (Sikkim).

The wingspan is about 18 mm. The forewings are whitish-ochreous with some scattered dark fuscous scales. The costa is yellowish-tinged, with some blackish specks and there is a narrow fuscous basal patch, suffusedly extended along the costa to one-fourth. The plical and first discal stigmata are small, black and the plical rather posterior, while the second discal is whitish, surrounded with a cloud of fuscous suffusion and darkest immediately around it. The veins beyond the cell are somewhat marked with fuscous and there is a blotch of fuscous suffusion on the costa towards the apex. There is also a terminal series of blackish dots. The hindwings are rather light grey.
