= Cryptolechia hecate =

Scientific classification
- Kingdom: Animalia
- Phylum: Arthropoda
- Clade: Pancrustacea
- Class: Insecta
- Order: Lepidoptera
- Family: Depressariidae
- Genus: Cryptolechia
- Species: C. hecate

Binomial name
- Cryptolechia hecate (Butler, 1883)

Synonyms
- Melaneulia hecate Butler, 1883

Species of moth

Cryptolechia hecate is a moth in the family Depressariidae. It was described by Arthur Gardiner Butler in 1883. It is found in Chile.

The wingspan is about 17 mm. Adults are smoky black, the forewings above changing in certain lights to purplish. There is a reddish-cupreous curved marking at the end of the cell and there are a few scales of the same colour on the lower half of the dorsal margin, and a few more on the fringe towards the apex.
