= Cryptolechia sticta =

Scientific classification
- Kingdom: Animalia
- Phylum: Arthropoda
- Clade: Pancrustacea
- Class: Insecta
- Order: Lepidoptera
- Family: Depressariidae
- Genus: Cryptolechia
- Species: C. sticta

Binomial name
- Cryptolechia sticta Wang, 2006

Species of moth

Cryptolechia sticta is a moth in the family Depressariidae. It was described by Wang in 2006. It is found in Sichuan, China.

The length of the forewings is 16–16.5 mm. The forewings are lutescent (yellowish). The hindwings are pale grey.

== Etymology ==
The specific name refers to the black dots of the forewing and is derived from Latin stictus (meaning spotted).
