= Cryptolechia alphitias =

Scientific classification
- Kingdom: Animalia
- Phylum: Arthropoda
- Clade: Pancrustacea
- Class: Insecta
- Order: Lepidoptera
- Family: Depressariidae
- Genus: Cryptolechia
- Species: C. alphitias

Binomial name
- Cryptolechia alphitias Lower, 1923

Species of moth

Cryptolechia alphitias is a moth in the family Depressariidae. It was described by Oswald Bertram Lower in 1923. It is found in Australia, where it has been recorded from New South Wales.

The wingspan is 16–20 mm. The forewings are dull whitish, suffusedly irrorated with pale fuscous. The markings are fuscous and there is a curved series of three obscure basal spots, as well as an obscure outwardly-curved narrow fascia, from the costa about one-fourth to the dorsum at one-fourth. There is also a moderately broad, suffused and somewhat interrupted direct postmedian fascia, which is darkest on the margins, as well as a curved series of dots, parallel to termen, from the costa at five-sixths to the tornus, indented below the costa. The hindwings are grey-whitish.
