= Cryptolechia epistemon =

Scientific classification
- Kingdom: Animalia
- Phylum: Arthropoda
- Clade: Pancrustacea
- Class: Insecta
- Order: Lepidoptera
- Family: Depressariidae
- Genus: Cryptolechia
- Species: C. epistemon

Binomial name
- Cryptolechia epistemon Strand, 1920

Species of moth

Cryptolechia epistemon is a moth in the family Depressariidae, described by Strand in 1920 from Taiwan.
