= Allotalanta autophaea =

Scientific classification
- Kingdom: Animalia
- Phylum: Arthropoda
- Class: Insecta
- Order: Lepidoptera
- Family: Cosmopterigidae
- Genus: Allotalanta
- Species: A. autophaea

Binomial name
- Allotalanta autophaea Meyrick, 1913

Species of moth

Allotalanta autophaea is a moth of the family Cosmopterigidae. It is found in Turkey.

The wingspan is 19–20 mm (0.75–0.79 in). Adults are on wing in June.
