= Cryptolechia conata =

Scientific classification
- Kingdom: Animalia
- Phylum: Arthropoda
- Clade: Pancrustacea
- Class: Insecta
- Order: Lepidoptera
- Family: Depressariidae
- Genus: Cryptolechia
- Species: C. conata

Binomial name
- Cryptolechia conata Strand, 1917

Species of moth

Cryptolechia conata is a moth in the family Depressariidae. It was described by Strand in 1917. It is found in Taiwan.
