= Allotalanta lacteata =

Scientific classification
- Kingdom: Animalia
- Phylum: Arthropoda
- Class: Insecta
- Order: Lepidoptera
- Family: Cosmopterigidae
- Genus: Allotalanta
- Species: A. lacteata

Binomial name
- Allotalanta lacteata Meyrick, 1914

Species of moth

Allotalanta lacteata is a moth in the family Cosmopterigidae. It was described by Edward Meyrick in 1914. It is found in India (Coorg) and Sri Lanka.
