= Cryptolechia orthrarcha =

Scientific classification
- Kingdom: Animalia
- Phylum: Arthropoda
- Clade: Pancrustacea
- Class: Insecta
- Order: Lepidoptera
- Family: Depressariidae
- Genus: Cryptolechia
- Species: C. orthrarcha

Binomial name
- Cryptolechia orthrarcha Meyrick, 1930

Species of moth

Cryptolechia orthrarcha is a moth in the family Depressariidae. It was described by Edward Meyrick in 1930. It is found in Algeria.

The wingspan is about 24 mm. The forewings are whitish. The hindwings are white.
