= Cryptolechia pateropa =

Scientific classification
- Kingdom: Animalia
- Phylum: Arthropoda
- Clade: Pancrustacea
- Class: Insecta
- Order: Lepidoptera
- Family: Depressariidae
- Genus: Cryptolechia
- Species: C. pateropa

Binomial name
- Cryptolechia pateropa Meyrick, 1931

Species of moth

Cryptolechia pateropa is a moth in the family Depressariidae. It was described by Edward Meyrick in 1931. It is found in Brazil.
