= Cryptolechia iridias =

Scientific classification
- Kingdom: Animalia
- Phylum: Arthropoda
- Clade: Pancrustacea
- Class: Insecta
- Order: Lepidoptera
- Family: Depressariidae
- Genus: Cryptolechia
- Species: C. iridias

Binomial name
- Cryptolechia iridias Meyrick, 1910

Species of moth

Cryptolechia iridias is a moth in the family Depressariidae. It was described by Edward Meyrick in 1910. It is found in India (Assam).

The wingspan is 17–21 mm. The forewings are pale yellow-ochreous, sprinkled with dark brownish, especially on the apical third. The base of the costa is suffused with dark fuscous. The stigmata is dark fuscous. The hindwings are pale shining ochreous, tinged with fuscous posteriorly.
