= Cryptolechia trimaculata =

Scientific classification
- Kingdom: Animalia
- Phylum: Arthropoda
- Clade: Pancrustacea
- Class: Insecta
- Order: Lepidoptera
- Family: Depressariidae
- Genus: Cryptolechia
- Species: C. trimaculata

Binomial name
- Cryptolechia trimaculata Wang, 2006

Species of moth

Cryptolechia trimaculata is a moth in the family Depressariidae. It was described by Wang in 2006. It is found in Fujian, China.

The length of the forewings is about 15 mm. The forewings are brown. The hindwings are grey.
