= Cryptolechia diplosticha =

Scientific classification
- Kingdom: Animalia
- Phylum: Arthropoda
- Clade: Pancrustacea
- Class: Insecta
- Order: Lepidoptera
- Family: Depressariidae
- Genus: Cryptolechia
- Species: C. diplosticha

Binomial name
- Cryptolechia diplosticha Meyrick, 1926

Species of moth

Cryptolechia diplosticha is a moth in the family Depressariidae. It was described by Edward Meyrick in 1926. It is found in Colombia.

The wingspan is about 24 mm. The forewings are pale greyish-ochreous sprinkled with fuscous and partially suffused with light fuscous. The veins are pale, tending to be edged with fuscous lines and there is a short blackish dash near the base towards the costa. The stigmata is small, dark fuscous, the plical rather obliquely beyond the first discal. There are undefined irregular fuscous spots towards the costa before and beyond the middle, and in disc between these. There are also two posterior angulated series of suffused dark fuscous spots, between veins two and five less marked and obscured by a darker suffusion of ground colour. There is a marginal series of dark fuscous marks around the posterior part of the costa and termen. The hindwings are rather dark grey.
