= Cryptolechia anticrossa =

Scientific classification
- Kingdom: Animalia
- Phylum: Arthropoda
- Clade: Pancrustacea
- Class: Insecta
- Order: Lepidoptera
- Family: Depressariidae
- Genus: Cryptolechia
- Species: C. anticrossa

Binomial name
- Cryptolechia anticrossa Meyrick, 1915

Species of moth

Cryptolechia anticrossa is a moth in the family Depressariidae. It was described by Edward Meyrick in 1915. It is found in Australia, where it has been recorded from Queensland.

The wingspan is about 20 mm. The forewings are pale fuscous suffused with white on the margins and sprinkled with dark fuscous. There are strong subcostal and subdorsal streaks of dark fuscous suffusion from the base to two-thirds of the wing and a similar streak beginning in disc at one-third and expanded beyond the cell into a patch occupying the apical area except a white marginal streak barred with dark fuscous. The hindwings are pale grey, whitish-tinged towards the base.
