= Cryptolechia veniflua =

Scientific classification
- Kingdom: Animalia
- Phylum: Arthropoda
- Clade: Pancrustacea
- Class: Insecta
- Order: Lepidoptera
- Family: Depressariidae
- Genus: Cryptolechia
- Species: C. veniflua

Binomial name
- Cryptolechia veniflua Meyrick, 1914

Species of moth

Cryptolechia veniflua is a moth in the family Depressariidae. It was described by Edward Meyrick in 1914. It is found in Colombia.

The wingspan is 34–36 mm. The forewings are light yellow-ochreous, sprinkled with brownish. There is an irregular band of brown suffusion from the base of the costa running above the cell to an irregular brown spot nearly obliterating the transverse darker second discal stigma. The other stigmata is small, dark brown, plical obliquely beyond the first discal. There is some irregular brown suffusion along the dorsum and an angulated subterminal series of pale dots more or less indicated, sometimes edged with brown dots. There is also a series of dark brown dots around the posterior part of the costa and termen. The hindwings are pale fuscous tinged with ochreous, somewhat darker posteriorly.
