= Allotalanta deceptrix =

Scientific classification
- Kingdom: Animalia
- Phylum: Arthropoda
- Class: Insecta
- Order: Lepidoptera
- Family: Cosmopterigidae
- Genus: Allotalanta
- Species: A. deceptrix

Binomial name
- Allotalanta deceptrix Meyrick, 1925

Species of moth

Allotalanta deceptrix is a moth in the family Cosmopterigidae. It was described by Edward Meyrick in 1925 and is found in Liaoning, China.
