= Cryptolechia remotella =

Scientific classification
- Kingdom: Animalia
- Phylum: Arthropoda
- Clade: Pancrustacea
- Class: Insecta
- Order: Lepidoptera
- Family: Depressariidae
- Genus: Cryptolechia
- Species: C. remotella

Binomial name
- Cryptolechia remotella (Staudinger, 1899)

Synonyms
- Depressaria remotella Staudinger, 1899

Species of moth

Cryptolechia remotella is a moth in the family Depressariidae. It was described by Otto Staudinger in 1899. It is found in Patagonia.
