= Meleonoma petrota =

Scientific classification
- Kingdom: Animalia
- Phylum: Arthropoda
- Class: Insecta
- Order: Lepidoptera
- Family: Autostichidae
- Subfamily: Periacminae
- Tribe: Meleonomini
- Genus: Meleonoma
- Species: M. petrota

Binomial name
- Meleonoma petrota Meyrick, 1914

Species of moth

Meleonoma petrota is a moth in the family Cosmopterigidae. It is found in Sri Lanka.
