= Cryptolechia citrodeta =

Scientific classification
- Kingdom: Animalia
- Phylum: Arthropoda
- Clade: Pancrustacea
- Class: Insecta
- Order: Lepidoptera
- Family: Depressariidae
- Genus: Cryptolechia
- Species: C. citrodeta

Binomial name
- Cryptolechia citrodeta Meyrick, 1921

Species of moth

Cryptolechia citrodeta is a moth in the family Depressariidae. It was described by Edward Meyrick in 1921. It is found in Brazil.

The wingspan is 12–13 mm. The forewings are violet-grey with a whitish-yellow costal streak throughout and an irregular terminal line. The hindwings are grey.
