= Meleonoma aridula =

Scientific classification
- Kingdom: Animalia
- Phylum: Arthropoda
- Class: Insecta
- Order: Lepidoptera
- Family: Autostichidae
- Subfamily: Periacminae
- Tribe: Meleonomini
- Genus: Meleonoma
- Species: M. aridula

Binomial name
- Meleonoma aridula (Meyrick, 1910)

Synonyms
- Cryptolechia aridula Meyrick, 1910

Species of moth

Meleonoma aridula is a moth in the family Cosmopterigidae. It is found on Borneo.
