= Allotalanta oporista =

Scientific classification
- Kingdom: Animalia
- Phylum: Arthropoda
- Class: Insecta
- Order: Lepidoptera
- Family: Cosmopterigidae
- Genus: Allotalanta
- Species: A. oporista

Binomial name
- Allotalanta oporista Meyrick, 1926

Species of moth

Allotalanta oporista is a moth in the family Cosmopterigidae. It was described by Edward Meyrick in 1926. It is found in New Ireland.
