= Cryptolechia bifida =

Scientific classification
- Kingdom: Animalia
- Phylum: Arthropoda
- Clade: Pancrustacea
- Class: Insecta
- Order: Lepidoptera
- Family: Depressariidae
- Genus: Cryptolechia
- Species: C. bifida

Binomial name
- Cryptolechia bifida Wang, 2006

Species of moth

Cryptolechia bifida is a moth in the family Depressariidae. It was described by Wang in 2006. It is found in China (Guangxi).

The length of the forewings is 12–13 mm. The forewings are dark brown and its hindwings are grey.

== Etymology ==
The specific name refers to the shape of the uncus and is derived from Latin bifidus (meaning split in two).
