= Cryptolechia rostriformis =

Scientific classification
- Kingdom: Animalia
- Phylum: Arthropoda
- Clade: Pancrustacea
- Class: Insecta
- Order: Lepidoptera
- Family: Depressariidae
- Genus: Cryptolechia
- Species: C. rostriformis

Binomial name
- Cryptolechia rostriformis Wang, 2006

Species of moth

Cryptolechia rostriformis is a moth in the family Depressariidae. It was described by Wang in 2006. It is found in Fujian, China.

The length of the forewings is 16–17.5 mm. The forewings are black. The hindwings are black.

== Etymology ==
The specific name refers to the shape of the uncus and is derived from Latin rostriform (shaped like a beak).
