= Cryptolechia similifloralis =

Scientific classification
- Kingdom: Animalia
- Phylum: Arthropoda
- Clade: Pancrustacea
- Class: Insecta
- Order: Lepidoptera
- Family: Depressariidae
- Genus: Cryptolechia
- Species: C. similifloralis

Binomial name
- Cryptolechia similifloralis Wang, 2006

Species of moth

Cryptolechia similifloralis is a moth in the family Depressariidae. It was described by Wang in 2006. It is found in the Chinese provinces of Hubei and Sichuan.

The length of the forewings is about 12 mm.

== Etymology ==
The specific name refers to the flowerlike distal part of aedeagus and is derived from Latin simil- (meaning similar) and floralis (meaning flower).
