= Cryptolechia dorsoprojecta =

Scientific classification
- Kingdom: Animalia
- Phylum: Arthropoda
- Clade: Pancrustacea
- Class: Insecta
- Order: Lepidoptera
- Family: Depressariidae
- Genus: Cryptolechia
- Species: C. dorsoprojecta

Binomial name
- Cryptolechia dorsoprojecta Wang, 2006

Species of moth

Cryptolechia dorsoprojecta is a moth in the family Depressariidae. It was described by Wang in 2006. It is found in Fujian, China.

The length of the forewings is 15–16 mm.

== Etymology ==
The species name refers to the large dorsal process of the sacculus and is derived from Latin dorso- (meaning dorsal) and projectus (meaning prominent).
