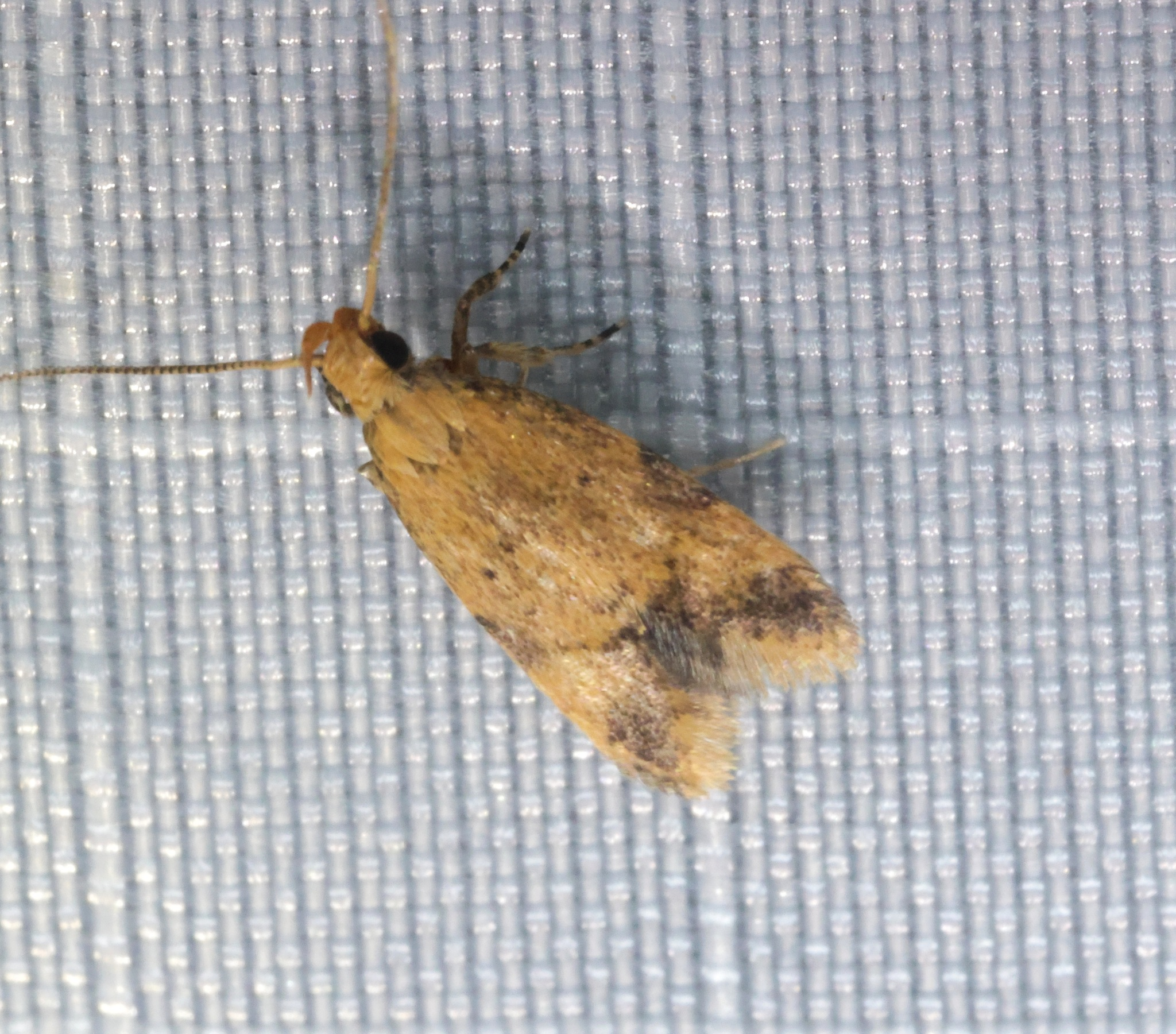

Scientific classification
- Kingdom: Animalia
- Phylum: Arthropoda
- Clade: Pancrustacea
- Class: Insecta
- Order: Lepidoptera
- Family: Autostichidae
- Subfamily: Periacminae
- Tribe: Meleonomini
- Genus: Meleonoma
- Species: M. facialis

Binomial name
- Meleonoma facialis H.H. Li & S.X. Wang, 2002

= Meleonoma facialis =

Species of moth

Meleonoma facialis, is a moth in the family Autostichidae. It is found in China (Shaanxi).
