= Cryptolechia mellispersa =

Scientific classification
- Kingdom: Animalia
- Phylum: Arthropoda
- Clade: Pancrustacea
- Class: Insecta
- Order: Lepidoptera
- Family: Depressariidae
- Genus: Cryptolechia
- Species: C. mellispersa

Binomial name
- Cryptolechia mellispersa Diakonoff, 1952

Species of moth

Cryptolechia mellispersa is a moth in the family Depressariidae. It was described by Alexey Diakonoff in 1952. It is found in Burma.
