= Cryptolechia zeloxantha =

Scientific classification
- Kingdom: Animalia
- Phylum: Arthropoda
- Clade: Pancrustacea
- Class: Insecta
- Order: Lepidoptera
- Family: Depressariidae
- Genus: Cryptolechia
- Species: C. zeloxantha

Binomial name
- Cryptolechia zeloxantha Meyrick, 1934

Species of moth

Cryptolechia zeloxantha is a moth in the family Depressariidae. It was described by Edward Meyrick in 1934. It is found in China (Sichuan).
