= Cryptolechia robusta =

Scientific classification
- Kingdom: Animalia
- Phylum: Arthropoda
- Clade: Pancrustacea
- Class: Insecta
- Order: Lepidoptera
- Family: Depressariidae
- Genus: Cryptolechia
- Species: C. robusta

Binomial name
- Cryptolechia robusta Wang, 2006

Species of moth

Cryptolechia robusta is a moth in the family Depressariidae. It was described by Wang in 2006. It is found in Hubei, China.

== Etymology ==
The species name refers to the aedeagus and is derived from Latin robustus (meaning stout).
