= Cryptolechia phoebas =

Scientific classification
- Kingdom: Animalia
- Phylum: Arthropoda
- Clade: Pancrustacea
- Class: Insecta
- Order: Lepidoptera
- Family: Depressariidae
- Genus: Cryptolechia
- Species: C. phoebas

Binomial name
- Cryptolechia phoebas (Meyrick, 1907)

Synonyms
- Eulechria phoebas Meyrick, 1907; Leptosaces phoebas

Species of moth

Cryptolechia phoebas is a moth in the family Depressariidae. It was described by Edward Meyrick in 1907. It is found in India (Assam) and Bhutan.

The wingspan is 15–16 mm. The forewings are deep ochreous-yellow, posteriorly slightly brownish-tinged, the base of the costa narrowly dark fuscous. The stigmata is black, the plical obliquely beyond the first discal. There is a small additional black dot beneath the second discal. The hindwings are grey.
