= Cryptolechia sciodeta =

Scientific classification
- Kingdom: Animalia
- Phylum: Arthropoda
- Clade: Pancrustacea
- Class: Insecta
- Order: Lepidoptera
- Family: Depressariidae
- Genus: Cryptolechia
- Species: C. sciodeta

Binomial name
- Cryptolechia sciodeta Meyrick, 1930

Species of moth

Cryptolechia sciodeta is a moth in the family Depressariidae. It was described by Edward Meyrick in 1930. It is found in Brazil.

The wingspan is about 16 mm.
