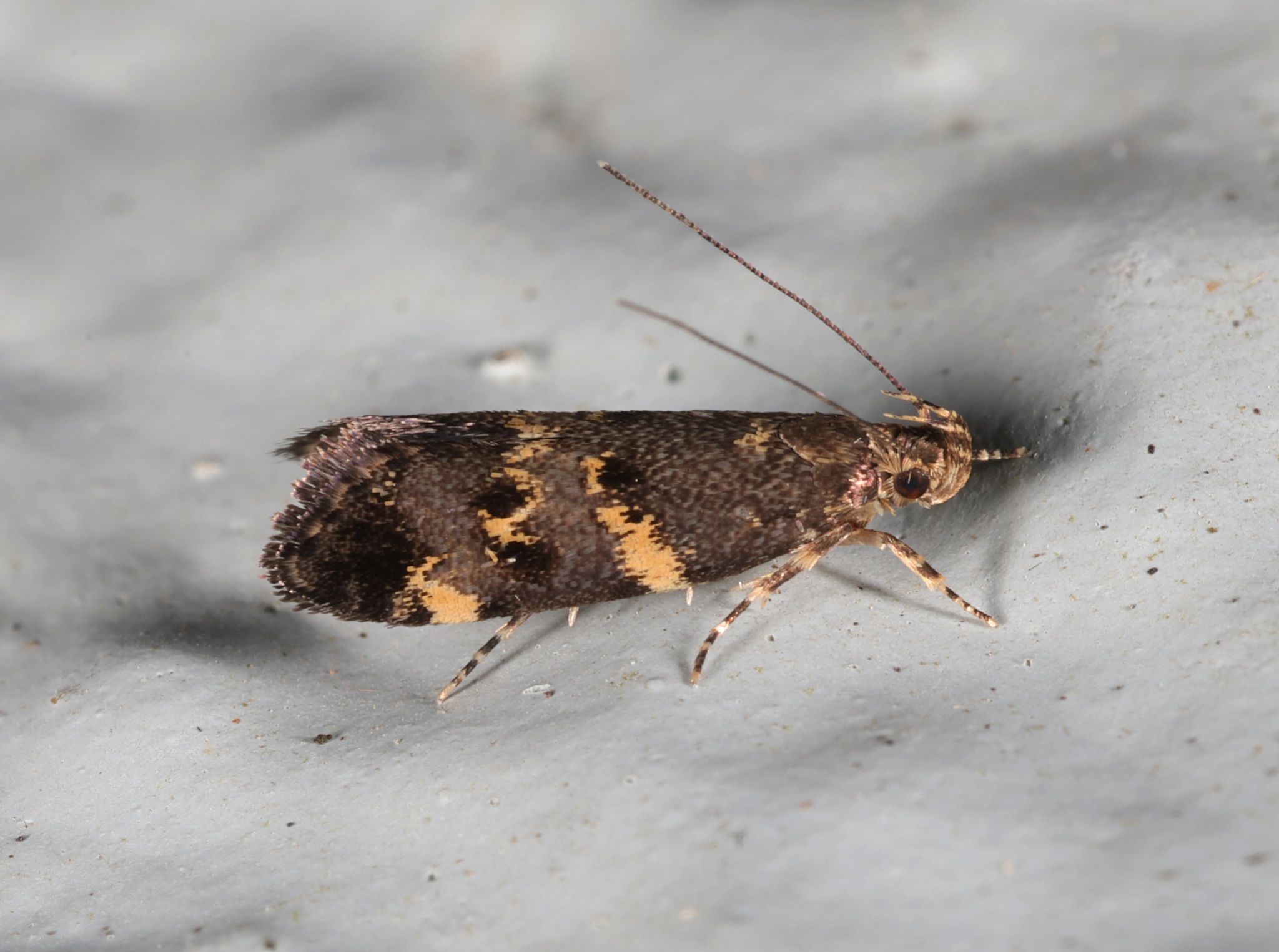

Scientific classification
- Kingdom: Animalia
- Phylum: Arthropoda
- Class: Insecta
- Order: Lepidoptera
- Family: Autostichidae
- Subfamily: Periacminae
- Tribe: Meleonomini
- Genus: Meleonoma
- Species: M. flavilineata

Binomial name
- Meleonoma flavilineata Kitajima & Sakamaki, 2019

= Meleonoma flavilineata =

Species of moth

Meleonoma flavilineata is a moth in the family Autostichidae. It is found in Japan.
