= Cryptolechia mataea =

Scientific classification
- Kingdom: Animalia
- Phylum: Arthropoda
- Clade: Pancrustacea
- Class: Insecta
- Order: Lepidoptera
- Family: Depressariidae
- Genus: Cryptolechia
- Species: C. mataea

Binomial name
- Cryptolechia mataea (Meyrick, 1910)

Synonyms
- Leptosaces mataea Meyrick, 1910

Species of moth

Cryptolechia mataea is a moth in the family Depressariidae. It was described by Edward Meyrick in 1910. It is found in southern India.

The wingspan is 15–17 mm. The forewings are whitish ochreous yellow and the hindwings are grey.
