= Cryptolechia bifoliolata =

Scientific classification
- Kingdom: Animalia
- Phylum: Arthropoda
- Clade: Pancrustacea
- Class: Insecta
- Order: Lepidoptera
- Family: Depressariidae
- Genus: Cryptolechia
- Species: C. bifoliolata

Binomial name
- Cryptolechia bifoliolata Wang, 2006

Species of moth

Cryptolechia bifoliolata is a moth in the family Depressariidae. It was described by Wang in 2006. It is found in Fujian, China.

The length of the forewings is about 16.5 mm. The forewings are greyish black with a yellow spot at the costal half and at three-fourths and the tornus. The hindwings are brown.

== Etymology ==
The specific name refers to the distal shape of the uncus and is derived from Latin bifoliolatus (meaning bilobed).
