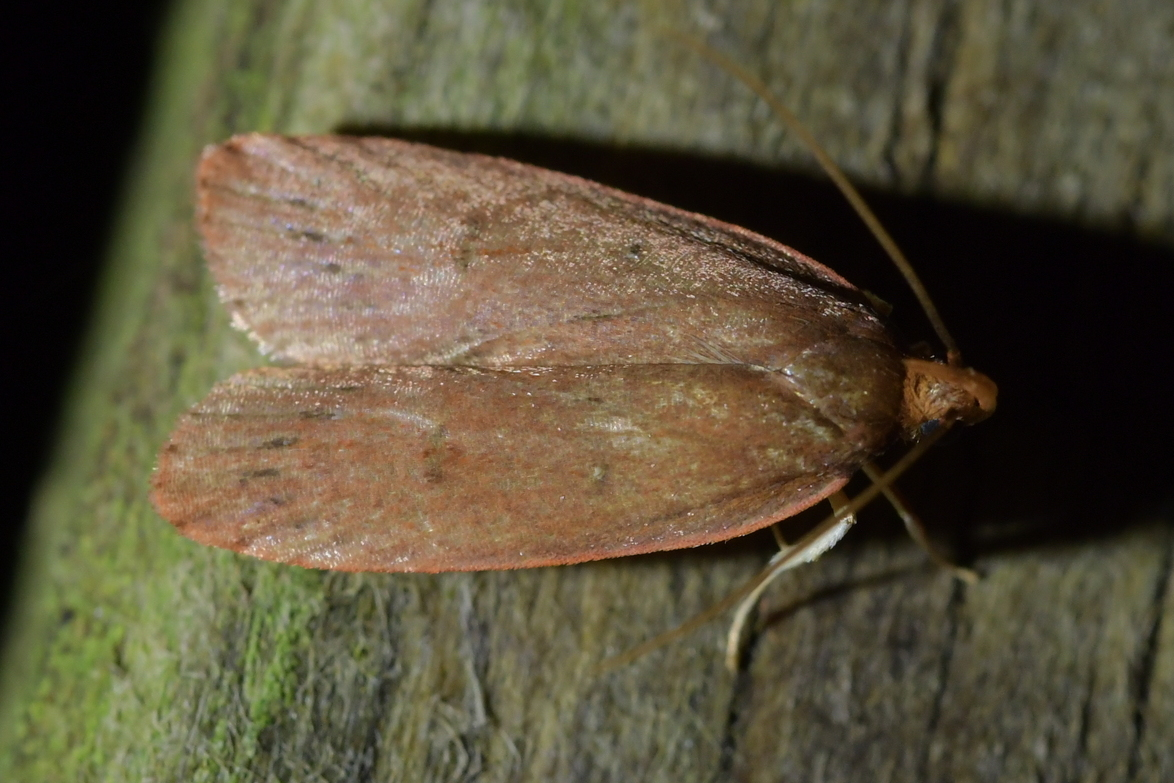

Scientific classification
- Kingdom: Animalia
- Phylum: Arthropoda
- Clade: Pancrustacea
- Class: Insecta
- Order: Lepidoptera
- Family: Depressariidae
- Genus: Cryptolechia
- Species: C. rhodobapta

Binomial name
- Cryptolechia rhodobapta Meyrick, 1923

= Cryptolechia rhodobapta =

Species of moth

Cryptolechia rhodobapta is a moth in the family Depressariidae. It is endemic to New Zealand.

== Taxonomy ==
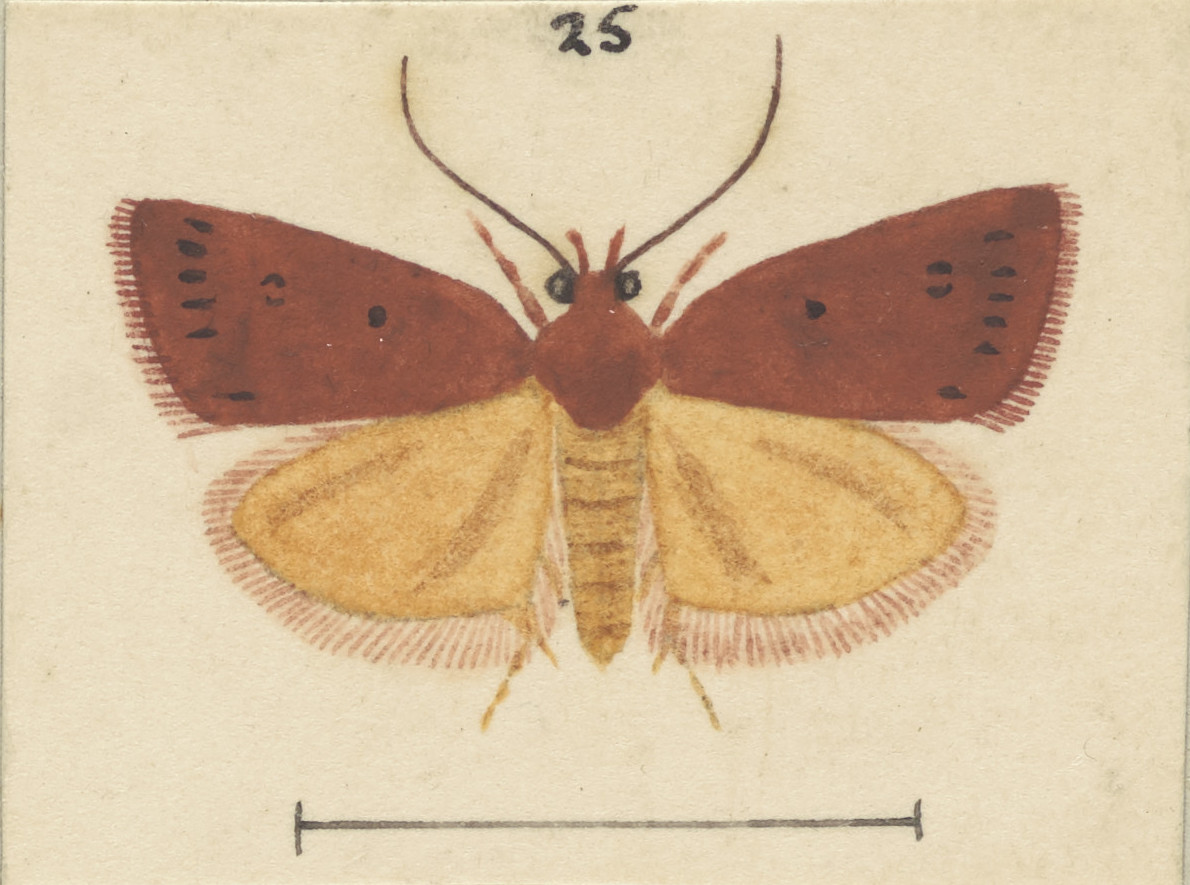
Painting of Cryptolechia rhodobapta by George Hudson

This species was described by Edward Meyrick in 1923 using a male specimen collected in Takapuna, Auckland in January. This species was discussed and illustrated under this name by George Hudson in his 1928 book The Butterflies and Moths of New Zealand. However the placement of this species within the genus Cryptolechia is in doubt. As a result, this species has also been referred to as Cryptolechia (s.l.) rhodobapta. The holotype specimen is held at the Natural History Museum, London.

== Description ==
The wingspan is about 19 mm. The forewings are rosy-lilac-brownish, with the costal edge ferruginous. The stigmata are small, indistinct and dark fuscous, the plical beneath the first discal. There is an obtusely angulated subterminal series of indistinct short interneural dark-fuscous dashes. The hindwings are light grey.

== Distribution ==
This species is endemic to New Zealand.
