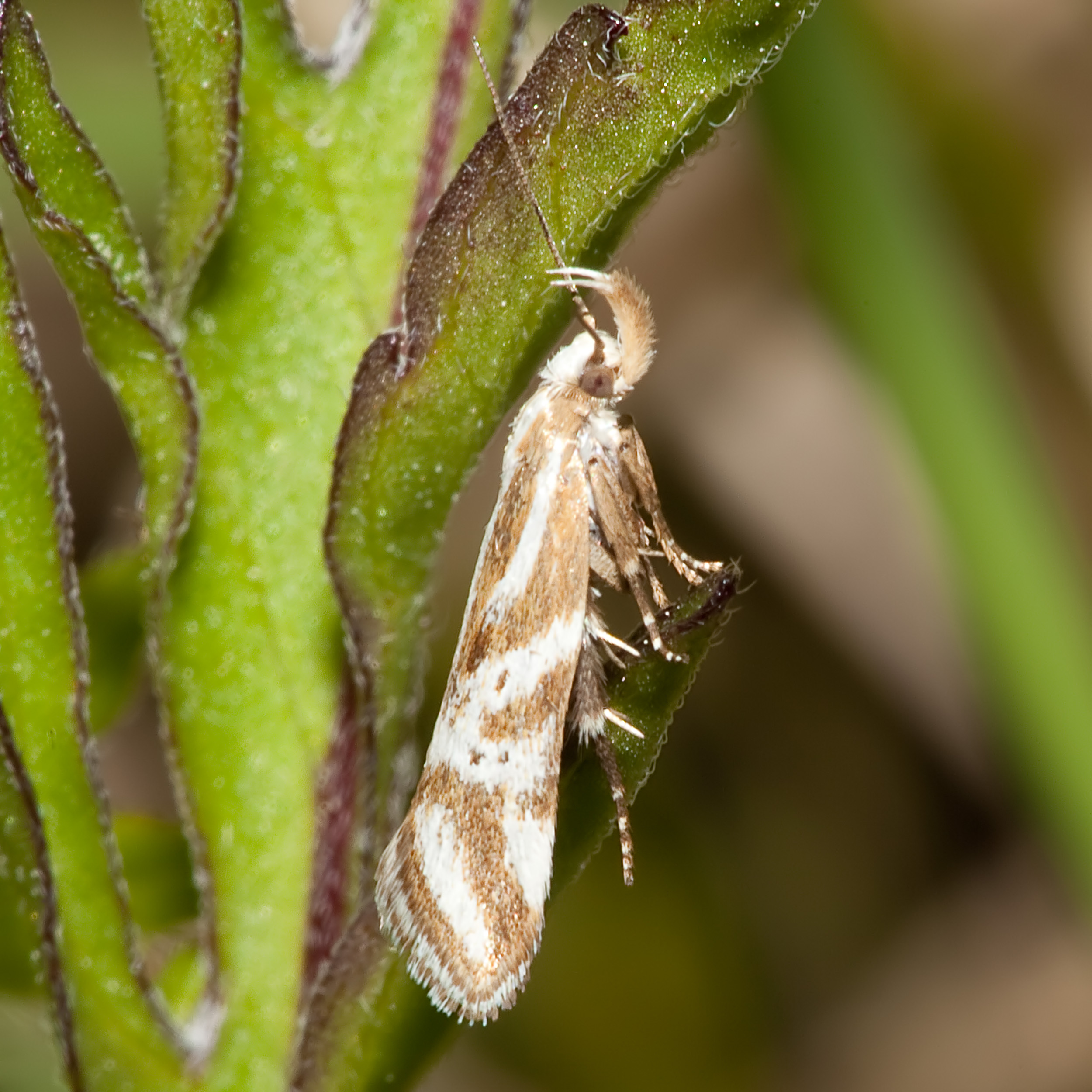
- Orophia denisella

Scientific classification
- Kingdom: Animalia
- Phylum: Arthropoda
- Clade: Pancrustacea
- Class: Insecta
- Order: Lepidoptera
- Family: Depressariidae
- Subfamily: Cryptolechiinae; Meyrick, 1883

Synonyms
- Cryptolechiidae Meyrick, 1883; Cryptolechiini; Orophiinae Lvovsky, 1974 (preocc. Thomson, 1863); Orophiini Lvovsky, 1974; Cacochroini Leraut, 1993

= Cryptolechiinae =

Subfamily of moths

The Cryptolechiinae are a subfamily of small moths in the family Depressariidae.

== Taxonomy and systematics ==
- Acryptolechia Lvovsky, 2010
- Cryptolechia Zeller, 1852
- Orophia Hübner, [1825]
- Cacochroa Heinemann, 1870
