= Cryptolechia vespertina =

Scientific classification
- Kingdom: Animalia
- Phylum: Arthropoda
- Clade: Pancrustacea
- Class: Insecta
- Order: Lepidoptera
- Family: Depressariidae
- Genus: Cryptolechia
- Species: C. vespertina

Binomial name
- Cryptolechia vespertina Meyrick, 1910

Species of moth

Cryptolechia vespertina is a moth in the family Depressariidae. It was described by Edward Meyrick in 1910. It is found in China (Fujian, Sichuan, Zhejiang), Taiwan and India.

The wingspan is 17–20 mm. The forewings are dark purplish fuscous, sprinkled with blackish. The stigmata is large, cloudy and blackish. The hindwings of the males are whitish ochreous, suffused with grey towards the termen. The hindwings of the females are grey, but paler towards the base and suffused with whitish ochreous along the costa anteriorly.
