= Cacochroa permixtella =

Scientific classification
- Kingdom: Animalia
- Phylum: Arthropoda
- Clade: Pancrustacea
- Class: Insecta
- Order: Lepidoptera
- Family: Depressariidae
- Genus: Cacochroa
- Species: C. permixtella

Binomial name
- Cacochroa permixtella (Herrich-Schäffer, 1854)

Species of moth

Cacochroa permixtella is a moth of the family Depressariidae. It is found in the Mediterranean Region.

== Biology ==
The caterpillars feed on Phillyrea angustifolia and Phillyrea latifolia. After overwintering in the larval stage, the larvae live freely in a rolled leaf.

== Taxonomy ==
Junior synonyms are:

- Anchinia permixtella Herrich-Schaffer 1854
- Cacophyia permixtella (Herrich-Schäffer, 1854)
