= Cryptolechia ichnitis =

Scientific classification
- Kingdom: Animalia
- Phylum: Arthropoda
- Clade: Pancrustacea
- Class: Insecta
- Order: Lepidoptera
- Family: Depressariidae
- Genus: Cryptolechia
- Species: C. ichnitis

Binomial name
- Cryptolechia ichnitis Meyrick, 1918

Species of moth

Cryptolechia ichnitis is a moth in the family Depressariidae. It was described by Edward Meyrick in 1918. It is found in French Guiana.

The wingspan is about 20 mm. The forewings are pale whitish-ochreous, the costa towards the base tinged with fuscous. There is a small blackish triangular basal spot and a small blackish mark beneath and beyond this. The stigmata is blackish, the plical obliquely beyond the first discal, the second discal larger, preceded by a small spot confluent with it. There is a blackish subcostal dot above the first discal stigma and there is some faint fuscous suffusion on the costa before and beyond the middle, and above the dorsum at two-fifths. There are two posterior parallel transverse series of undefined cloudy spots of faint fuscous suffusion, strongly excurved on the upper two-thirds, as well as a marginal series of cloudy dark fuscous dots around the posterior part of the costa and termen. The hindwings are whitish.
