= Cryptolechia bibundella =

Scientific classification
- Kingdom: Animalia
- Phylum: Arthropoda
- Clade: Pancrustacea
- Class: Insecta
- Order: Lepidoptera
- Family: Depressariidae
- Genus: Cryptolechia
- Species: C. bibundella

Binomial name
- Cryptolechia bibundella (Strand, 1913)

Synonyms
- Apiletria bibundella Strand, 1913

Species of moth

Cryptolechia bibundella is a moth in the family Depressariidae. It was described by Strand in 1913. It is found in Cameroon.
