= Cryptolechia eningiella =

Scientific classification
- Kingdom: Animalia
- Phylum: Arthropoda
- Clade: Pancrustacea
- Class: Insecta
- Order: Lepidoptera
- Family: Depressariidae
- Genus: Cryptolechia
- Species: C. eningiella

Binomial name
- Cryptolechia eningiella Plötz, 1880

Species of moth

Cryptolechia eningiella is a moth in the family Depressariidae. It was described by Plötz in 1880. It is found in Gabon.
