= Cryptolechia perversa =

Scientific classification
- Kingdom: Animalia
- Phylum: Arthropoda
- Clade: Pancrustacea
- Class: Insecta
- Order: Lepidoptera
- Family: Depressariidae
- Genus: Cryptolechia
- Species: C. perversa

Binomial name
- Cryptolechia perversa Meyrick, 1918

Species of moth

Cryptolechia perversa is a moth in the family Depressariidae. It was described by Edward Meyrick in 1918. It is found in southern India.

The wingspan is about 13 mm. The forewings are fuscous, irrorated with dark fuscous. The stigmata is cloudy, dark fuscous, and edged with whitish posteriorly, the plical rather obliquely beyond the first discal, and there are ochreous-whitish spots on the costa before the middle and at four-fifths. The hindwings are light grey.
