= Allotalanta clonomicta =

Scientific classification
- Kingdom: Animalia
- Phylum: Arthropoda
- Class: Insecta
- Order: Lepidoptera
- Family: Cosmopterigidae
- Genus: Allotalanta
- Species: A. clonomicta

Binomial name
- Allotalanta clonomicta Meyrick, 1927

Species of moth

Allotalanta clonomicta is a moth in the family Cosmopterigidae. It was described by Edward Meyrick in 1927. It is found in South Africa.
