= Cryptolechia castella =

Scientific classification
- Kingdom: Animalia
- Phylum: Arthropoda
- Clade: Pancrustacea
- Class: Insecta
- Order: Lepidoptera
- Family: Depressariidae
- Genus: Cryptolechia
- Species: C. castella

Binomial name
- Cryptolechia castella Zeller, 1852

Synonyms
- Epiphractis castella Zeller, 1852

Species of moth

Cryptolechia castella is a moth in the family Depressariidae. It was described by Philipp Christoph Zeller in 1852. It is found in South Africa.
