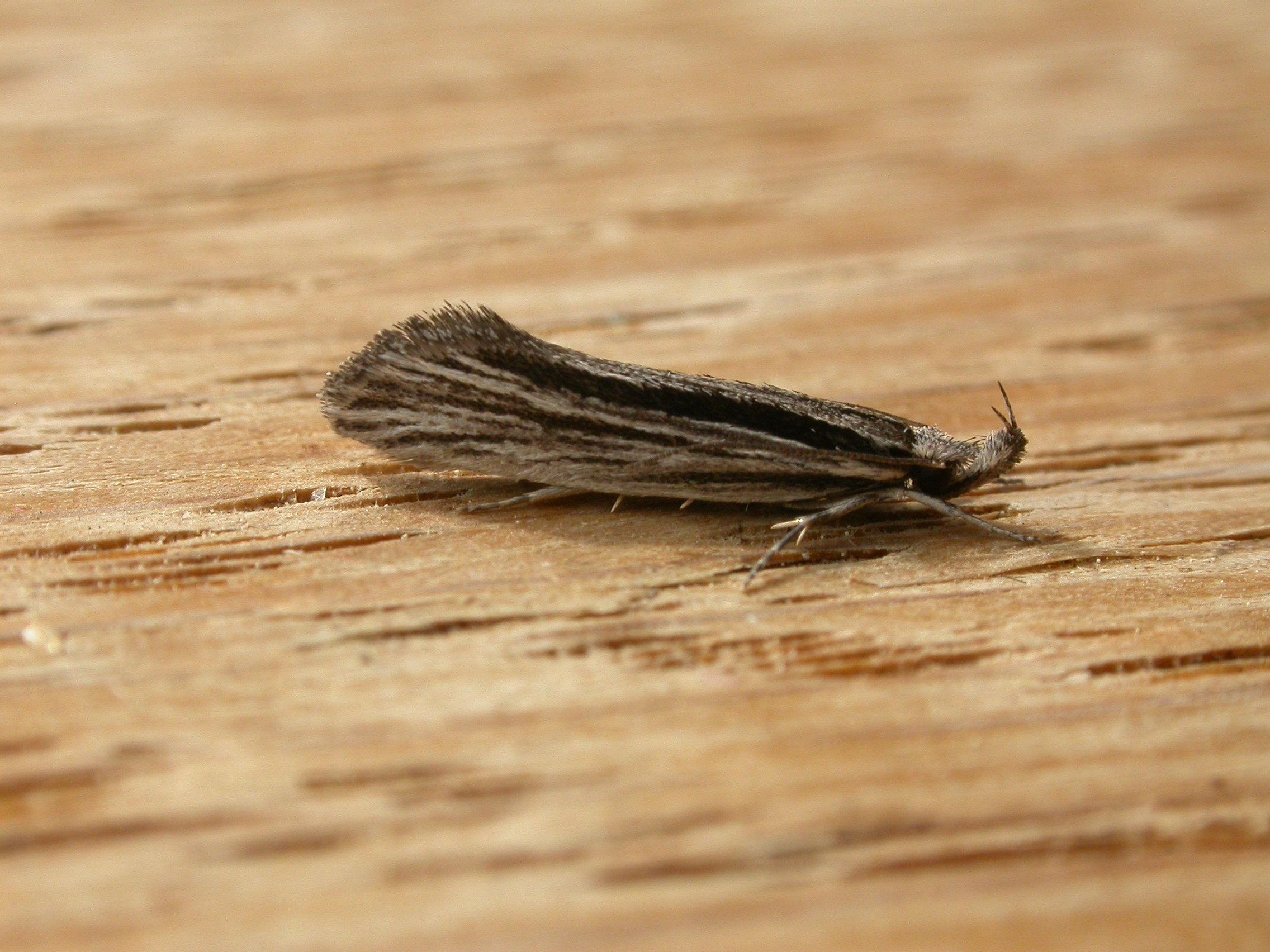

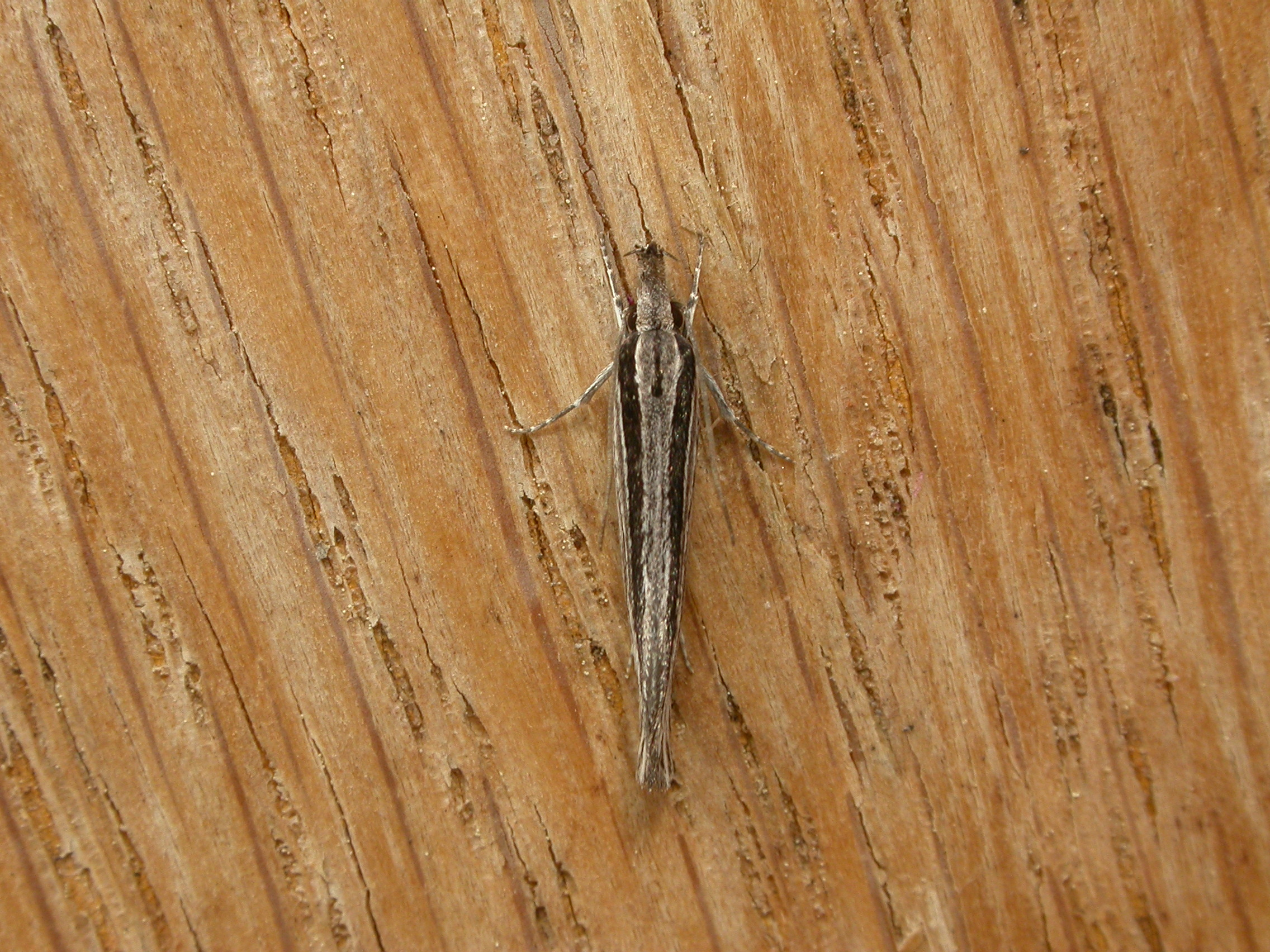

Scientific classification
- Kingdom: Animalia
- Phylum: Arthropoda
- Clade: Pancrustacea
- Class: Insecta
- Order: Lepidoptera
- Family: Depressariidae
- Genus: Cryptolechia
- Species: C. schistopa

Binomial name
- Cryptolechia schistopa (Meyrick, 1902)

Synonyms
- Leptosaces schistopa Meyrick, 1902

= Cryptolechia schistopa =

Species of moth

Cryptolechia schistopa is a moth of the family Depressariidae. It is found in Australia, where it has been recorded from New South Wales, Queensland and Victoria.

The wingspan is 13–18 mm. The forewings are whitish, somewhat mixed with fuscous, coarsely and irregularly streaked with blackish-fuscous between veins and there is a blackish-fuscous median longitudinal streak from the base to the termen, as well as a stronger blackish-fuscous subdorsal streak to the base to the tornus. The hindwings are fuscous, lighter anteriorly.
