= Cryptolechia laica =

Scientific classification
- Kingdom: Animalia
- Phylum: Arthropoda
- Clade: Pancrustacea
- Class: Insecta
- Order: Lepidoptera
- Family: Depressariidae
- Genus: Cryptolechia
- Species: C. laica

Binomial name
- Cryptolechia laica Meyrick, 1910

Species of moth

Cryptolechia laica is a moth in the family Depressariidae. It was described by Edward Meyrick in 1910. It is found on Borneo.

The wingspan is about 16 mm. The forewings are brownish ochreous, sprinkled with dark fuscous. The base of the costa is suffused with dark fuscous. The stigmata are dark fuscous, the first discal rather large, the plical rather obliquely beyond the first discal, an additional dot beneath the second discal. There is a series of dark fuscous dots along the posterior half of the costa and termen. The hindwings are fuscous.
