= Meleonoma stomota =

Scientific classification
- Kingdom: Animalia
- Phylum: Arthropoda
- Class: Insecta
- Order: Lepidoptera
- Family: Autostichidae
- Subfamily: Periacminae
- Tribe: Meleonomini
- Genus: Meleonoma
- Species: M. stomota

Binomial name
- Meleonoma stomota (Meyrick, 1910)

Synonyms
- Cryptolechia stomota Meyrick, 1910

Species of moth

Meleonoma stomota is a moth in the family Cosmopterigidae. It is found in India and Sri Lanka.
