= Cryptolechia municipalis =

Scientific classification
- Kingdom: Animalia
- Phylum: Arthropoda
- Clade: Pancrustacea
- Class: Insecta
- Order: Lepidoptera
- Family: Depressariidae
- Genus: Cryptolechia
- Species: C. municipalis

Binomial name
- Cryptolechia municipalis Meyrick, 1920

Species of moth

Cryptolechia municipalis is a moth in the family Depressariidae. It was described by Edward Meyrick in 1920. It is found in Australia, where it has been recorded from Queensland.

The wingspan is about 13 mm. The forewings are light greyish-ochreous irrorated fuscous, the costa suffused are dark fuscous towards the base. The stigmata is dark fuscous, the plical hardly before the first discal, the second discal forming a small transverse spot. There is a marginal series of cloudy dark fuscous dots around the apex and termen. The hindwings are whitish-grey.
