= Cryptolechia metacentra =

Scientific classification
- Kingdom: Animalia
- Phylum: Arthropoda
- Clade: Pancrustacea
- Class: Insecta
- Order: Lepidoptera
- Family: Depressariidae
- Genus: Cryptolechia
- Species: C. metacentra

Binomial name
- Cryptolechia metacentra Meyrick, 1914

Species of moth

Cryptolechia metacentra is a moth in the family Depressariidae. It was described by Edward Meyrick in 1914. It is found in Taiwan.
