= Cryptolechia anticentra =

Scientific classification
- Kingdom: Animalia
- Phylum: Arthropoda
- Clade: Pancrustacea
- Class: Insecta
- Order: Lepidoptera
- Family: Depressariidae
- Genus: Cryptolechia
- Species: C. anticentra

Binomial name
- Cryptolechia anticentra (Meyrick, 1910)

Synonyms
- Leptosaces anticentra Meyrick, 1910

Species of moth

Cryptolechia anticentra is a moth in the family Depressariidae. It was described by Edward Meyrick in 1910. It is found in India (Assam).

The wingspan is 13–14 mm. The forewings are deep ochreous-yellow, sprinkled with dark fuscous and with the base of the costa suffused with dark fuscous. The stigmata is dark fuscous, with the plical beyond the first discal and the second discal merged in a narrow dark fuscous fascia running from a triangular costal spot at two-thirds to the tornus, where it unites with a dark fuscous terminal fascia. The hindwings are grey in both sexes, but darker in females.
