= Allotalanta ochthotoma =

Scientific classification
- Kingdom: Animalia
- Phylum: Arthropoda
- Class: Insecta
- Order: Lepidoptera
- Family: Cosmopterigidae
- Genus: Allotalanta
- Species: A. ochthotoma

Binomial name
- Allotalanta ochthotoma Meyrick, 1930

Species of moth

Allotalanta ochthotoma is a moth in the family Cosmopterigidae. It was described by Edward Meyrick in 1930. It is found in Cameroon.
