= Cryptolechia tetraspilella =

Scientific classification
- Kingdom: Animalia
- Phylum: Arthropoda
- Clade: Pancrustacea
- Class: Insecta
- Order: Lepidoptera
- Family: Depressariidae
- Genus: Cryptolechia
- Species: C. tetraspilella

Binomial name
- Cryptolechia tetraspilella (Walker, 1864)

Synonyms
- Gelechia tetraspilella Walker, 1864; Cryptolechia dochaea Meyrick, 1910

Species of moth

Cryptolechia tetraspilella is a moth in the family Depressariidae. It was described by Francis Walker in 1864. It is found in Sri Lanka.

The wingspan is 14–20 mm. The forewings are pale greyish ochreous, sometimes tinged with brownish and sprinkled with dark fuscous. The stigmata is blackish and there is a terminal series of small dark fuscous dots. The hindwings are light grey.
