= Allotalanta spilothyris =

Scientific classification
- Kingdom: Animalia
- Phylum: Arthropoda
- Class: Insecta
- Order: Lepidoptera
- Family: Cosmopterigidae
- Genus: Allotalanta
- Species: A. spilothyris

Binomial name
- Allotalanta spilothyris Meyrick, 1922

Species of moth

Allotalanta spilothyris is a moth in the family Cosmopterigidae. It was described by Edward Meyrick in 1922. It is found in India (Assam).
