= Cacochroa corfuella =

Scientific classification
- Kingdom: Animalia
- Phylum: Arthropoda
- Clade: Pancrustacea
- Class: Insecta
- Order: Lepidoptera
- Family: Depressariidae
- Genus: Cacochroa
- Species: C. corfuella

Binomial name
- Cacochroa corfuella Lvovsky, 2000

Species of moth

Cacochroa corfuella is a moth of the family Depressariidae. It is found in Greece (it was described from Corfu).
