= Cryptolechia pytinaea =

Scientific classification
- Kingdom: Animalia
- Phylum: Arthropoda
- Clade: Pancrustacea
- Class: Insecta
- Order: Lepidoptera
- Family: Depressariidae
- Genus: Cryptolechia
- Species: C. pytinaea

Binomial name
- Cryptolechia pytinaea (Meyrick, 1902)

Synonyms
- Leptosaces pytinaea Meyrick, 1902

Species of moth

Cryptolechia pytinaea is a moth in the family Depressariidae. It was described by Edward Meyrick in 1902. It is found in Australia, where it has been recorded from New South Wales.

The wingspan is 18–19 mm. The termen of the forewings is fuscous between the veins and there is a thicker subcostal streak from the base to beneath the middle of the costa and one in the disc from one-fifth to two-thirds. There is a stronger blackish-fuscous subdorsal streak from the base to the tornus. The hindwings are ochreous-grey-whitish.
