= Cryptolechia gypsochra =

Scientific classification
- Kingdom: Animalia
- Phylum: Arthropoda
- Clade: Pancrustacea
- Class: Insecta
- Order: Lepidoptera
- Family: Depressariidae
- Genus: Cryptolechia
- Species: C. gypsochra

Binomial name
- Cryptolechia gypsochra Meyrick, 1938

Species of moth

Cryptolechia gypsochra is a moth in the family Depressariidae. It was described by Edward Meyrick in 1938. It is found in Yunnan, China.
