= Cryptolechia aganopis =

Scientific classification
- Kingdom: Animalia
- Phylum: Arthropoda
- Clade: Pancrustacea
- Class: Insecta
- Order: Lepidoptera
- Family: Depressariidae
- Genus: Cryptolechia
- Species: C. aganopis

Binomial name
- Cryptolechia aganopis (Meyrick, 1905)

Synonyms
- Phaeosaces aganopis Meyrick, 1905

Species of moth

Cryptolechia aganopis is a moth in the family Depressariidae. It was described by Edward Meyrick in 1905. It is found in Sri Lanka.

The wingspan is 15–19 mm for males and 19–26 mm for females. The forewings are light brown, slightly ferruginous tinged, with a few scattered dark fuscous scales. The stigmata is dark fuscous. The hindwings are pale fuscous, tinged with whitish-ochreous anteriorly, darker towards the apex.
