= Cryptolechia luniformis =

Scientific classification
- Kingdom: Animalia
- Phylum: Arthropoda
- Clade: Pancrustacea
- Class: Insecta
- Order: Lepidoptera
- Family: Depressariidae
- Genus: Cryptolechia
- Species: C. luniformis

Binomial name
- Cryptolechia luniformis Wang, 2006

Species of moth

Cryptolechia luniformis is a moth in the family Depressariidae. It was described by Wang in 2006. It is found in Guangdong, China.

The length of the forewings is 12–13 mm. The forewings are dark brown. The hindwings are grey.
