= Allotalanta synclera =

Scientific classification
- Kingdom: Animalia
- Phylum: Arthropoda
- Class: Insecta
- Order: Lepidoptera
- Family: Cosmopterigidae
- Genus: Allotalanta
- Species: A. synclera

Binomial name
- Allotalanta synclera (Meyrick, 1921)

Synonyms
- Cryptolechia synclera Meyrick, 1921

Species of moth

Allotalanta synclera is a moth in the family Cosmopterigidae. It was described by Edward Meyrick in 1921. It is found in India (Kanara).

The wingspan is about 22 mm (0.87 in). The forewings are rather dark fuscous, darker and purplish-tinged towards the base. The hindwings are light grey, paler and thinly scaled towards the base and the veins darker. There is a small oval hyaline spot beneath the cell near the base.
