= Meleonoma facunda =

Scientific classification
- Kingdom: Animalia
- Phylum: Arthropoda
- Class: Insecta
- Order: Lepidoptera
- Family: Autostichidae
- Subfamily: Periacminae
- Tribe: Meleonomini
- Genus: Meleonoma
- Species: M. facunda

Binomial name
- Meleonoma facunda (Meyrick, 1910)

Synonyms
- Acryptolechia facunda (Meyrick, 1910); Leptosaces facunda Meyrick, 1910; Cryptolechia facunda

Species of moth

Meleonoma facunda is a moth in the family Depressariidae. It was described by Edward Meyrick in 1910. It is found in Japan, northern and eastern China and Assam, India.

The wingspan is 11–12 mm. The forewings are deep ochreous yellow, with a streak of dark fuscous irroration (sprinkling) along the basal third of the costa. The stigmata is blackish and the plical is found before the first discal and there is an additional dot beneath the second discal, as well as a spot of dark fuscous suffusion on the middle of the costa, reaching the second discal stigma. There is a moderately broad rather dark fuscous terminal fascia. The hindwings are grey.
