= Meleonoma crocomitra =

Scientific classification
- Kingdom: Animalia
- Phylum: Arthropoda
- Class: Insecta
- Order: Lepidoptera
- Family: Autostichidae
- Tribe: Meleonomini
- Genus: Meleonoma
- Species: M. crocomitra

Binomial name
- Meleonoma crocomitra (Meyrick, 1914)

Synonyms
- Allotalanta crocomitra (Meyrick, 1914); Pseudodoxia crocomitra Meyrick, 1914

Species of moths

Meleonoma crocomitra is a species in the moth family Autostichidae, found in Kanara, India.
