= Meleonoma malacobyrsa =

Scientific classification
- Kingdom: Animalia
- Phylum: Arthropoda
- Class: Insecta
- Order: Lepidoptera
- Family: Autostichidae
- Subfamily: Periacminae
- Tribe: Meleonomini
- Genus: Meleonoma
- Species: M. malacobyrsa

Binomial name
- Meleonoma malacobyrsa (Meyrick, 1921)

Synonyms
- Acryptolechia malacobyrsa (Meyrick, 1921); Cryptolechia malacobyrsa Meyrick, 1921; Depressaria bicinctella Matsumura, 1931

Species of moth

Meleonoma malacobyrsa is a moth in the family Depressariidae. It was described by Edward Meyrick in 1921. It is found in Japan, Korea, China (Fujian, Henan, Jiangxi, Shaanxi, Sichuan) and Taiwan.

The wingspan is about 19 mm. The forewings are deep yellow-ochreous, sprinkled rather dark purplish-fuscous and with some purplish-fuscous suffusion towards the dorsum anteriorly. There is an oblique oval purplish-fuscous spot representing the first discal stigma and a somewhat oblique slender purplish-fuscous fascia from beyond the middle of the costa to the dorsum before the tornus. There is a marginal series of small purplish-fuscous spots around the posterior part of the costa and termen. The hindwings are grey, paler towards the base.
