= Cryptolechia straminella =

Scientific classification
- Kingdom: Animalia
- Phylum: Arthropoda
- Clade: Pancrustacea
- Class: Insecta
- Order: Lepidoptera
- Family: Depressariidae
- Genus: Cryptolechia
- Species: C. straminella

Binomial name
- Cryptolechia straminella Zeller, 1852

Species of moth

Cryptolechia straminella is a moth in the family Depressariidae. It was described by Philipp Christoph Zeller in 1852. It is found in South Africa.
