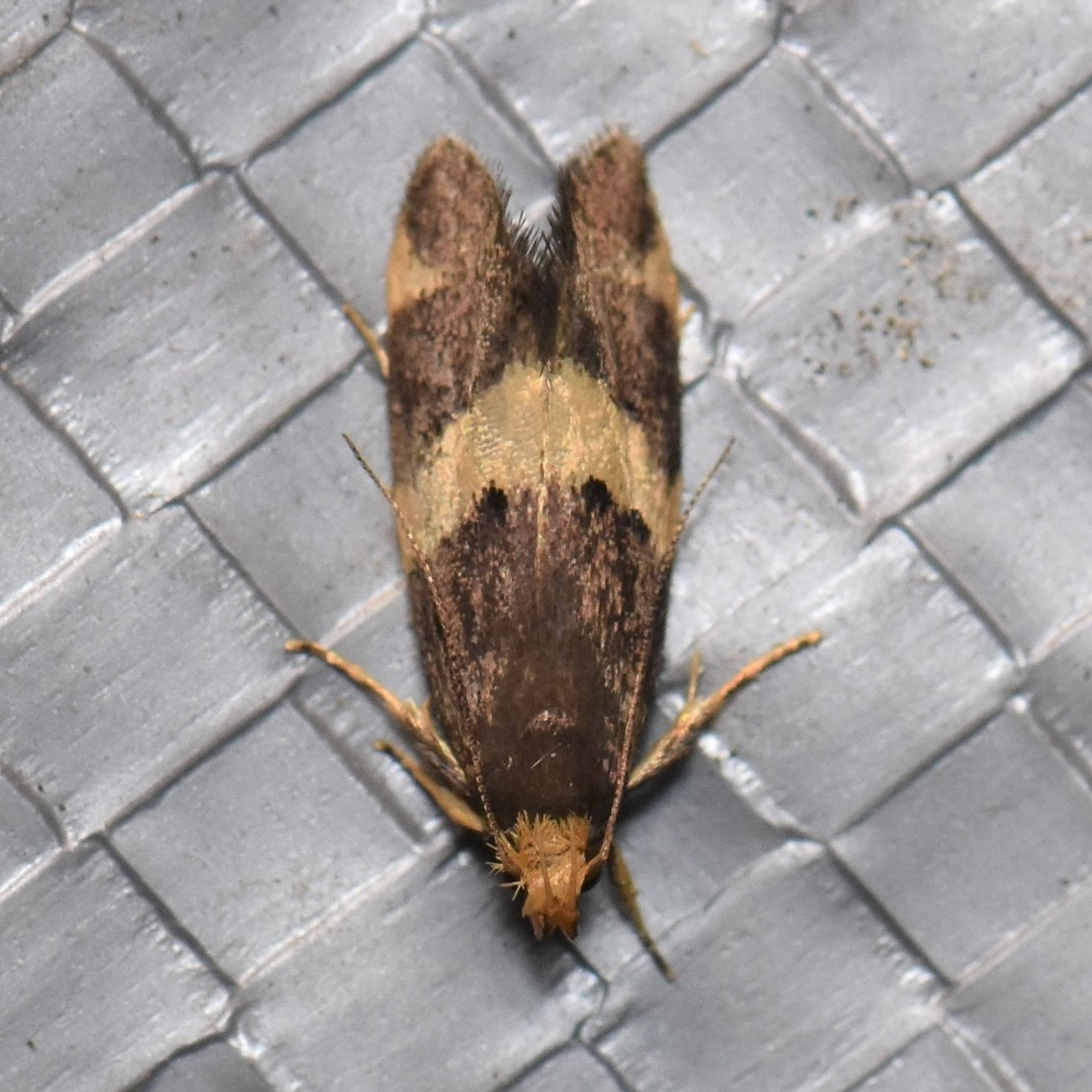

Scientific classification
- Kingdom: Animalia
- Phylum: Arthropoda
- Class: Insecta
- Order: Lepidoptera
- Family: Autostichidae
- Subfamily: Periacminae
- Tribe: Meleonomini
- Genus: Meleonoma
- Species: M. torophanes

Binomial name
- Meleonoma torophanes (Meyrick, 1935)

Synonyms
- Acryptolechia torophanes (Meyrick, 1935); Cryptolechia torophanes Meyrick, 1935

= Meleonoma torophanes =

Species of moth

Meleonoma torophanes is a species of moth in the family Depressariidae. It was first described by Edward Meyrick in 1935. It is found in China (Henan, Shaanxi, Zhejiang, Hubei) and Korea.
