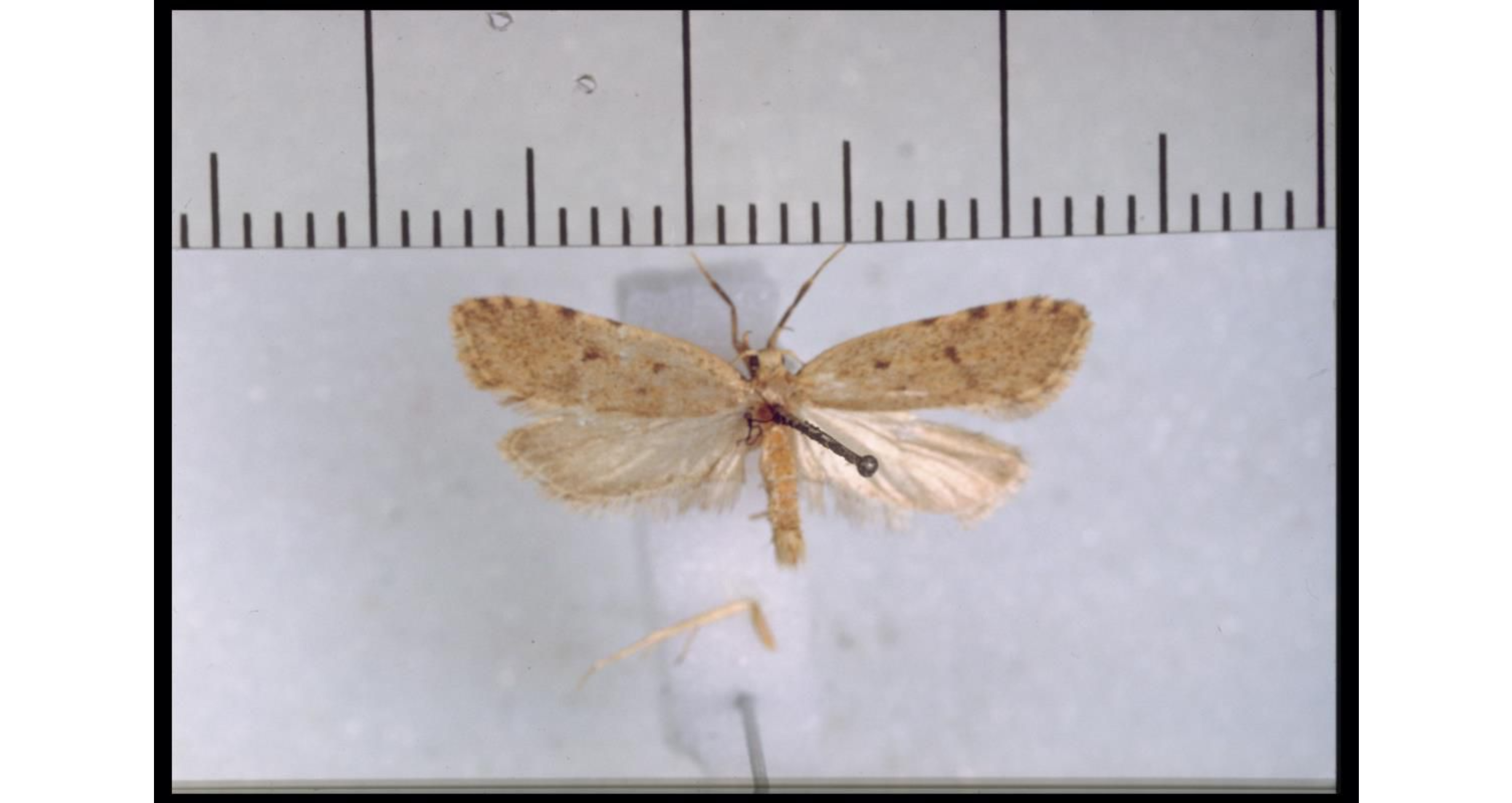

Scientific classification
- Kingdom: Animalia
- Phylum: Arthropoda
- Clade: Pancrustacea
- Class: Insecta
- Order: Lepidoptera
- Family: Oecophoridae
- Genus: Gymnobathra
- Species: G. primaria

Binomial name
- Gymnobathra primaria Philpott, 1928

= Gymnobathra primaria =

Species of moth endemic to New Zealand

Gymnobathra primaria is a moth in the family Oecophoridae. It was first described by Alfred Philpott in 1928. It is endemic to New Zealand. It has been hypothesised that this species likely belongs to another genus.

== Description ==
Philpott described this species as follows:

♂. 19–21 mm. Head ochreous. Palpi and thorax ochreous mixed with fuscous. Antennae ochreous mixed with fuscous, finely serrulate, ciliations 1. Abdomen brassy, anal tuft ochreous. Legs whitish-ochreous, more or less infuscated, anterior pairs almost wholly fuscous. Forewings, costa well arched, apex obtuse, termen rounded, oblique; greyish-ochreous sprinkled with fuscous-black; markings fuscous-black; a small spot on base of costa continued for a short distance along costal edge; first discal spot fairly large; plical obliquely beyond first discal, small; second discal as large as first discal, usually slightly elongated in direction of tornus; five or six spots on costa between ½ and apex: fringes greyish-ochreous with obscure subbasal fuscous line. Hindwings whitish-grey, infuscated round termen and dorsum: fringes ochreous-grey with dark basal line.

Philpott pointed out that this species is very similar in appearance to Gymnobathra levigata and Gymnobathra inadequa but that this species is the largest of the three.

== Behaviour ==
This species is on the wing between December and February.
