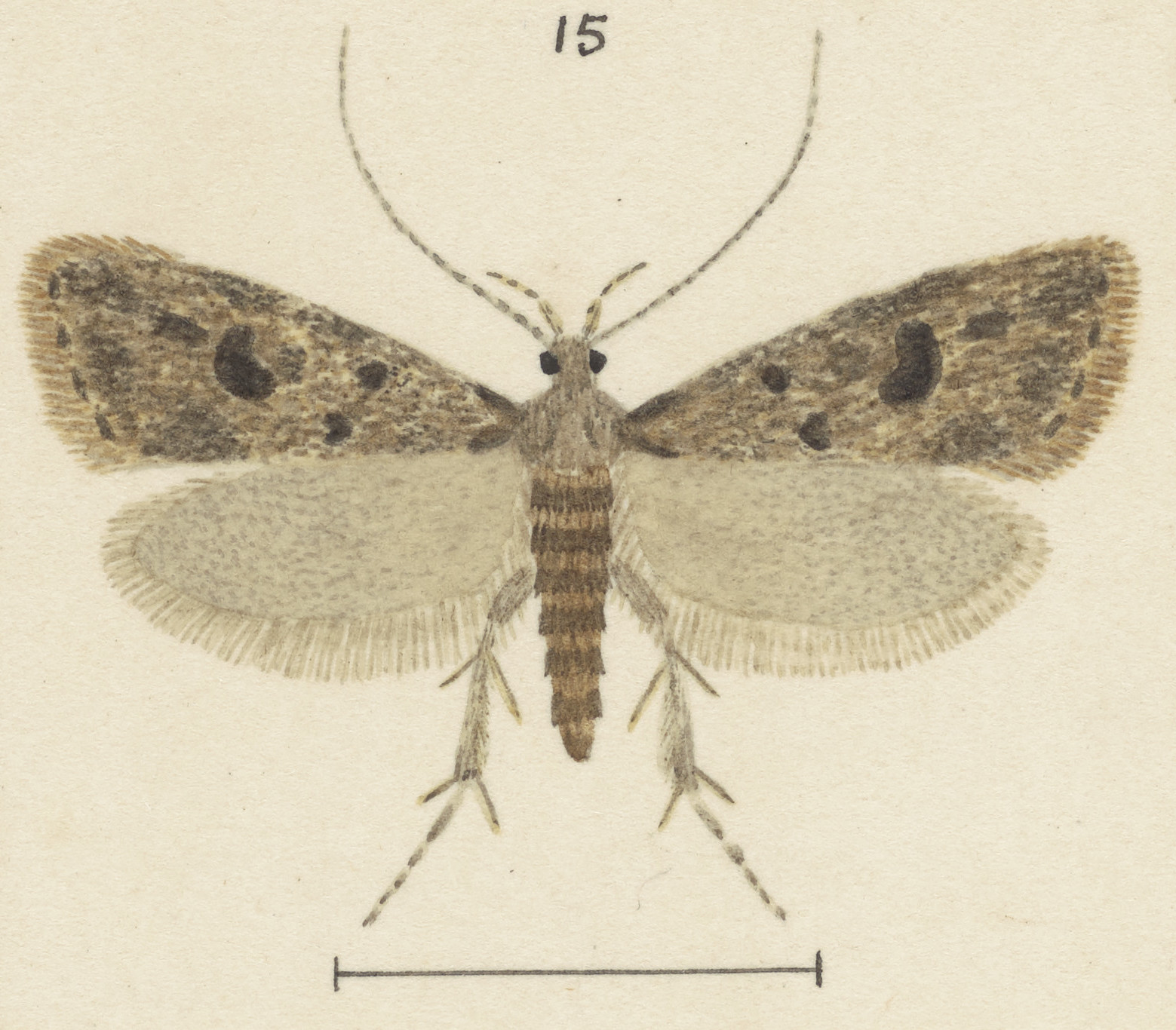

Conservation status
- Nationally Critical (NZ TCS)

Scientific classification
- Kingdom: Animalia
- Phylum: Arthropoda
- Clade: Pancrustacea
- Class: Insecta
- Order: Lepidoptera
- Family: Oecophoridae
- Genus: Gymnobathra
- Species: G. ambigua

Binomial name
- Gymnobathra ambigua (Philpott, 1926)

Synonyms
- Barea ambigua Philpott, 1926

= Gymnobathra ambigua =

Species of moth

Gymnobathra ambigua is a species of moth in the family Oecophoridae. It is endemic to New Zealand. It was first described in 1926. This species has been classified as critically endangered by the Department of Conservation.

== Taxonomy ==
This species was first described by Alfred Philpott in 1926 under the name Barea ambigua using male specimens collected by Mr. W. Heighway at Horseshoe Lake, Christchurch in November and December. In 1988, John S. Dugdale assigned Barea ambigua to the genus Gymnobathra. The taxonomy of this species continues to be debated, with some experts regarding Gymnobathra ambigua as being a synonym of G. thetodes and arguing that Dugdale wrongly synonymised G. thetodes under G. dinocosma. The holotype specimen is held at the Canterbury museum.

== Distribution ==
G. ambigua is endemic to New Zealand. Specimens have been collected at Spreydon and Bottle Lake in Christchurch. The species has also been found at Riccarton Bush.

== Conservation status ==
This species has the "Nationally Critical" conservation status under the New Zealand Threat Classification System. It is regarded as sparse and data poor.
