= Gymnobathra flavidella =

Scientific classification
- Kingdom: Animalia
- Phylum: Arthropoda
- Clade: Pancrustacea
- Class: Insecta
- Order: Lepidoptera
- Family: Oecophoridae
- Genus: Gymnobathra
- Species: G. flavidella

Binomial name
- Gymnobathra flavidella (Walker, 1864)

Synonyms
- Gelechia flavidella Walker, 1864; Oecophora flavidella (Walker, 1864); Oecophora utuella Felder & Rogenhofer, 1875

Species of moth endemic to New Zealand

Gymnobathra flavidella, also known as the pink tipped yellow moth, is a species of moth in the family Oecophoridae. This species was first described by Francis Walker. It is endemic to New Zealand and is found in both the North Island and the northern half of the South Island. It inhabits native forest and other wooded areas. The larvae are wood eaters and the host plants for the larvae of this species include Brachyglottis repanda and Gahnia procera. The larvae inhabit the stems or flower heads of their host species and feed on the pith. It lives during the New Zealand winter and spring months being fully mature around November. It then pupates within its feeding burrow. Adults are on the wing from November until March and fly both during the day and at night. They are attracted to light. When at rest on the ground adults are well camouflaged as they resemble a small bright yellow fallen leaf.

== Taxonomy ==
This species was first described by Francis Walker in 1864 and originally named Gelechia flavidella. Gelechia flaνidella is the type species for Gymnobathra by subsequent designation. In 1875 Cajetan Felder and Alois Friedrich Rogenhofer, thinking they were describing a new species, named this moth Oecophora utuella. In 1883 Edward Meyrick placed this species in the genus Gymnobathra. Meyrick went on to synonymise Oecophora utuella into Gymnobathra flavidella and redescribed the species in 1884. In 1927 Alfred Philpott discussed and illustrated both the male and female genitalia of this species. George Hudson discussed and illustrated this species under the name Gymnobathra flavidella in his 1928 book The butterflies and moths of New Zealand. This placement was also confirmed by John S. Dugdale in 1988. The male holotype, collected by Daniel Bolton in Auckland, is held at the Natural History Museum, London.

== Description ==
Male and female breeding.

Similarity to yellow leaf.

The forewings of this species measure between 4.5mm and 8.5mm in length.

Hudson described the adults of the species as follows:

The expansion of the wings varies from slightly over 1/2 inch to nearly 3/4 inch. The fore-wings are bright yellow, with rosy brown markings; there is a minute mark on the costa at the base, a very indistinct costal edging and apical shading and three more or less distinct dark brown discal dots; a conspicuous triangular patch of rosy-brown is situated at the tornus, boarded towards the base with a blackish-brown line, which extends as a faint cloudy mark towards the costa. The hind-wings are white with the costal and terminal portions strongly clouded with pale rosy-brown. The cilia of all the wings are rosy-brown. In some specimens the fore-wings are more or less clouded with orange-brown and, as already indicated, there is considerable variation in size.

The larvae, when fully grown, are approximately 0.625 inches (1.59 cm) in length.

Hudson described the larva as folllows:

...the head is globose, bright shining reddish-brown; the body is elongate slender and cylindrical; the second segment is furnished with a pale ochreous dorsal plate; the third and fourth segments are slightly swollen, the remaining segments being elongate, with the divisions clearly marked. The general colour of the larva is pale ochreous, with a pale reddish-brown dorsal line, indicating the position of the alimentary canal. The whole surface of the larva is highly polished, but no warts or tubercles are visible, although such probably exist as hardened spots.

== Distribution ==
This species is endemic to New Zealand. It is common in all areas of the North Island and in the northern half of the South Island as far south as Christchurch and Franz Josef.

== Habitat and host species ==
This species inhabits native forest and wooded areas. The larvae of G. flavidella are wood eaters and feed on Brachyglottis repanda. Gahnia procera has also been recorded as a host species. This species likely has other larval host plants.

== Life cycle and behaviour ==
The larva of G. flavidella inhabits the dead or dying terminal shoots of B. repanda or the dead flower heads of G. procera and feeds on the central pith. It lives during the New Zealand winter and spring months, being full-grown about November. The larva then pupates within the burrows it creates within its host plants. Adults are on the wing from November until March and fly both during the night and the day. Adults are attracted to light.

When flying, or running about, the appearance of this moth ensures it is relatively noticeable. However when at rest on the ground with closed wings, its rosy-brown hind-wings then being hidden, it resembles a small bright yellow fallen leaf. When disturbed the moth will fall motionless onto the ground. This colouration and behaviour ensures it is well camouflaged and assists in its protection during the later summer months when the adults are most common.

== Gallery ==
Larva

Illustration of male

Side view

At rest on ground
