= Gymnobathra sarcoxantha =

Scientific classification
- Kingdom: Animalia
- Phylum: Arthropoda
- Clade: Pancrustacea
- Class: Insecta
- Order: Lepidoptera
- Family: Oecophoridae
- Genus: Gymnobathra
- Species: G. sarcoxantha

Binomial name
- Gymnobathra sarcoxantha Meyrick, 1883

Synonyms
- Gymnobathra coarctatella sensu Meyrick, non Walker

Species of moth endemic to New Zealand

Gymnobathra sarcoxantha is a moth in the family Oecophoridae. It was first described by Edward Meyrick in 1883. However the placement of this species within the genus Gymnobathra is in doubt. It is endemic to New Zealand. It has been hypothesised that G. sarcoxantha is confined southern parts of the South Island. Specimens collected from areas further north likely belong to an undescribed species that differs from G. sarcoxantha as it has darker hind wings. Larvae feed on leaf litter and create a case from which they feed. Adults of this species are nocturnal and are attracted to light. They are commonly observed on the wing in December and January.

== Taxonomy ==
This species was first described by Edward Meyrick in 1883 using specimens collected in Christchurch and Dunedin. Meyrick gave a fuller description of this species in 1884. In 1915 Meyrick confirmed the placement of this species in Gymnobathra. George Hudson discussed and illustrated this species in his 1928 book The butterflies and moths of New Zealand. In 1988 John S. Dugdale again confirmed the placement of this species in the genus Gymnobathra. However currently the placement of this species within the genus Gymnobathra is in doubt. The male lectotype, collected in reserved bush and forest in Dunedin, is held at the Natural History Museum, London.

== Description ==
G. sarcoxantha with paler ground colour.

Meyrick described the adult of this species as follows:

Male.—19-20 mm. Head, palpi, antennae, and thorax whitish-ochreous, sometimes slightly reddish-tinged. Abdomen and legs ochreous-whitish. Forewings elongate, somewhat dilated, costa gently arched, apex obtuse, hindmargin oblique, nearly straight ; whitish-ochreous, with a few scattered reddish-ochreous scales, margins sometimes partially suffused with deeper ochreous ; a reddish-ochreous or dark fuscous dot in disc at 1/3, a second, larger and oblique, at 2/3, and a third, very small, on fold very obliquely beyond first: cilia whitish-ochreous. Hindwings whitish, faintly ochreous-tinged: cilia ochreous-whitish.

The ground colour of this species can range from pale straw to a reddish brown and the forewings each usually have two dots and a small crescent shaped mark, however these markings can be faded or entirely absent. Hudson pointed out that this species is easily confused with worn or faded specimens of Phaeosaces coarctatella.

== Distribution ==
This species is endemic to New Zealand. It has been hypothesised that G. sarcoxantha is confined southern parts of the South Island. It has been suggested that specimens collected from areas further north likely belong to an undescribed species that differs from G. sarcoxantha as it has darker hind wings.

== Habitat and hosts ==
This is a lowland species that frequents native grassland and native forest. Larvae feed on leaf litter and create a case from which to feed.

== Behaviour ==
Adults of this species are nocturnal and are attracted to light. They have been collected via a mercury vapour light trap. Adults are most commonly observed on the wing in December and January.
