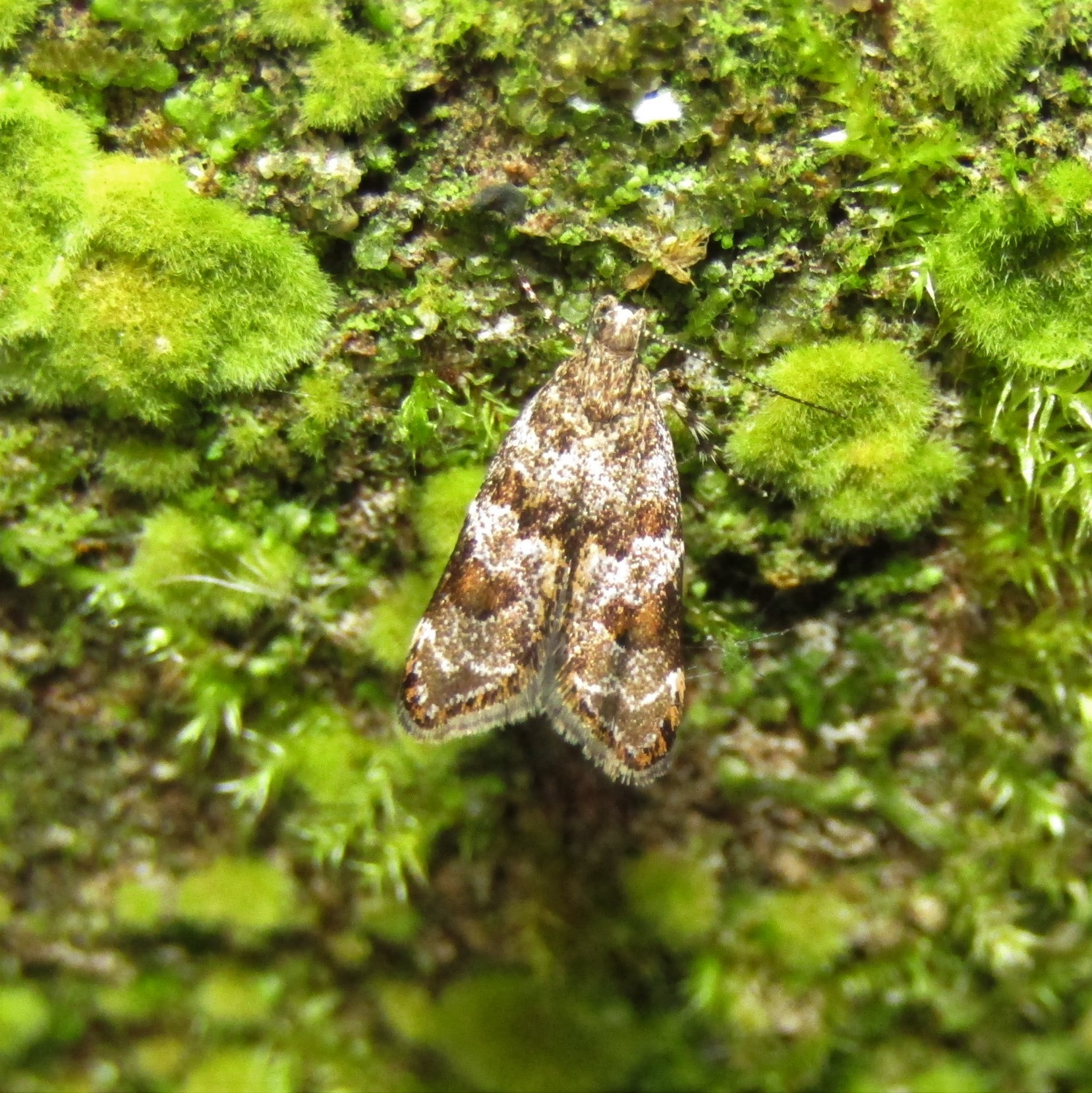

Scientific classification
- Kingdom: Animalia
- Phylum: Arthropoda
- Class: Insecta
- Order: Lepidoptera
- Family: Oecophoridae
- Genus: Gymnobathra
- Species: G. omphalota

Binomial name
- Gymnobathra omphalota Meyrick, 1888

= Gymnobathra omphalota =

Species of moth

Gymnobathra omphalota is a moth of the family Oecophoridae. It was described by Edward Meyrick in 1888. It is found in New Zealand.
