= Gymnobathra origenes =

- Male holotype

Scientific classification
- Kingdom: Animalia
- Phylum: Arthropoda
- Clade: Pancrustacea
- Class: Insecta
- Order: Lepidoptera
- Family: Oecophoridae
- Genus: Gymnobathra
- Species: G. origenes

Binomial name
- Gymnobathra origenes Meyrick, 1936

Species of moth

Gymnobathra origenes is a species of moth in the family Oecophoridae. This species is in need of taxonomic revision and it has been hypothesised that it belongs to the family Gelechiidae. The species is endemic to New Zealand. In 2025 this species was classified as "data deficient" under the New Zealand Threat Classification System. This species is known from only one specimen.

== Taxonomy ==
This species was first described by Edward Meyrick in 1936 using a specimen collected by Stewart Lindsay from Mount St Arnaud at approximately 1200m. George Hudson discussed and illustrated this species in his 1928 publication The Butterflies and Moths of New Zealand. The holotype is held at the Canterbury Museum.

The genus level classification of this species is regarded as unsatisfactory. However, as this species is only known from a single specimen that has lost its abdomen this issue is currently unresolved. As such the species is also known as Gymnobathra (s.l.) origenes. It has been hypothesised that the genus this species belongs is in the family Gelechiidae.

== Description ==
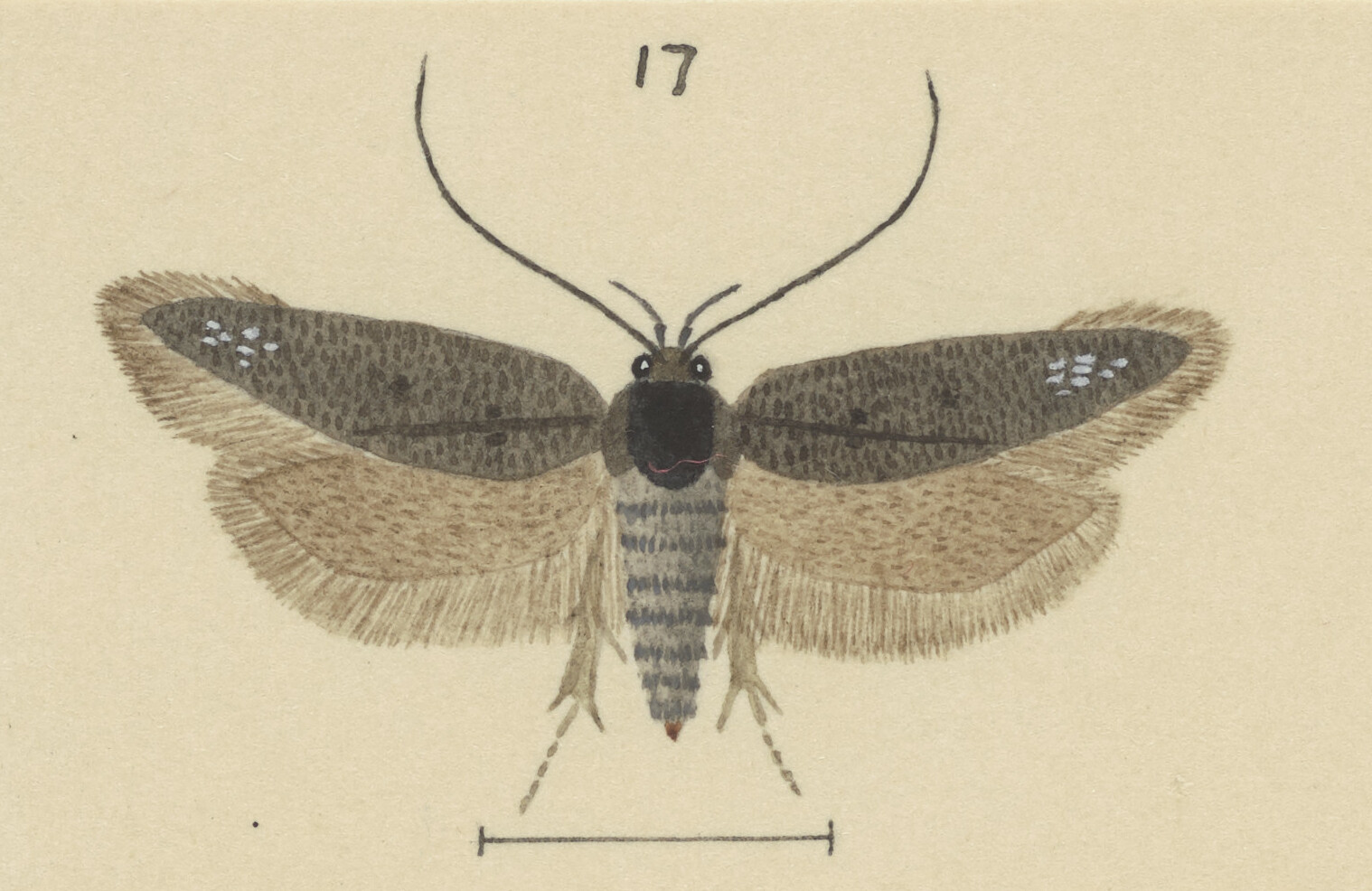
Illustration by Hudson.

Edward Meyrick described this species as follows:

♀. 12 mm. Head, thorax dark fuscous-bronze. Palpi dark fuscous. Forewings elongate, costa slightly arched, apex pointed, termen very obliquely rounded; dark bronzy-fuscous, bases of scales pale; stigmata forming small very obscure spots of dark fuscous suffusion, plical nearly beneath first discal: cilia grey, somewhat mixed bronzy-whitish. Hindwings grey; cilia light grey tinged bronzy-whitish.

== Distribution ==
G. origenes is endemic to New Zealand. It only known from the Saint Arnaud Range.

== Biology and behaviour ==
The adult moths are on the wing in December.

== Conservation status ==
In 2025 this species was classified by the New Zealand Department of Conservation as "data deficient" under the New Zealand Threat Classification System.
