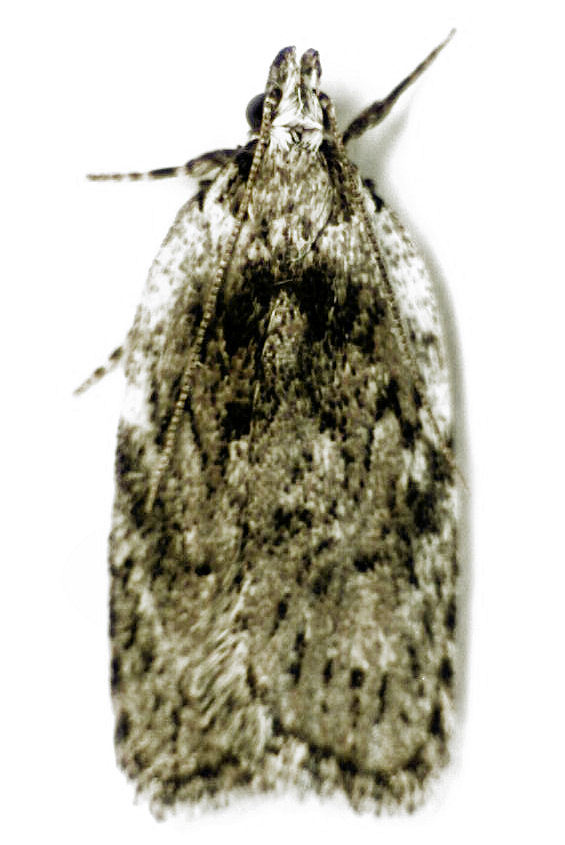
- Phaeosaces compsotypa

Scientific classification
- Kingdom: Animalia
- Phylum: Arthropoda
- Class: Insecta
- Order: Lepidoptera
- Family: Depressariidae
- Genus: Phaeosaces; Meyrick, 1885

= Phaeosaces =

Genus of moths

Phaeosaces is a genus of moths belonging to the family Depressariidae, endemic to New Zealand. It has been considered to be a synonym of Cryptolechia until reinstated as a valid genus by John S. Dugdale (1988).

== Species ==
- Phaeosaces apocrypta Meyrick, 1885
- Phaeosaces coarctatella (Walker, 1864)
- Phaeosaces compsotypa Meyrick, 1885
- Phaeosaces lindsayae (Philpott, 1928)
