= Gymnobathra tholodella =

Scientific classification
- Kingdom: Animalia
- Phylum: Arthropoda
- Clade: Pancrustacea
- Class: Insecta
- Order: Lepidoptera
- Family: Oecophoridae
- Genus: Gymnobathra
- Species: G. tholodella

Binomial name
- Gymnobathra tholodella Meyrick, 1883

Species of moth endemic to New Zealand

Gymnobathra tholodella is a species of moth in the family Oecophoridae. It was first described by Edward Meyrick in 1883 and placed in the genus Gymnobathra. However it has been hypothesised that this species likely belongs to another genus. G. tholodella is endemic to New Zealand and is found throughout the country. It is regarded as common and frequents native forest. The female moth a large number of eggs in native forest leaf litter. Once hatched, the larvae form a case from which they feed on leaf litter. Adults are on the wing from November until May and are attracted to light. Although variable in appearance adults of this species can be identified by the pale ochreous coloured cilia.

== Taxonomy ==
This species was first described by Edward Meyrick in 1883 using specimens collected at Riccarton Bush in Christchurch. Meyrick gave a more detailed description of this species in 1884. In 1927 Alfred Philpott examined the male genitalia of this species. George Hudson discussed and illustrated this species in his 1928 book The butterflies and moths of New Zealand. In 1966 John S. Dugdale discussed and illustrated the larvae of this moth. The male lectotype, collected by Meyrick in February, is held at the Natural History Museum, London. It has been hypothesised that this species likely belongs to another genus.

== Description ==
Illustration by Hudson.

Darker form.

Paler form.

Meyrick described the adults of this species as follows:

Male, female —12-13 mm. Head, palpi, and thorax light brownish-ochreous, more or less mixed and suffused with dark fuscous. Antennae brownish-ochreous, annulated or suffused with dark fuscous. Abdomen grey-whitish, anal tuft whitish-ochreous. Legs dark fuscous, central ring of anterior and middle tibie and apex of all joints whitish, posterior tibie with whitish hairs. Forewings moderate, somewhat dilated, costa moderately arched, apex obtuse, hindmargin oblique, hardly rounded; light brownish-ochreous, densely mixed and irregularly suffused with dark fuscous; generally a clear pale spot on costa before middle; a cloudy round dark fuscous dot in disc before middle, a second, oblique and sometimes obscurely double, in disc beyond middle, and a third on fold obliquely beyond first: cilia pale ochreous, with a cloudy dark fuscous line near base. Hindwings grey ; cilia pale ochreous, with a faint fuscous line.

This species does not resemble any others in the genera and the pale ochreous cilia contrast noticeably with the ground-colour on both wings. There is much variation in the density of the blackish-grey speckling on the fore-wings, as well as in the depth of the colouring of the hind-wings. In the paler forms the darker colouring is chiefly confined to the outer portions of the fore-wings, the basal and central areas being usually paler. In the darker varieties the pale ochreous cilia are very conspicuous. The dull colours of this species helps camouflage it when resting amongst leaf litter or dried and decaying plant foliage.

The larval case, from which the larvae feed, is oblong and the leaf fragments have a distinctly curved appearance.

== Distribution ==
This species is endemic to New Zealand. It found throughout the country and is regarded as being common.

== Habitat and hosts ==
G. tholodella frequents native forest. Larvae feed on leaf litter.

== Life cycle and behaviour ==
The female moth lays a large number of eggs in native forest leaf litter, with the eggs clumped together and covered in a sticky residue. The larvae create cases from which they feed. These are initially formed from frass but as the larva grows it increases the size of the case by adding leaf fragments to the case.

Adults are attracted to light. Adults are on the wing from November until May with the species being most commonly observed from January until March. When at rest the wings of this moth are tightly closed and wrapped around the body; the head is raised, the anterior and middle legs slightly extended, and the hind-wings invisible; the antennae are placed backwards along the midback, and in contact towards their tips.
