= Gymnobathra rufopunctella =

Conservation status
- Data Deficit (NZ TCS)

Scientific classification
- Kingdom: Animalia
- Phylum: Arthropoda
- Clade: Pancrustacea
- Class: Insecta
- Order: Lepidoptera
- Family: Oecophoridae
- Genus: Gymnobathra
- Species: G. rufopunctella

Binomial name
- Gymnobathra rufopunctella Hudson, 1950

Species of moth

Gymnobathra rufopunctella is a species of moth in the family Oecophoridae. This species is in need of taxonomic revision and probably belongs to a separate genus. It is endemic to New Zealand. In 2025 this species was classified as "data deficient" under the New Zealand Threat Classification System.

== Taxonomy ==
This species was first described and illustrated by George Hudson in 1950 using specimens collected by Hudson at Days Bay and Wilton's Bush in Wellington. The lectotype is held at the Museum of New Zealand Te Papa. The genus level classification of this species is regarded as unsatisfactory. It is believed that this species closely resembles some members of the Barea group of genera. As a result, the species is currently also known as Gymnobathra (s.l.) rufopunctella. As at 2025 this species is regarded as taxonomically unresolved.

== Description ==
Hudson described this species as follows:

The expansion of the wings is about 1/2 (13 mm.). The forewings are elongate-oblong, with the apex rounded and termen oblique.; deep bronzy-brown with very strong bluish-purple reflections; the whole surface is more or less sprinkled with lighter and darker scales; stigmata distinct, each formed of a small cluster of dark red scales intermixed with one or two black scales; there are very faint traces of similar clusters of scales near apex and tornus. The hindwings are bright golden-brown, heavily sprinkled with dark brown scales, especially towards apex. The cilia of all the wings are bronzy-brown, very faintly tipped with reddish.

== Distribution ==
G. rufopunctella is endemic to New Zealand. This species has been collected in Wellington.

== Biology and behaviour ==
The adult moths are on the wing in November and December. The species prefers forest habitat.

== Conservation status ==
In 2025 this species was classified by the New Zealand Department of Conservation as "data deficient" under the New Zealand Threat Classification System.
