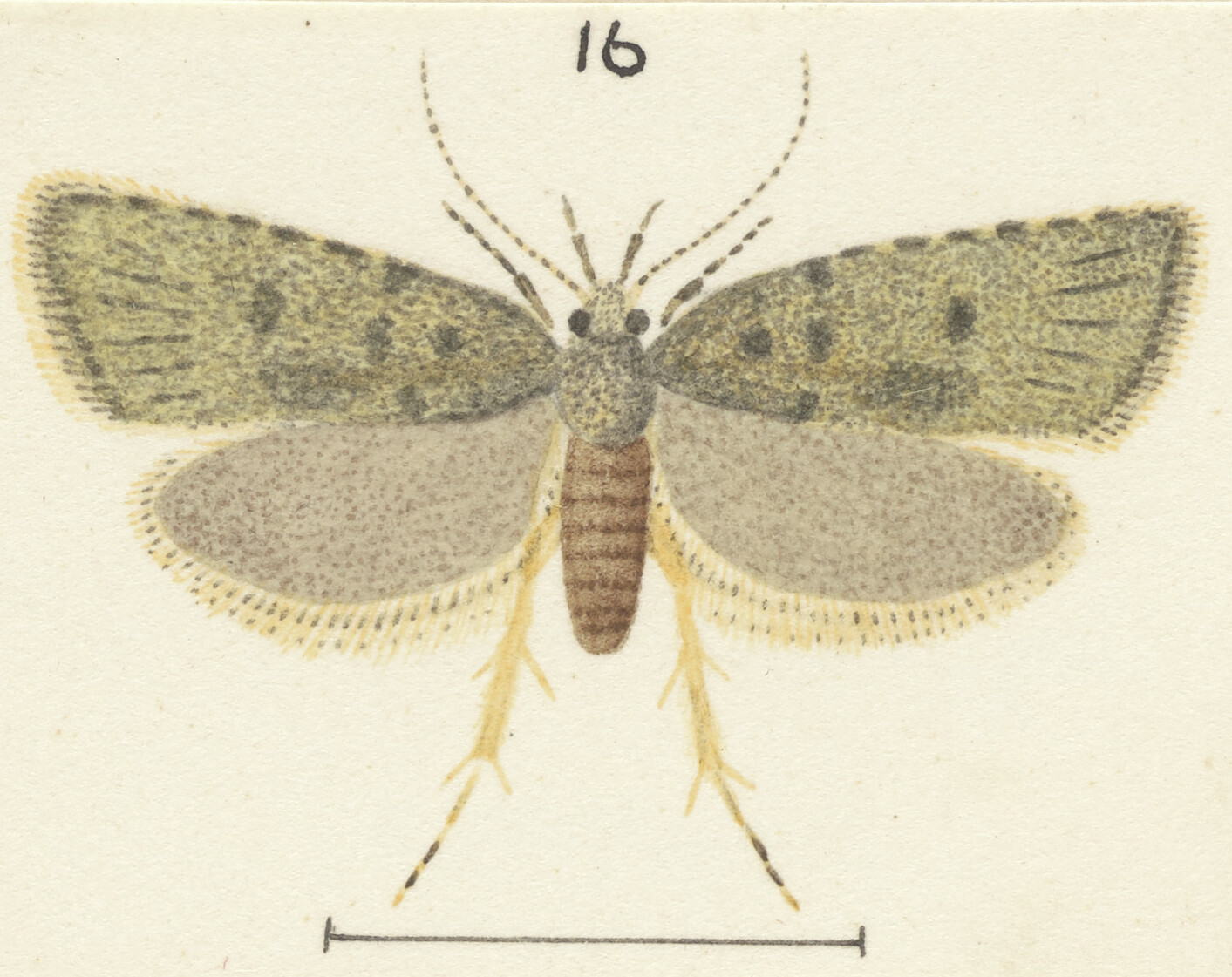

Conservation status
- Data Deficit (NZ TCS)

Scientific classification
- Kingdom: Animalia
- Phylum: Arthropoda
- Clade: Pancrustacea
- Class: Insecta
- Order: Lepidoptera
- Family: Depressariidae
- Genus: Phaeosaces
- Species: P. lindsayae

Binomial name
- Phaeosaces lindsayae (Philpott, 1928)

Synonyms
- Cryptolechia lindsayae Philpott, 1928

= Phaeosaces lindsayae =

Species of moth

Phaeosaces lindsayae is a species of moth in the family Depressariidae. It is endemic to New Zealand. In 2025 this species was classified as "data deficient" under the New Zealand Threat Classification System.

== Taxonomy ==
This species was described by Alfred Philpott in 1928 using specimens collected by Jean Lindsay at "Blackmillar" (Black Miller Stream), Kaikōura and named Crytopechia lindsayae. George Hudson discussed and illustrated the species under this name in 1939. In 1988 John S. Dugdale reinstated the genus Phaeosaces and assigned P. lindsayae to it. This species was named in honour of its first collector Mrs Jean Lindsay. The holotype specimen is held at the Canterbury Museum.

== Description ==
Philpott described the species as follows:

Male.- 21 mm. Head and thorax ochreous grey, mixed with fuscous. Palpi ochreous grey mixed with blackish, terminal segment black externally, except at apex. Antennae ochreous, annulated with black. Abdomen greyish fuscous. Legs, posterior pair ochreous, tarsi annulated with fuscous; middle pair more or less infuscated, tarsi annulated with ochreous; anterior pair dark fuscous, tarsi annulated with ochreous. Forewings moderate, costa well arched basally, apex rounded, termen oblique; ochreous grey, densely irrorated with dark fuscous, the irroration tending to form costal spots and interrupted transverse strigae; stigmata obscurely indicated, pical beneath first discal, second discal rather large, transverse; veins faintly outlined in fuscous towards termen; a blackish terminal line; fringes ochreous, sprinkled with fuscous. Hindwings greyish fuscous with fuscous subbasal line and traces of a similar subapical one.

== Distribution ==
P. lindsayae is endemic to New Zealand. It has only been collected at its type locality.

== Biology and behaviour ==
Adults of this species is on the wing in December.

== Conservation status ==
In 2025 this species was classified by the New Zealand Department of Conservation as "data deficient" under the New Zealand Threat Classification System.
