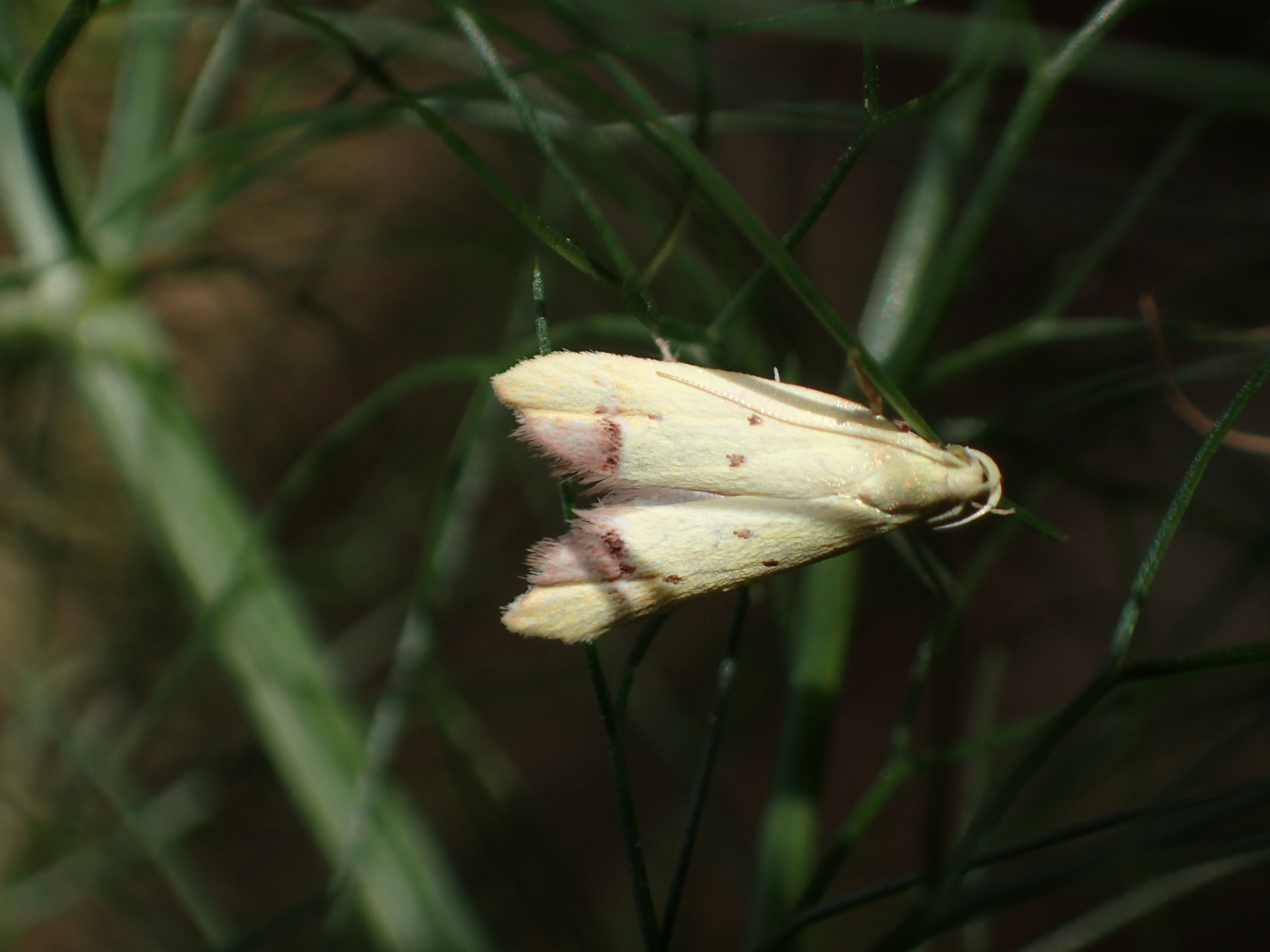
- Gymnobathra flavidella

Scientific classification
- Kingdom: Animalia
- Phylum: Arthropoda
- Clade: Pancrustacea
- Class: Insecta
- Order: Lepidoptera
- Family: Oecophoridae
- Subfamily: Oecophorinae
- Genus: Gymnobathra; Meyrick, 1883

= Gymnobathra =

Genus of moths

Gymnobathra is a genus of moths in the family Oecophoridae. It was first described by Edward Meyrick in 1883. All species are found in New Zealand.

== Species ==
In alphabetical order:

- Gymnobathra ambigua (Philpott, 1926)
- Gymnobathra bryaula Meyrick, 1905
- Gymnobathra caliginosa Philpott, 1927
- Gymnobathra calliploca Meyrick, 1883
- Gymnobathra callixyla (Meyrick, 1888)
- Gymnobathra cenchrias (Meyrick, 1909)
- Gymnobathra dinocosma (Meyrick, 1883)
- Gymnobathra flavidella (Walker, 1864)
- Gymnobathra hamatella (Walker, 1864)
- Gymnobathra hyetodes Meyrick, 1883
- Gymnobathra inaequata Philpott, 1928
- Gymnobathra levigata Philpott, 1928
- Gymnobathra omphalota Meyrick, 1888
- Gymnobathra origenes Meyrick, 1936
- Gymnobathra parca (Butler, 1877)
- Gymnobathra philadelpha Meyrick, 1883
- Gymnobathra primaria Philpott, 1928
- Gymnobathra rufopunctella Hudson, 1950
- Gymnobathra sarcoxantha Meyrick, 1883
- Gymnobathra tholodella Meyrick, 1883
