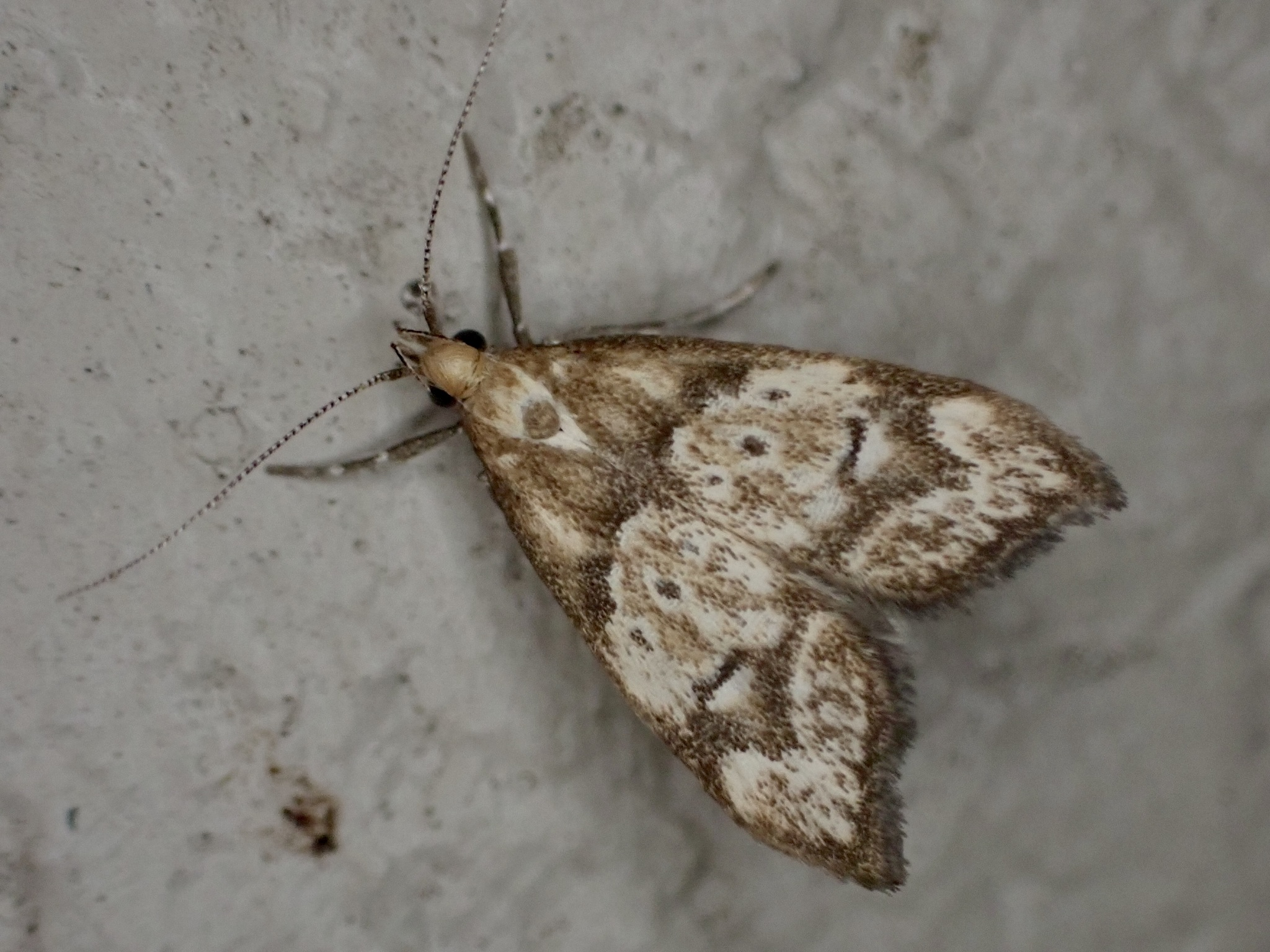

Scientific classification
- Domain: Eukaryota
- Kingdom: Animalia
- Phylum: Arthropoda
- Class: Insecta
- Order: Lepidoptera
- Family: Oecophoridae
- Genus: Gymnobathra
- Species: G. hamatella

Binomial name
- Gymnobathra hamatella (Walker, 1864)

Synonyms
- Oecophora hamatella Walker, 1864; Gymnobathra omichleuta Meyrick, 1929

= Gymnobathra hamatella =

Species of moth

Gymnobathra hamatella is a moth of the family Oecophoridae. It was described by Francis Walker in 1864. It is found in New Zealand.
