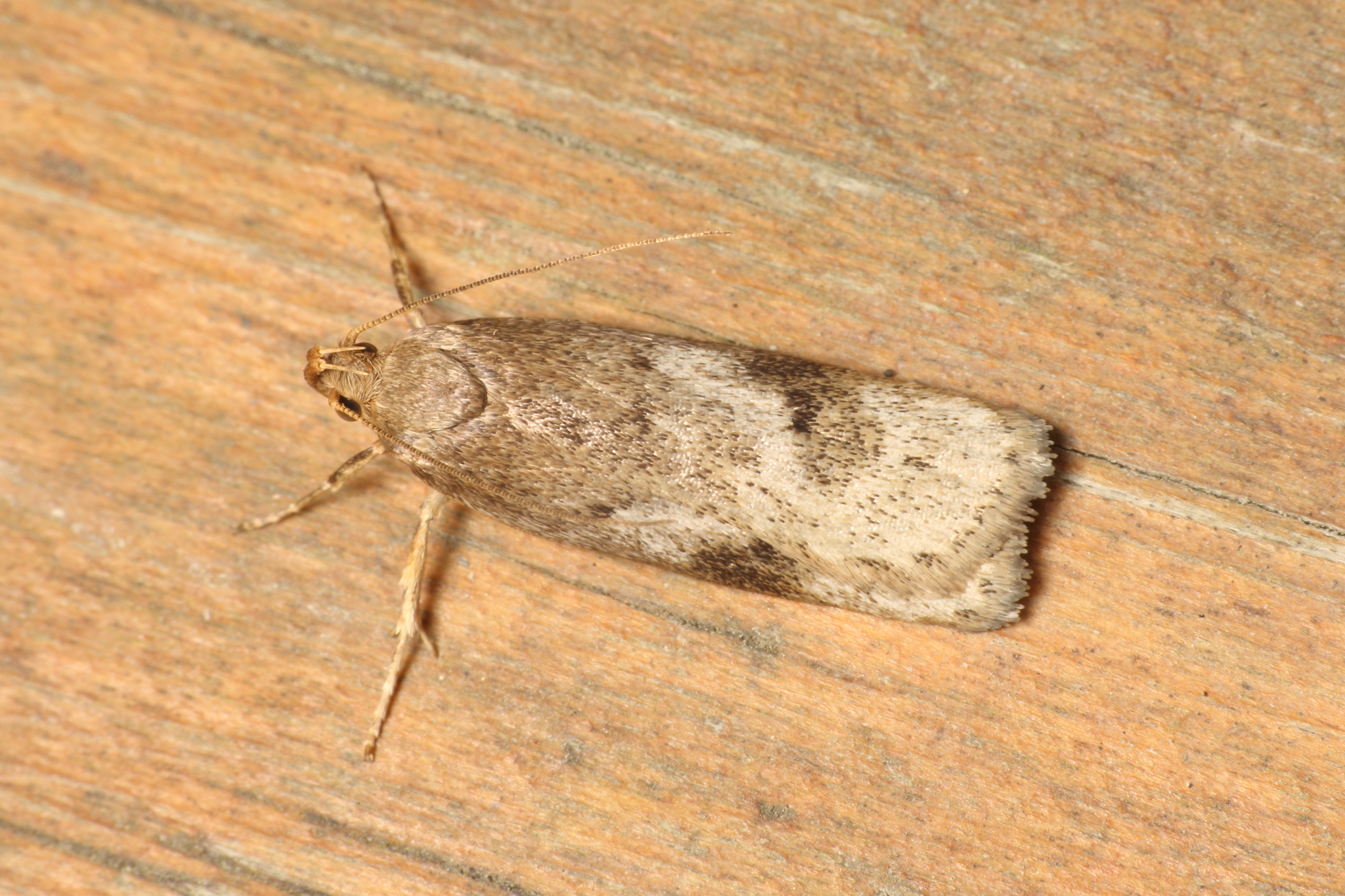

Scientific classification
- Kingdom: Animalia
- Phylum: Arthropoda
- Clade: Pancrustacea
- Class: Insecta
- Order: Lepidoptera
- Family: Depressariidae
- Genus: Phaeosaces
- Species: P. apocrypta

Binomial name
- Phaeosaces apocrypta Meyrick, 1885

= Phaeosaces apocrypta =

Species of moth

Phaeosaces apocrypta is a species of moth in the family Depressariidae. It was first described by Edward Meyrick in 1885. This species is endemic to New Zealand.

Adults are attracted to light and have been collected via a mercury vapour light trap.
