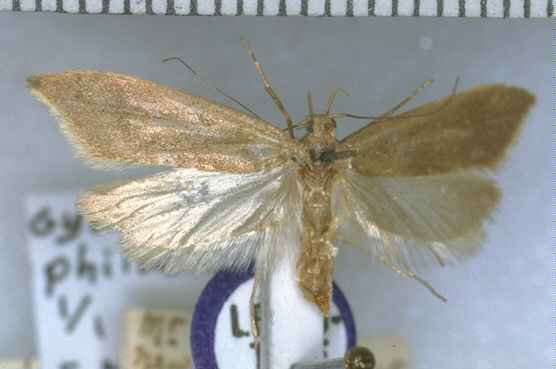
- Female lectotype specimen

Scientific classification
- Kingdom: Animalia
- Phylum: Arthropoda
- Class: Insecta
- Order: Lepidoptera
- Family: Oecophoridae
- Genus: Gymnobathra
- Species: G. philadelpha

Binomial name
- Gymnobathra philadelpha Meyrick, 1883

Synonyms
- Gymnobathra habropis Meyrick, 1888

= Gymnobathra philadelpha =

Species of moth endemic to New Zealand

Gymnobathra philadelpha is a moth in the family Oecophoridae first described by Edward Meyrick in 1883. It is endemic to New Zealand.
