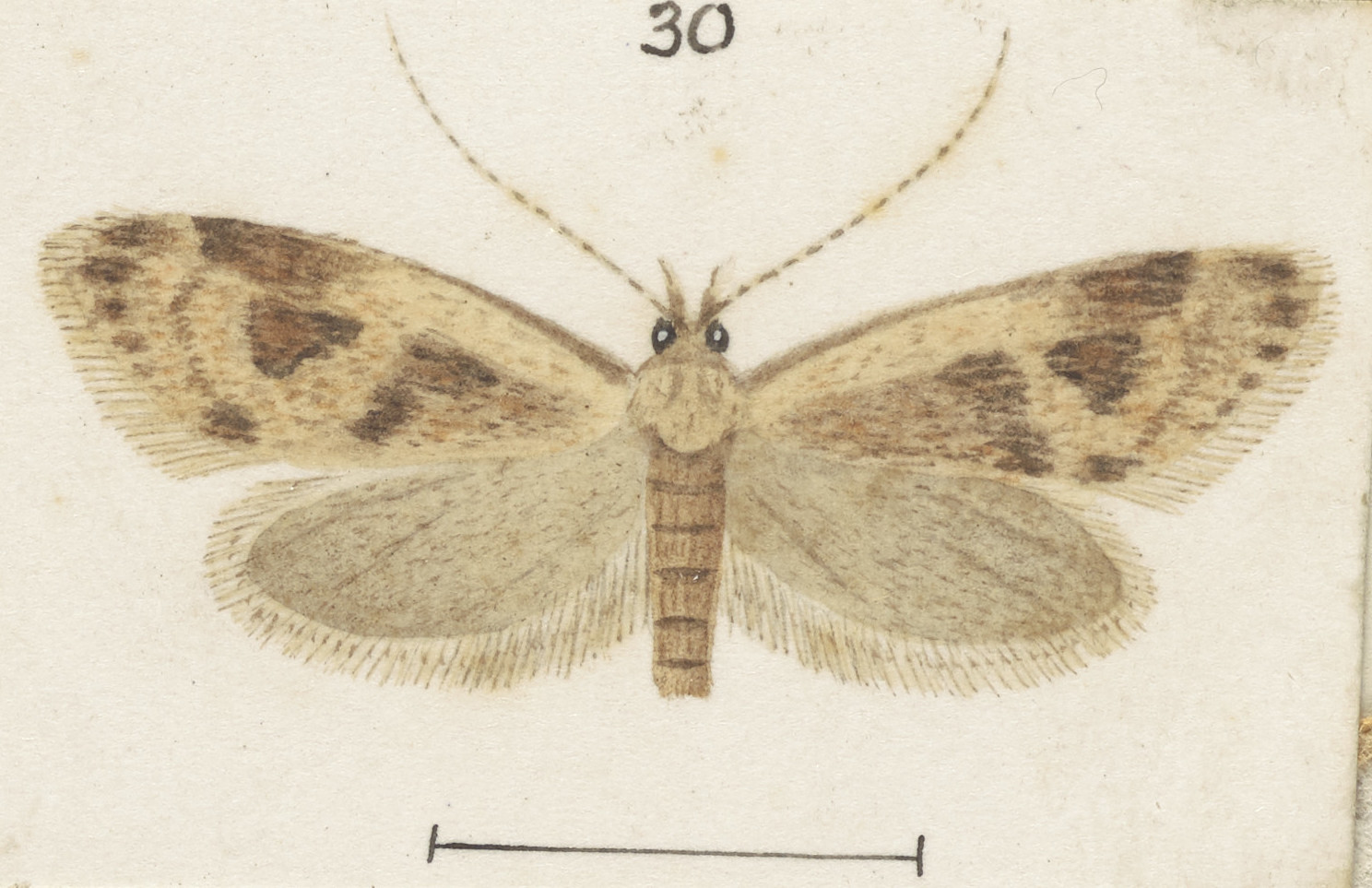

Scientific classification
- Kingdom: Animalia
- Phylum: Arthropoda
- Class: Insecta
- Order: Lepidoptera
- Family: Oecophoridae
- Genus: Gymnobathra
- Species: G. cenchrias

Binomial name
- Gymnobathra cenchrias (Meyrick, 1909)

Synonyms
- Borkhausenia cenchrias Meyrick, 1909

= Gymnobathra cenchrias =

Species of moth

Gymnobathra cenchrias is a moth of the family Oecophoridae. It was described by Edward Meyrick in 1909. It is found in New Zealand.
