= Gymnobathra calliploca =

Scientific classification
- Kingdom: Animalia
- Phylum: Arthropoda
- Clade: Pancrustacea
- Class: Insecta
- Order: Lepidoptera
- Family: Oecophoridae
- Genus: Gymnobathra
- Species: G. calliploca

Binomial name
- Gymnobathra calliploca Meyrick, 1883

Species of moth endemic to New Zealand

Gymnobathra calliploca is a moth of the family Oecophoridae. It was first described by Edward Meyrick in 1883. It is endemic to New Zealand and has been observed in the southern half of the North Island and on the western side as well as in the southern portion of the South Island. This species frequents dense forest and can be found up to altitudes of 2,500 feet (760 m). The larvae feed on leaf-litter. Adults are on the wing from October until March and are attracted to light. As adults this species can be distinguished by its conspicuous dark costal dots. Some specimens are slightly darker than others.

== Taxonomy ==
This species was first described by Edward Meyrick in 1883 using a male specimen collected in Dunedin by A. Purdie. Meyrick gave a fuller description of the species in 1884. In 1927 Alfred Philpott discussed and illustrated the male genitalia Gymnobathra inaequata thinking it was this species. Philpott recognised his error and corrected the illustration of the genitalia of G. calliploca in the latter publication where he first described G. inaequata. George Hudson discussed and illustrated this species in his 1928 book The butterflies and moths of New Zealand. The male holotype is held at the Natural History Museum, London.

== Description ==
Illustration of male.

Side view of G. calliploca.

Darker specimen.

Meyrick described the male of this species as follows:

Male — 17 mm. Head, palpi, antennae, thorax, abdomen, and legs pale whitish-ochreous ; second joint of palpi externally, and anterior margin of thorax suffused with dark fuscous; anterior and middle tibie dark fuscous with pale central and apical rings, tarsi banded with dark fuscous. Fore-wings moderate, costa moderately arched, apex obtuse, hindmargin straight, oblique ; pale whitish-ochreous, finely and scantily irrorated with fuscous and dark fuscous scales; a small dark fuscous spot at base of costa; five conspicuous dark fuscous dots on posterior half of costa; a dark fuscous dot in disc before middle, a second beyond middle, and a third on fold rather beyond first ; a cloudy dark fuscous streak along hindmargin from apex nearly to anal angle, thickest above, attenuated beneath; a row of cloudy dark fuscous dots along hindmargin, partially obscured in the streak : cilia pale whitish-ochreous, basal half with fine dark fuscous bars on the veins. Hindwings pale grey, cilia grey-whitish.

Meyrick stated that this species can be distinguished by its conspicuous dark costal dots. Hudson pointed out that some specimens of this species are slightly darker than others.

== Distribution ==
This species is endemic to New Zealand. This species has been observed in the southern half of the North Island and on the western side as well as in the southern portion of the South Island.

== Habitat and hosts ==
G. callipolca frequents dense forest and can be found up to altitudes of 2,500 feet (760 m). The larvae feed on leaf-litter.

== Behaviour ==
Larvae create nests of silk which are then covered with parts of leaves as well as frass. They then feed by forming galleries from their silk nest into the leaf-litter to which they then travel.

Adults are on the wing from October until March. Adults are attracted to light.
