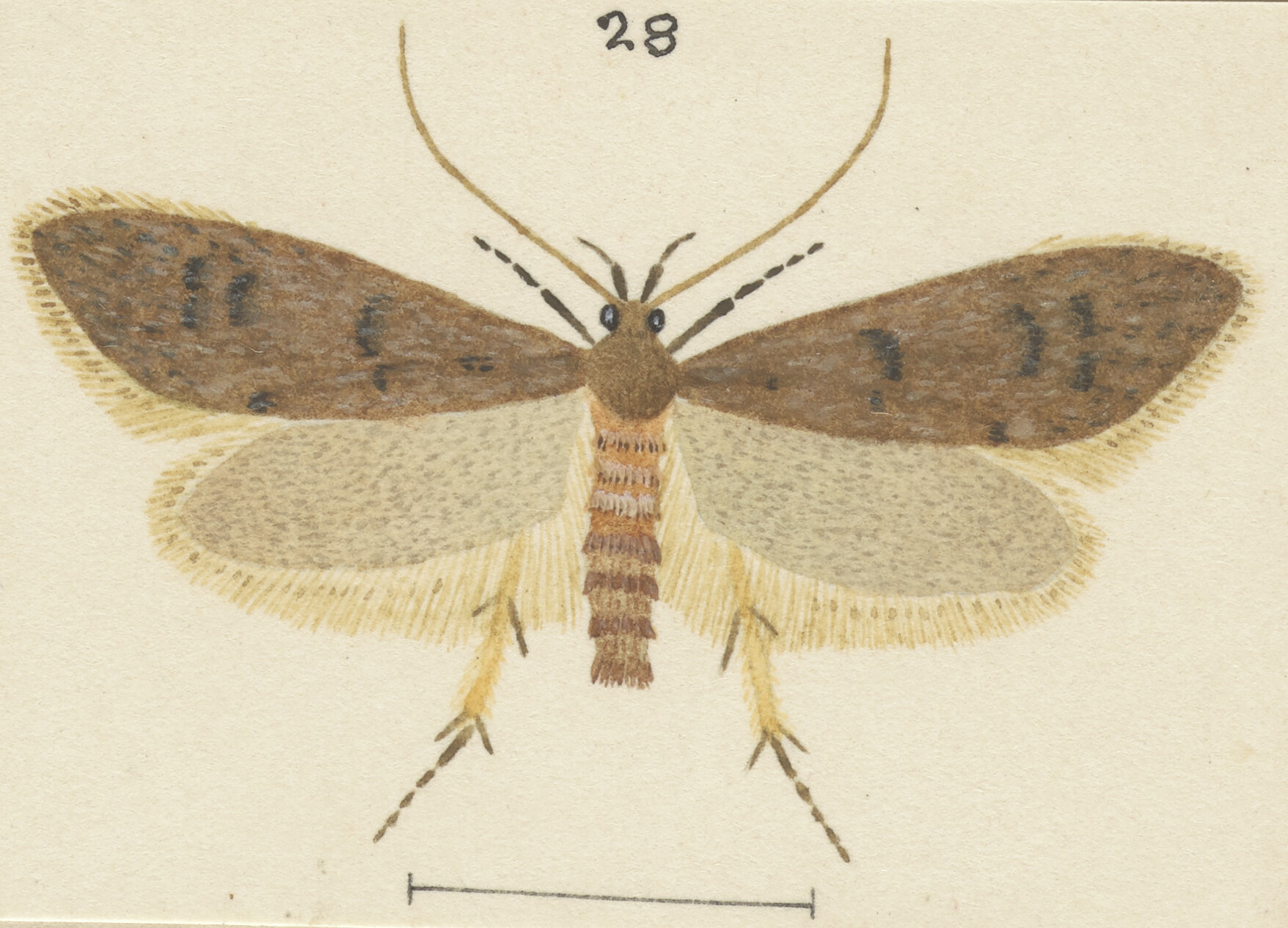

Scientific classification
- Domain: Eukaryota
- Kingdom: Animalia
- Phylum: Arthropoda
- Class: Insecta
- Order: Lepidoptera
- Family: Oecophoridae
- Genus: Gymnobathra
- Species: G. caliginosa

Binomial name
- Gymnobathra caliginosa Philpott, 1927

= Gymnobathra caliginosa =

Species of moth

Gymnobathra caliginosa is a moth of the family Oecophoridae. It was described by Alfred Philpott in 1927. It is endemic to New Zealand.
