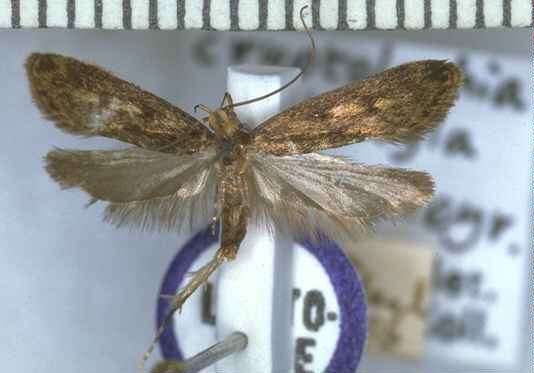
- Male lectotype

Scientific classification
- Kingdom: Animalia
- Phylum: Arthropoda
- Class: Insecta
- Order: Lepidoptera
- Family: Oecophoridae
- Genus: Gymnobathra
- Species: G. callixyla

Binomial name
- Gymnobathra callixyla (Meyrick, 1888)

Synonyms
- Leptosaces callixyla Meyrick, 1888; Cryptolechia callixyla (Meyrick, 1888)

= Gymnobathra callixyla =

Species of moth endemic to New Zealand

Gymnobathra callixyla is a moth in the family Oecophoridae first described by Edward Meyrick in 1888. It is endemic to New Zealand.

== Taxonomy ==
This species was first described by Edward Meyrick in 1888 and named Leptosaces callixyla. in 1915 Meyrick placed this species within the genus Cryptolechia. In 1988 J. S. Dugdale placed this species in the genus Gymnobathra. However it has been hypothesised that this species probably belongs in a different genus.

== Description ==
The wingspan is 16–18 mm. The forewings are rather dark fuscous, strewn with yellow-ochreous scales, in female suffused with yellow-ochreous towards the inner margin. There is a longitudinal yellow-ochreous streak in disc from one-third to three-fourths, in females extended to the base. There is a cloudy dark fuscous dot on this streak at one-third, a second beyond the middle and a third on the fold obliquely beyond the first. There is a yellow-ochreous transverse line, in males ill-defined, from four-fifths of the costa to the anal angle, sharply angulated in the middle, indented beneath the costa. There is an irregular yellow-ochreous hindmarginal line. The hindwings are grey.
