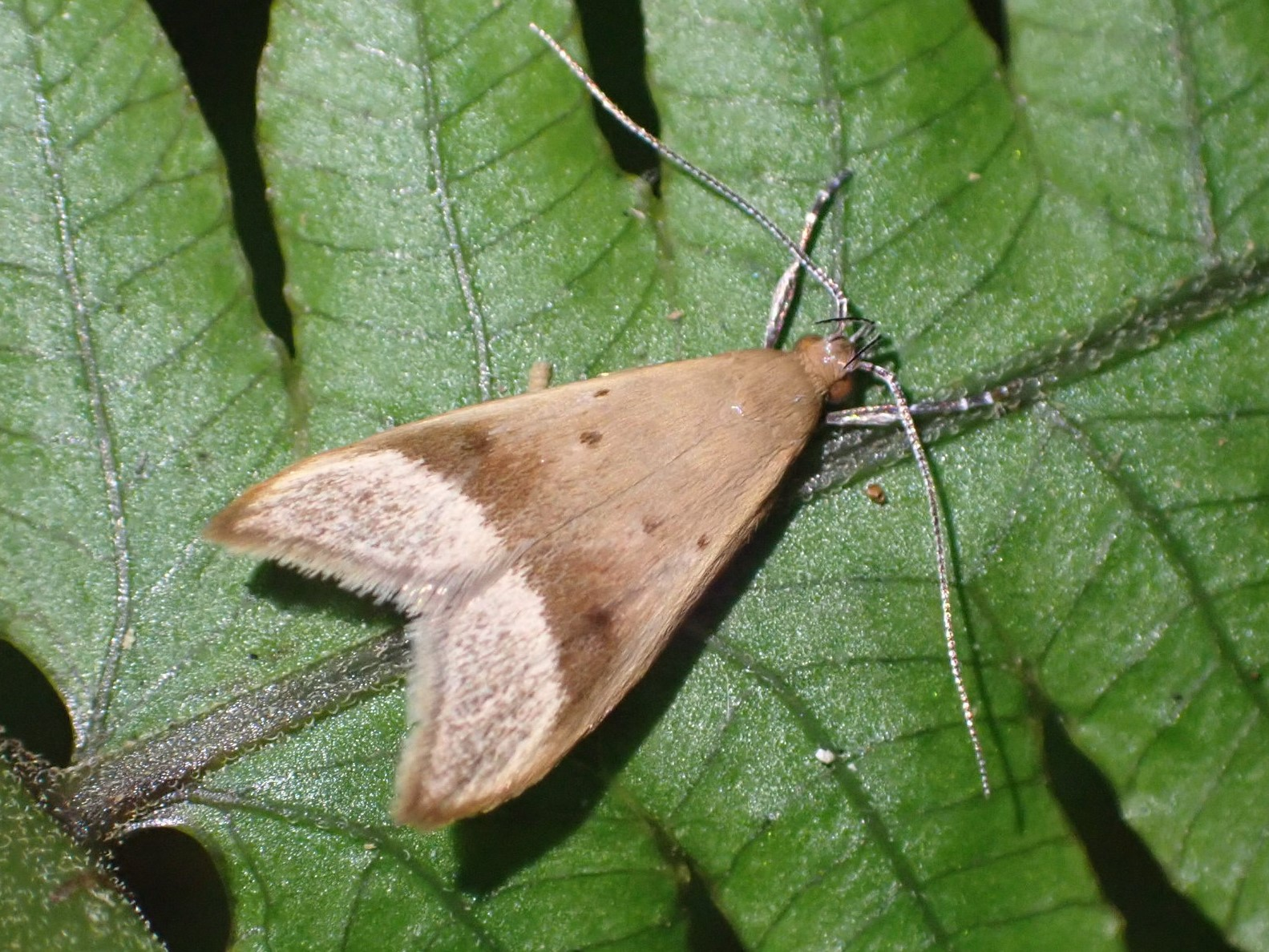
- Male
- Female

Scientific classification
- Kingdom: Animalia
- Phylum: Arthropoda
- Clade: Pancrustacea
- Class: Insecta
- Order: Lepidoptera
- Family: Oecophoridae
- Genus: Gymnobathra
- Species: G. hyetodes

Binomial name
- Gymnobathra hyetodes Meyrick, 1883

= Gymnobathra hyetodes =

Species of moth endemic to New Zealand

Gymnobathra hyetodes, also known as the small angle-wing, is a moth of the family Oecophoridae. It was first described by Edward Meyrick in 1883. It is endemic to New Zealand and is found in the North Island. This species frequents dense native forest. G. hyetodes likely has only one brood per year. Larvae feed on dead wood and have been reared on dead twigs dead material of Melicope ternata. Adults can be easily distinguished from similar species as its forewings are "sickle-shaped". The male has a dark brown ground colour where as the female has a yellowish or very pale brown ground colour. Adults are on the wing from December until March, are nocturnal, and are attracted to light. They have been observed at rest both on the ground and on ferns and brambles.

== Taxonomy ==
This species was first described by Edward Meyrick in 1883 using specimens taken by Richard William Fereday in Wellington. Meyrick gave a fuller description of this species in 1884. In 1915 Meyrick confirmed the placement of this species in Gymnobathra. In 1927 Alfred Philpott described and illustrated the male genitalia of this species. George Hudson discussed and illustrated this species in his 1928 book The butterflies and moths of New Zealand. In 1988 John S. Dugdale again confirmed the placement of this species in the genus Gymnobathra. The male lectotype is held at the Natural History Museum, London.

== Description ==
Live moth.

Illustration of male.

Illustration of female.

Meyrick described this adult male and female of this species as follows:

Male.—20 mm. Head and thorax greyish-fuscous. Palpi whitish, anterior edge marked by a sharp black line throughout, second joint also with a black stripe on each side. Antennae dark fuscous. Abdomen fuscous-grey. Legs dark fuscous, apex of tarsal joints whitish, posterior tibie grey. Forewings moderate, considerably dilated posteriorly, costa moderately arched, apex acute, hindmargin sinuate, rather strongly oblique ; light fuscous, paler posteriorly, irrorated with darker; an indistinct darker dot in disc before middle, and a second rather obliquely beyond it on fold ; a cloudy dark fuscous transverse fascia from 2/3 of costa to 3/4 of inner margin, obsolete on margins, posterior edge tolerably well-defined, slightly concave, anterior edge suffused, containing an obscure darker dot in disc: cilia with basal half dark fuscous, apical half whitish-ochreous. Hindwings dark fuscous ; cilia dark fuscous, tips paler.
Female.—26 mm. Similar to male, but head, thorax, abdomen, posterior tibie, forewings, and hindwings with fuscous colour wholly changed to golden-ochreous.

This species is easily distinguished as its forewings are "sickle-shaped". Although the male and female appear dissimilar, the difference is only in the ground colour of specimens. The male has a dark brown ground colour where as the female has a yellowish or very pale brown ground colour. This sexual disparity is unusual in this genus. Meyrick and Hudson both hypothesised that the colouration of this moth, and particularly the female, is intended to be protective as it is similar to the colour of a decaying leaf. Hudson thought the female may particularly need this protection when laying her eggs.

== Distribution ==
G. hyetodes is endemic to New Zealand. It is found throughout the North Island and is regarded as being widespread.

== Habitat and hosts ==
This species frequents dense native forest. The larvae of this species feeds on dead wood. Larvae have been reared from dead material of Melicope ternata.

== Behaviour ==
This species likely has only one brood a year. Adults are on the wing from December until March. They are nocturnal and are attracted to light. Adults of both sexes very frequently rest on the ground, with closed wings, and this habit increases the value of their protective colouring. They have also been observed at rest on ferns and brambles.
