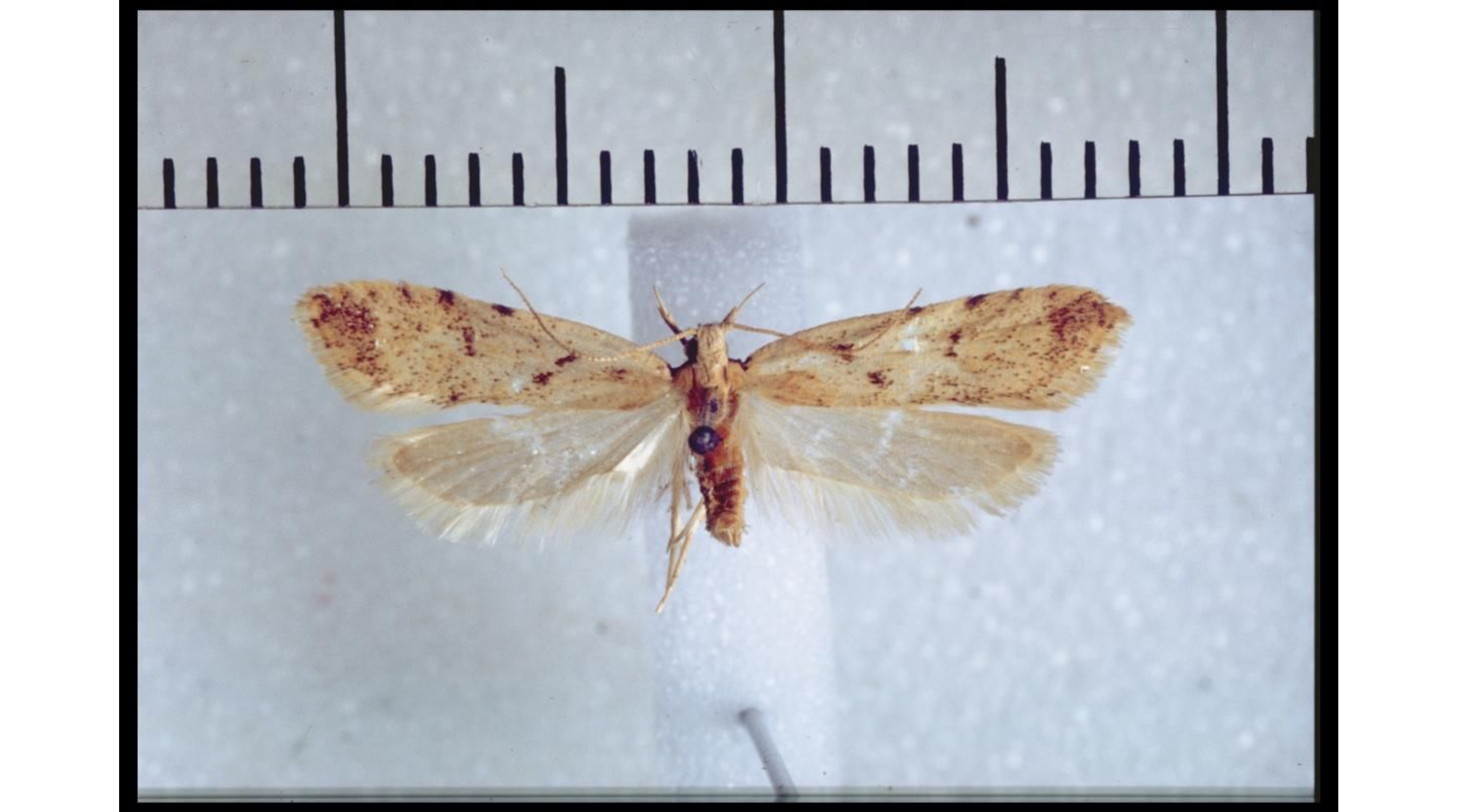
- Male holotype

Scientific classification
- Kingdom: Animalia
- Phylum: Arthropoda
- Clade: Pancrustacea
- Class: Insecta
- Order: Lepidoptera
- Family: Oecophoridae
- Genus: Gymnobathra
- Species: G. inaequata

Binomial name
- Gymnobathra inaequata Philpott, 1928

= Gymnobathra inaequata =

Species of moth endemic to New Zealand

Gymnobathra inaequata is a moth of the family Oecophoridae. It was first described by Alfred Philpott in 1928. It is endemic to New Zealand and has been observed in the wider Nelson region in the South Island and at Te Papa-Kura-o-Taranaki in the North Island. G. inaequata is likely restricted to altitudes below 3,000 feet (910 m). Adults are on the wing in November and December.

== Taxonomy ==
This species was first described by Alfred Philpott in 1928 using specimens collected at Dun Mountain, Flora River and Cobb Valley in the Nelson region. In 1927 Philpott illustrated the genitalia of the male of what he thought was G. calliploca but was actually this species. He corrected this error the 1928 description of G. inaequata. The male holotype, collected at Dun Mountain by Philpott, is held at the New Zealand Arthropod Collection.

== Description ==
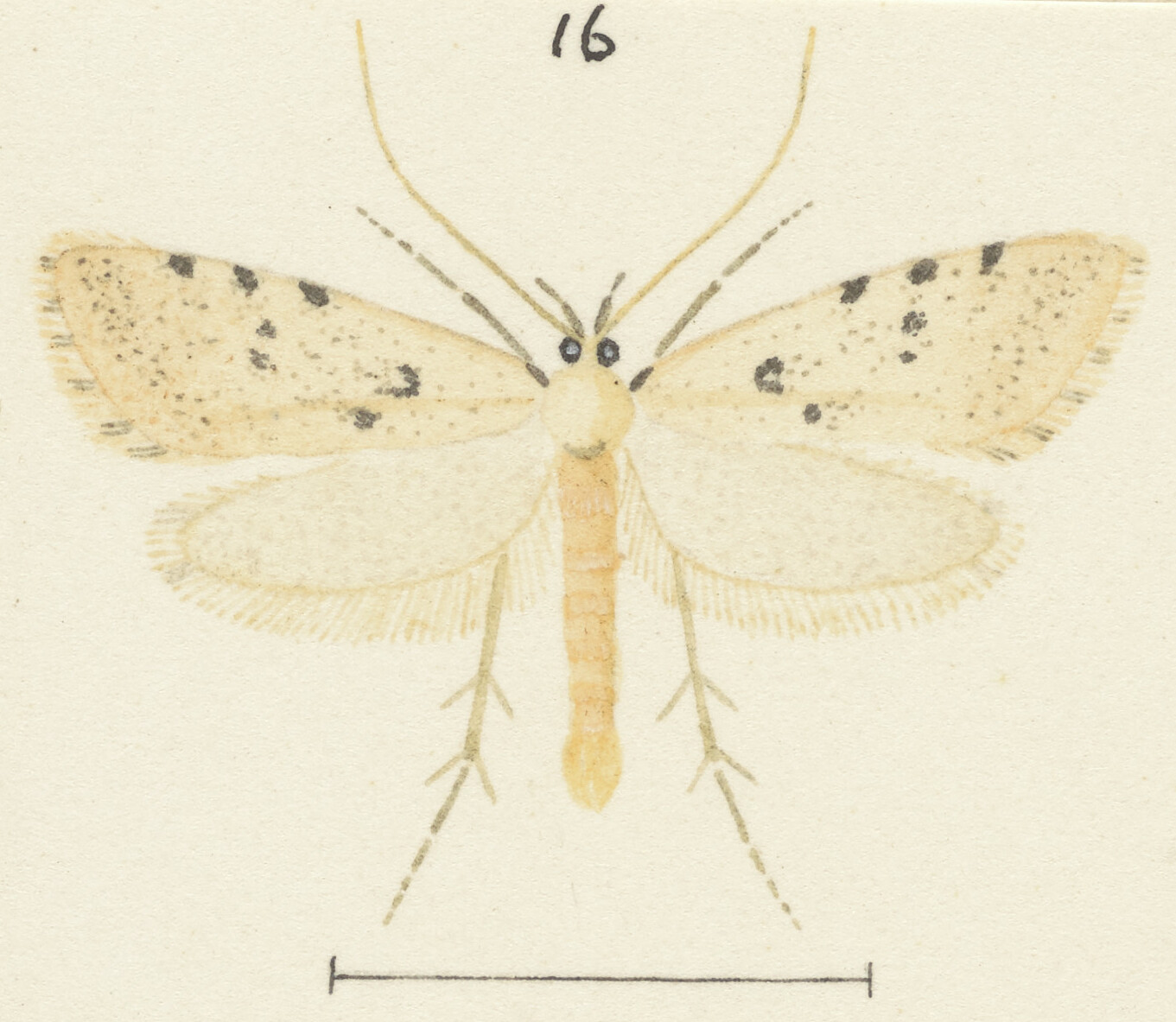
Illustration of male.

Philpott described this species as follows:

♂♀. 17–19. Head and thorax pale ochreous, base of tegulae fuscous. Palpi, second segment thickened with appressed scales, apex broad and truncate, ochreous; second segment outwardly fuscous. Antennae ochreous, ciliations in ♂ about 1. Abdomen brassy, segmental divisions whitish, anal tuft ochreous. Legs ochreous, densely irrorated with fuscous, especially anterior pairs. Forewings, costa moderately arched, apex blunt-pointed, termen rounded, oblique; whitish-ochreous (in ♀ browner) sprinkled with blackish-fuscous; markings blackish-fuscous; a small area at costa at base; first discal rather irregular, obliquely before plical which is roundish and as large as, or larger than, first discal; second discal smaller, dot-like or transversely linear; four or five dots on costa between ½ and apex, apical ones usually very obscure: fringes whitish-ochreous with some fuscous scales. Hindwings shining whitish: fringes ochreous tinged.

Philpott pointed out that this species is extremely similar to G. levigata but easily separated by the difference in the palpi. This species can also be distinguished on the male and female genitalia.

== Distribution ==
This species is endemic to New Zealand. It has been observed in the wider Nelson region, including at Lake Rotoroa, as well as at Te Papa-Kura-o-Taranaki in the North Island. G. inaequata is likely restricted to altitudes below 3,000 feet (910 m).

== Behaviour ==
The adults of this species are on the wing most commonly in November and December.
