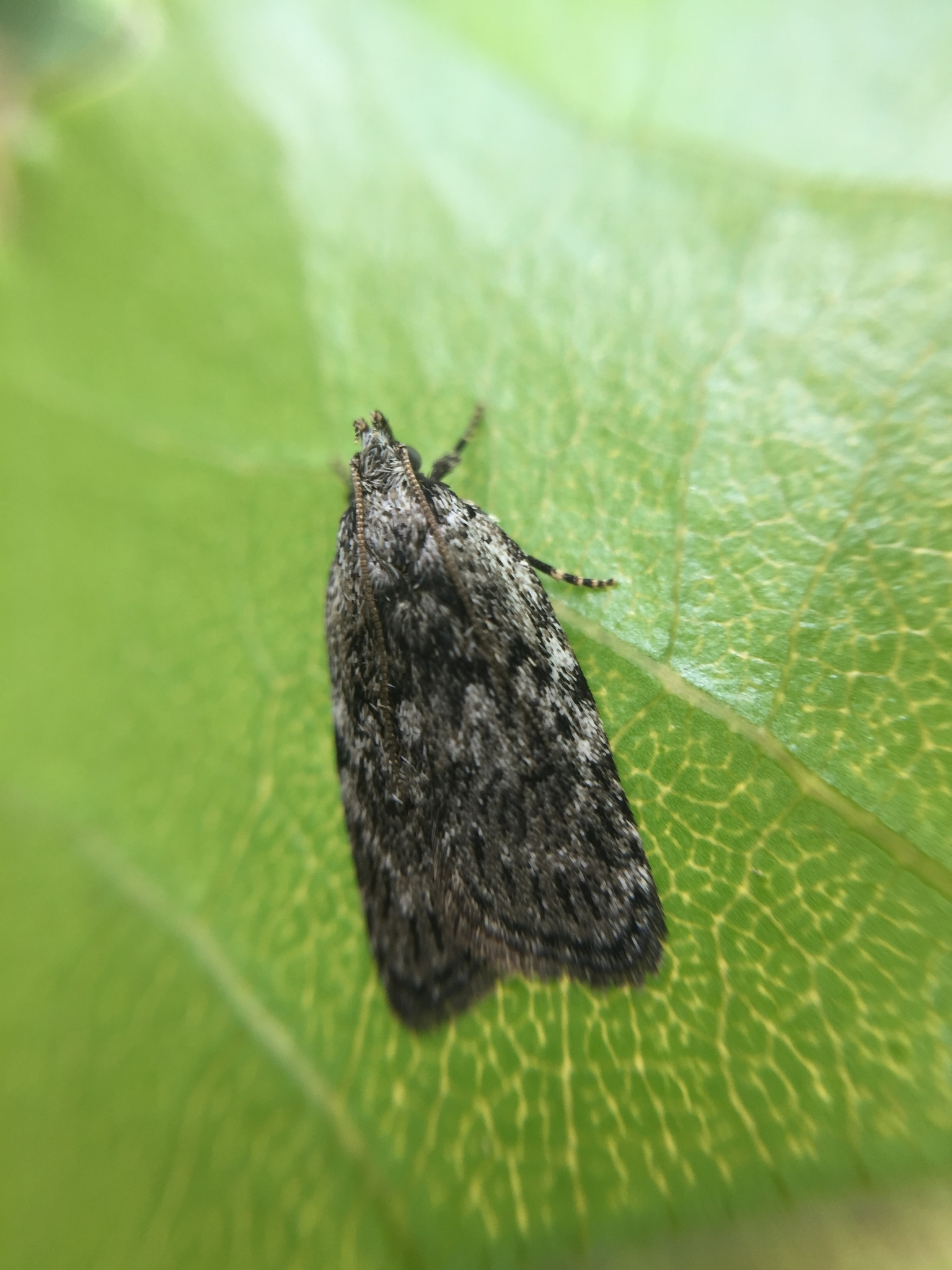

Scientific classification
- Kingdom: Animalia
- Phylum: Arthropoda
- Class: Insecta
- Order: Lepidoptera
- Family: Depressariidae
- Genus: Phaeosaces
- Species: P. compsotypa

Binomial name
- Phaeosaces compsotypa Meyrick, 1885

= Phaeosaces compsotypa =

Species of moth

Phaeosaces compsotypa is a species of moth. It is endemic to New Zealand. The species has been known as Cryptolechia compsotypa until Phaeosaces was reinstated as a valid genus by John S. Dugdale in 1988.
