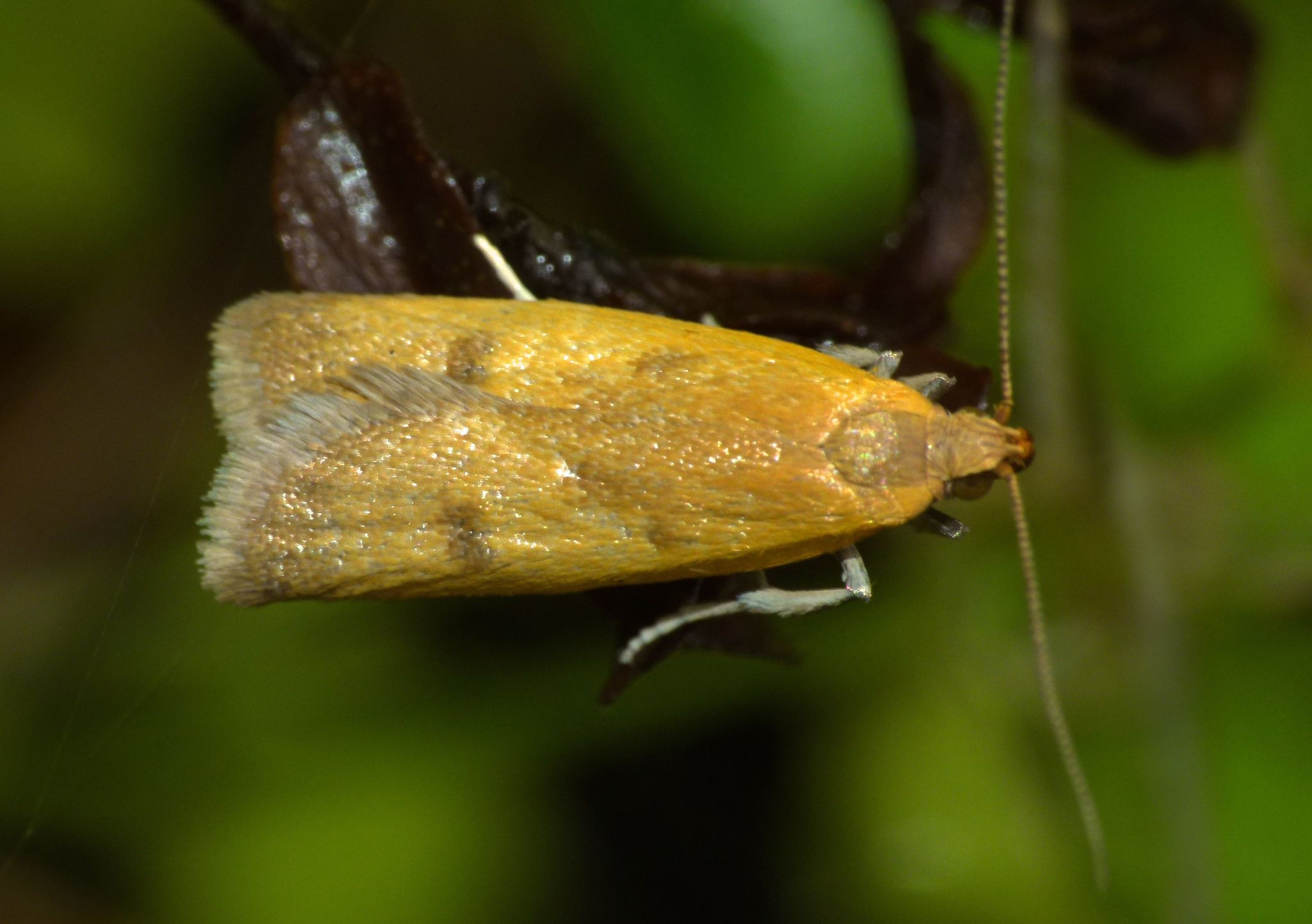

Scientific classification
- Kingdom: Animalia
- Phylum: Arthropoda
- Class: Insecta
- Order: Lepidoptera
- Family: Oecophoridae
- Genus: Gymnobathra
- Species: G. parca

Binomial name
- Gymnobathra parca (Butler, 1877)

Synonyms
- Oecophora parca Butler, 1877

= Gymnobathra parca =

Species of moth endemic to New Zealand

Gymnobathra parca is a moth in the family Oecophoridae first described by Arthur Gardiner Butler in 1877. It is endemic to New Zealand. It has been hypothesised that this species likely belongs to another genus.
