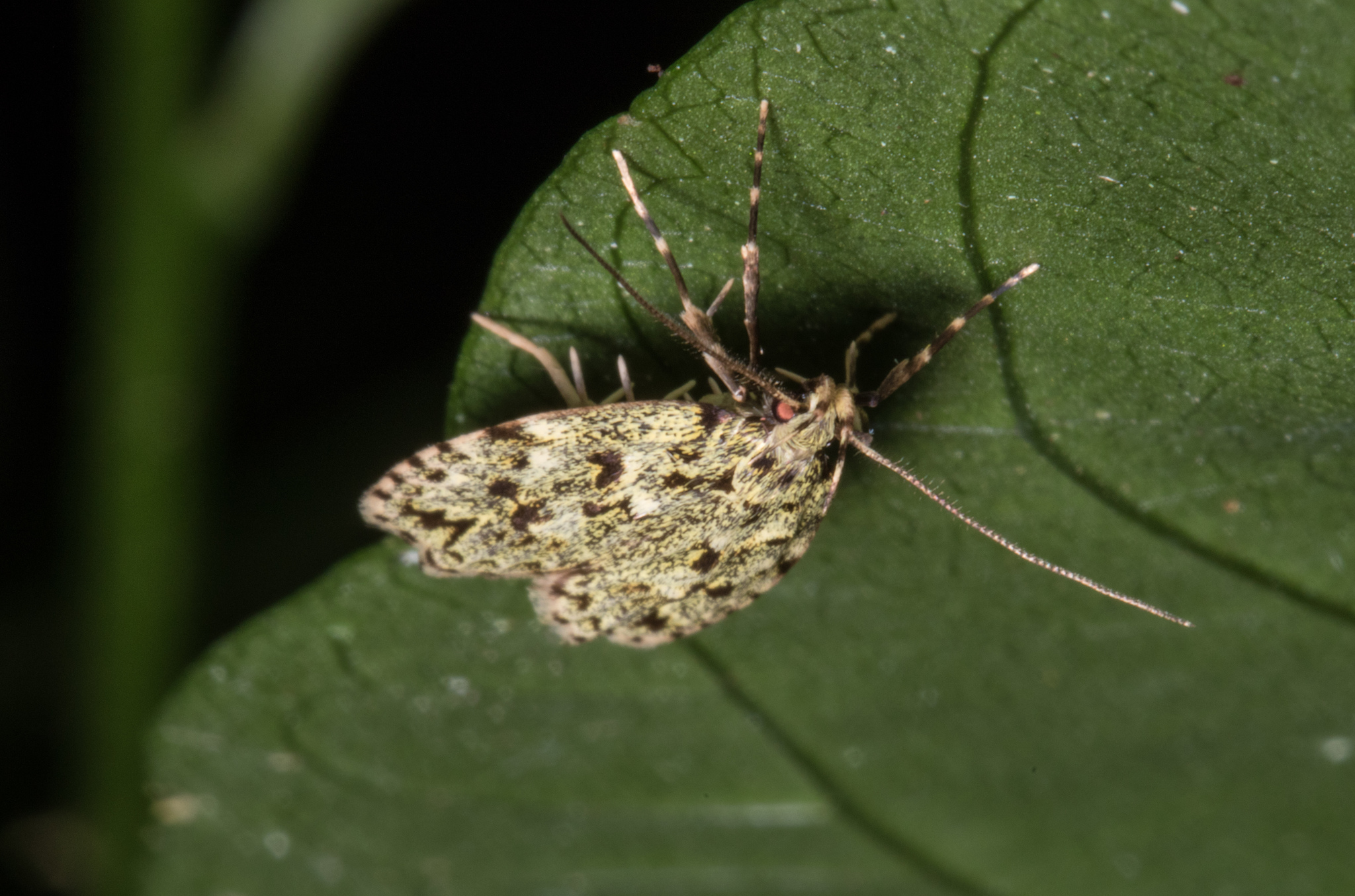

Scientific classification
- Kingdom: Animalia
- Phylum: Arthropoda
- Class: Insecta
- Order: Lepidoptera
- Family: Oecophoridae
- Genus: Gymnobathra
- Species: G. bryaula

Binomial name
- Gymnobathra bryaula Meyrick, 1905

= Gymnobathra bryaula =

Species of moth

Gymnobathra bryaula is a moth of the family Oecophoridae. It was first described by Edward Meyrick in 1905. It is endemic to New Zealand.

== Description ==
This species was described by George Hudson in 1928 as follows:

The expansion of the wings of the male is slightly under 7/8 inch, of the female slightly over 7/8 inch. The fore-wings of the male are yellowish-green speckled with black, and with black markings; there are two small black spots at the base; a small double spot near the base in the middle; three oblique discal spots before the middle; a dumbell-shaped mark in the disc beyond the middle; two small spots above the tornus; a deeply-indented broken transverse line from the costa before the apex to the tornus; a series of double dots on the costa and a series of single spots on the termen. The hind-wings are greyish-ochreous, with a series of black dots on the cilia. In the female the forewings are rather dull orange-brown, with similar black markings to the male, but both fore- and hind-wings are somewhat narrower.

== Behaviour ==
This species is on the wing in January.
