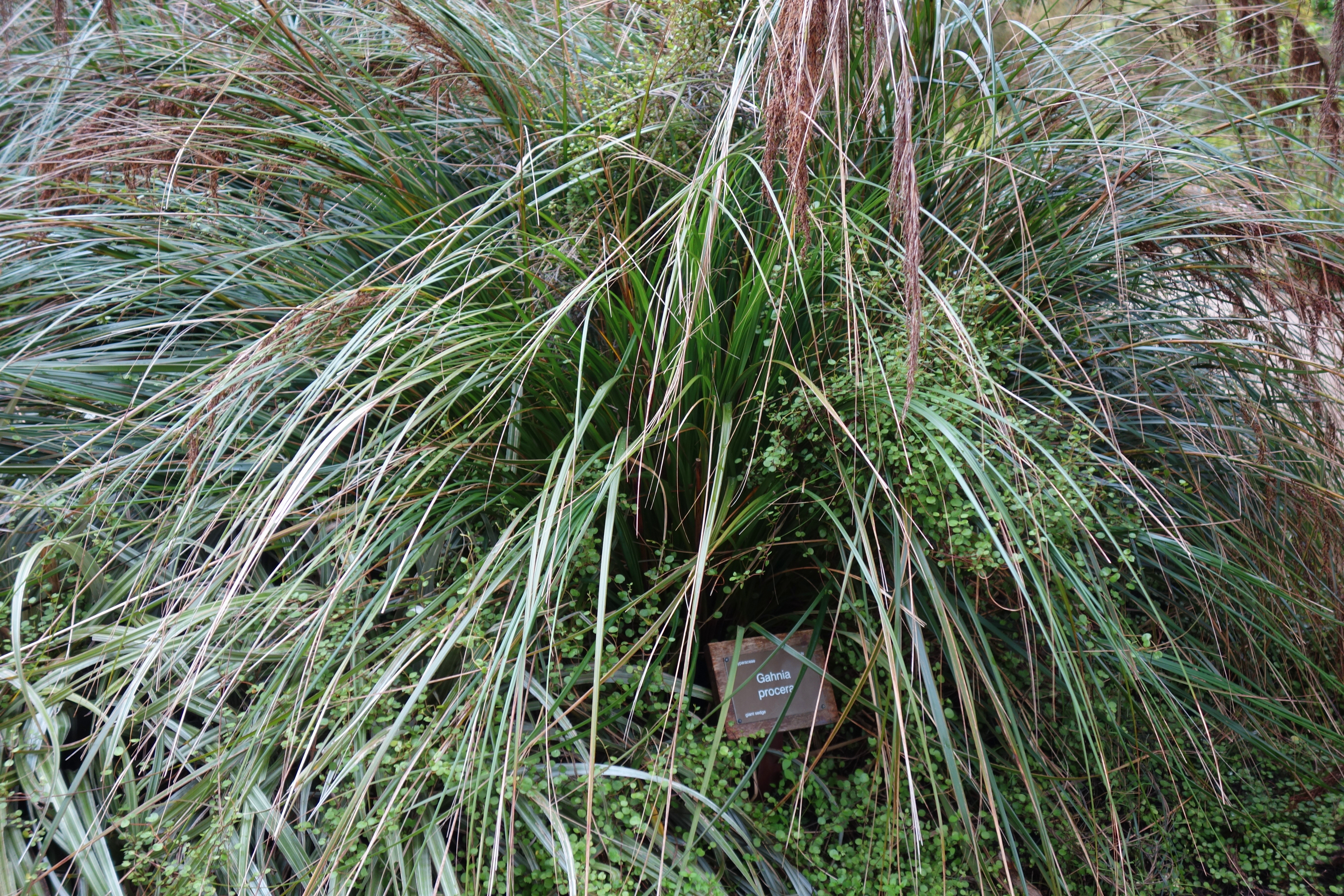
- Gahnia procera - Dunedin Botanic Garden

Scientific classification
- Kingdom: Plantae
- Clade: Tracheophytes
- Clade: Angiosperms
- Clade: Monocots
- Clade: Commelinids
- Order: Poales
- Family: Cyperaceae
- Genus: Gahnia
- Species: G. procera

Binomial name
- Gahnia procera J.R.Forst. & G.Forst., 1776

= Gahnia procera =

Species of plant

Gahnia procera is a tussock-forming perennial in the family Cyperaceae, that is native to parts of New Zealand.
