= Gymnobathra dinocosma =

Scientific classification
- Kingdom: Animalia
- Phylum: Arthropoda
- Clade: Pancrustacea
- Class: Insecta
- Order: Lepidoptera
- Family: Oecophoridae
- Genus: Gymnobathra
- Species: G. dinocosma

Binomial name
- Gymnobathra dinocosma (Meyrick, 1883)

Synonyms
- Phloeopola dinacosma Meyrick, 1883 (misspelling); Phloeopola dinocosma Meyrick, 1883; Barea dinocosma (Meyrick, 1883); Gymnobathra thetodes Meyrick, 1901

Species of moth endemic to New Zealand

Gymnobathra dinocosma is a moth of the family Oecophoridae. It was first described by Edward Meyrick in 1883. It is endemic to New Zealand and has been observed in the North and South Islands. This species frequents dense native forest and kanuka dominated scrub. The larvae feed on wood. Adults are on the wing from September until March but are more frequently observed in November and December. They are nocturnal and attracted to light. Adults have also been collected by dislodging the moths from the New Zealand endemic plant Astelia solandri.

== Taxonomy ==
This species was first described by Edward Meyrick in 1883 and named Phloeopola dinocosma. Meyrick gave a fuller description of this species in 1884. In 1901 Meyrick, thinking he was describing a new species, named this moth Gymnobathra thetodes. In 1915 Meyrick placed this species in the genus Barea. In 1927 Alfred Philpott discussed and illustrated the male genitalia of this species. George Hudson discussed and illustrated this species under the name Barea dinocosma and Gymnobathra thetodes in his 1928 book The butterflies and moths of New Zealand. In 1988 John S. Dugdale placed this species in the genus Gymnobathra and synonymised the name G. thetodes as the genitalia and wing colour pattern agreed with Wellington specimens of G. dinocosma. The synonymisation of G. thetodes by Dugdale into this species has been disputed by other experts. Meyrick stated the holotype specimen, collected in Wellington, was destroyed.

== Description ==
Illustration by Hudson showing the hindwing crescent-shaped mark.

Live moth.

Meyrick described the adult male of this species as follows:

Male.—19 mm. Head pale ochreous, with a few dark fuscous scales between antennae, and a dark fuscous spot on each side of crown. Palpi with second joint whitish-ochreous, base and a subapical ring dark fuscous, terminal joint dark fuscous, apex, base, and anterior edge whitish-ochreous. Antennae pale ochreous, indistinctly ringed with dark fuscous. Thorax pale ochreous, anteriorly suffused with dark fuscous. Abdomen whitish-ochreous. Anterior and middle legs dark fuscous, tibie with central and apical whitish-ochreous rings, tarsi with whitish-ochreous rings at apex of joints ; posterior legs ochreous-whitish, tarsal joints somewhat infuscated at base. Forewings moderate, posteriorly dilated, costa gently arched, apex rounded, hindmargin obliquely rounded; pale ochreous, coarsely and suffusedly irrorated with fuscous ; costal edge suffusedly dark fuscous, interrupted by a very small pale ochreous spot in middle, and a rather larger one at 3/4; a dark fuscous spot at base of costa, and a linear mark along base of inner margin ; a short linear dark fuscous mark along fold near base; a very small round dark fuscous spot in disc at 1/3, and a rather larger subquadrate spot below and slightly beyond it, both margined anteriorly and posteriorly with pale ochreous ; an irregular subquadrate suffused dark fuscous spot in disc beyond middle, similarly margined ; between this and first discal spot is a short longitudinal dark fuscous streak ; a small suffused dark fuscous spot beyond third discal spot; from costal spot at 3/4 proceeds a slender irregular outwards-curved pale ochreous line to before anal angle, touching this spot posteriorly ; a suffused dark fuscous line along hindmargin and apical fourth of costa, interrupted by pale ochreous dots: cilia whitish-ochreous, mixed with fuscous, with clear whitish-ochreous spots opposite hindmarginal dots. Hindwings light-grey, more whitish-grey towards base, with a distinct crescentic-oval darker grey spot in middle of disc; cilia grey-whitish, with an indistinct grey line near base.

Meyrick stated that this species could be distinguished by the distinct central small, crescent-shaped mark on the hindwings.

== Distribution ==
This species is endemic to New Zealand. It has been observed in the North and South Islands.

== Habitat and hosts ==
This species frequents dense native forest and kanuka dominated scrub. The larvae of G. dinocosma feed on wood.

== Behaviour ==
Adults are on the wing from September until March but are most commonly observed in November and December. Hudson stated he collected the species by dislodging it from Astelia solandri, a plant that often grows on dead trees. Adults are nocturnal and are attracted to light.
