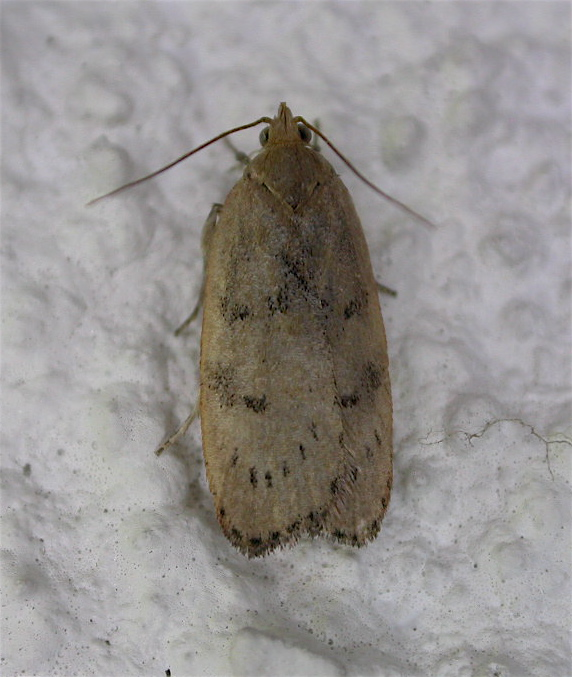

Scientific classification
- Kingdom: Animalia
- Phylum: Arthropoda
- Class: Insecta
- Order: Lepidoptera
- Family: Depressariidae
- Genus: Phaeosaces
- Species: P. coarctatella

Binomial name
- Phaeosaces coarctatella (Walker, 1864)

Synonyms
- Cryptolechia coarctatella Walker, 1864; Phaeosaces liochroa Meyrick, 1891; Cryptolechia liochroa (Meyrick, 1891)

= Phaeosaces coarctatella =

Species of moth endemic to New Zealand

Phaeosaces coarctatella is a species of moth in the family Oecophoridae. It is endemic to New Zealand and can be found throughout the country. The preferred habitat of this species is native forest however they can also be found in domestic gardens. Larvae shelter in hollow twigs or under bark and emerge at night to browse on lichens. They pupate within their shelter. Adults are on the wing from September to January and are variable in their appearance. They vary both in colour, from reddish brown to a greenish yellow shade, and also in the extent of the black marking on their forewings. They are nocturnal and are attracted to light.

== Taxonomy ==
This species was first described by Francis Walker using specimens collected in Nelson by T. R. Oxley and named Cryptolechia coarctatella. In 1988 J. S. Dugdale placed this species in the genus Phaeosaces and at the same time synonymised Phaeosaces liochroa with this species. In 1927 Alfred Philpott studied the male genitalia of Cryptolechia liochroa. George Hudson discussed and illustrated this species in his 1928 book The butterflies and moths of New Zealand under the name Cryptolechia liochroa. The male lectotype specimen, collected in Nelson, is held at the Natural History Museum, London.

== Description ==
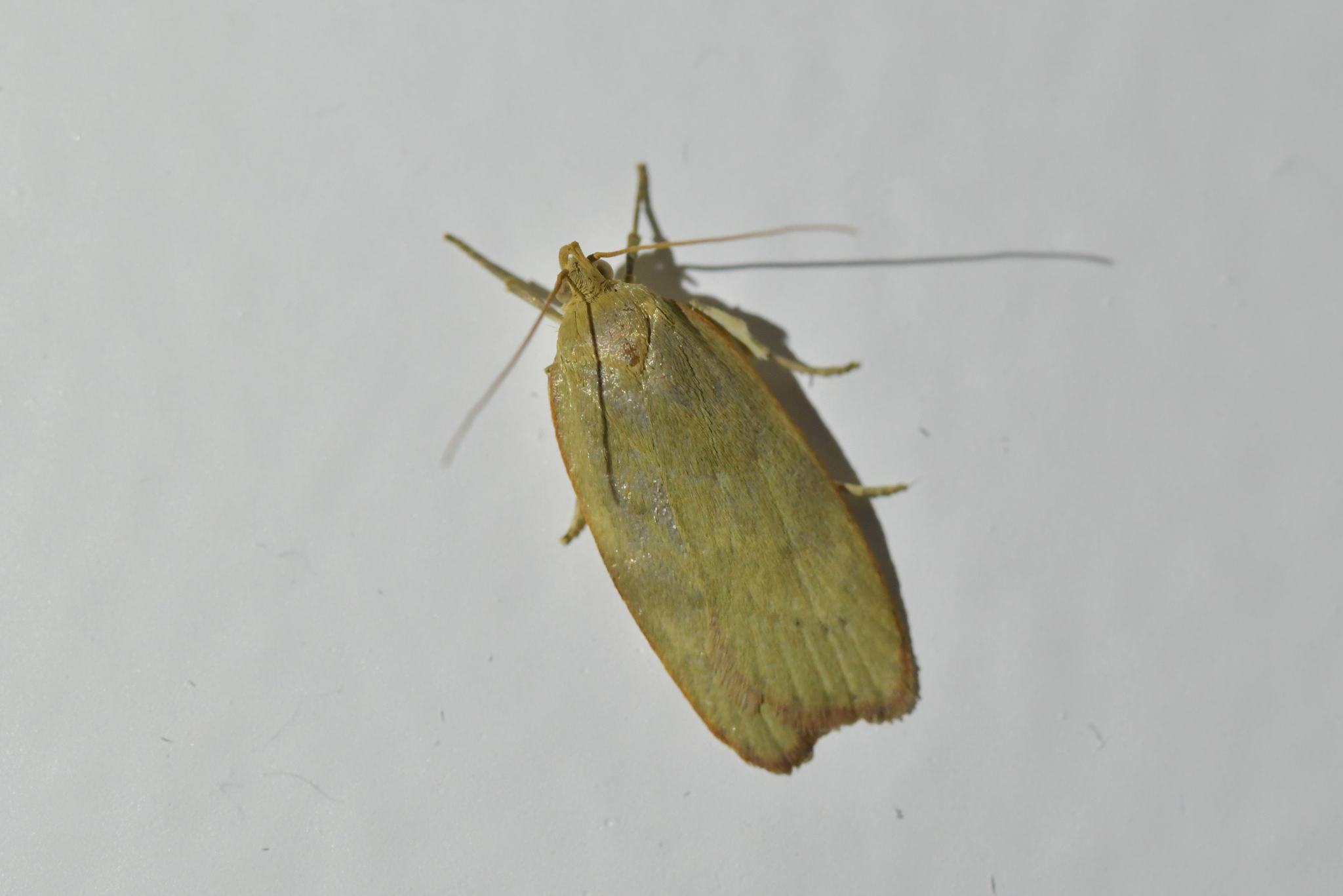
Greenish coloured Phaeosaces coarctatella.

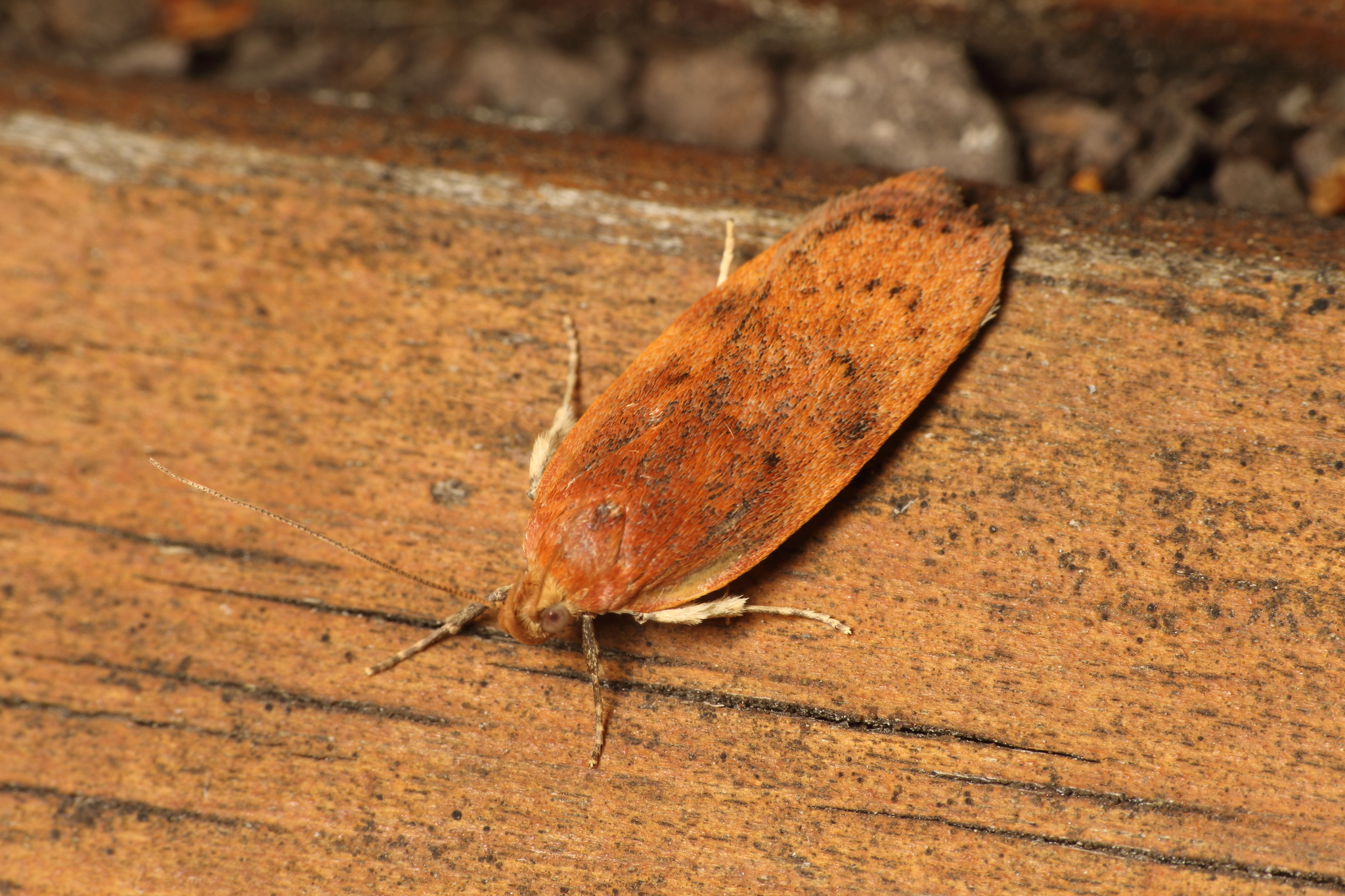
Reddish brown coloured Phaeosaces coarctatella.

Walker described the male adult of this species as follows:

Male, Reddish fawn-colour, paler beneath. Palpi smooth, slender, twice longer than the breadth of the head; third joint setiform, shorter than the second. Antennae slender, very minutely setulose. Hind tibiae slightly fringed. Wings moderately broad, slightly rounded at the tips. Fore wings with two black points in the disk beyond the middle; second point very near the second, but a little hindward and more exterior; exterior border slightly convex and oblique. Hind wings yellowish cinereous, slightly gilded. Length of the body 6 lines; of the wings 16 lines.

P. coarctatella has a wingspan of between 22 and 30 mm and is variable in appearance with some specimens having a greenish shade to their forewings and others being a reddish brown colour. The extent of black shading on the forewings of this species is also variable. The male genitalia of P. coarctatella is extremely long and has over 30 spirals however the reason for this is unknown.

== Distribution ==
P. coarctatella is endemic to New Zealand and are found throughout the country.

== Behaviour ==
Adults of this species are on the wing from September to January. They are nocturnal and are attracted to light. When the adults are disturbed these moths often fall to the ground where they remain motionless. Hudson states that when they are in this position they closely resemble a dead leaf and that this imitation provides the moth with some protection from predators.

== Habitat and hosts ==
This species inhabits native forest and cultivated areas such as domestic gardens. The larvae are lichen browsers and are nocturnal. They shelter in hollow twigs, under bark or old wood-borer tunnels during the day and emerge to feed on epiphytic lichens during the evening. Larvae pupate in their shelter.
