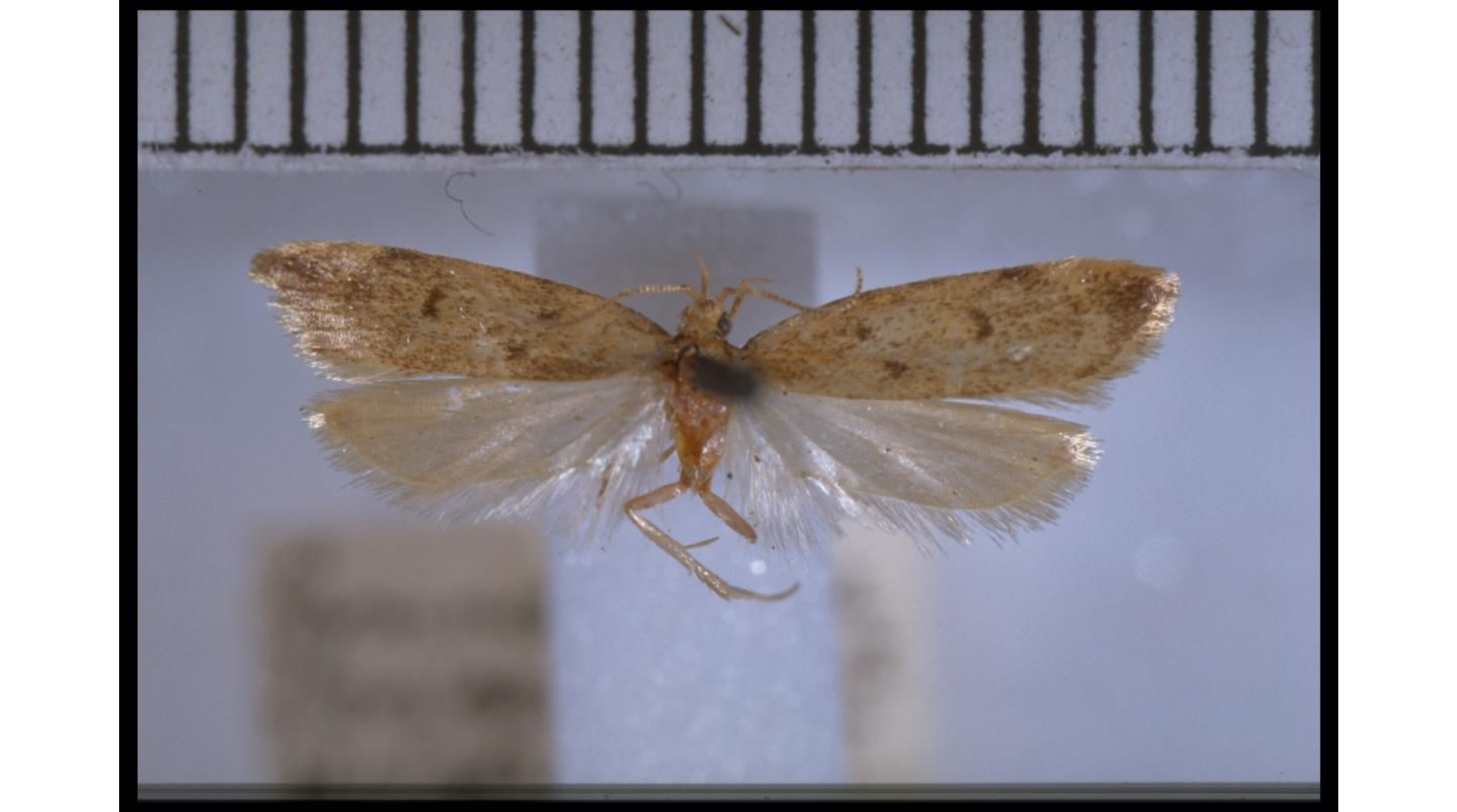
- Male holotype

Scientific classification
- Domain: Eukaryota
- Kingdom: Animalia
- Phylum: Arthropoda
- Class: Insecta
- Order: Lepidoptera
- Family: Oecophoridae
- Genus: Gymnobathra
- Species: G. levigata

Binomial name
- Gymnobathra levigata Philpott, 1928

= Gymnobathra levigata =

Species of moth

Gymnobathra levigata is a moth of the family Oecophoridae. It was described by Philpott in 1928. It is found in New Zealand.

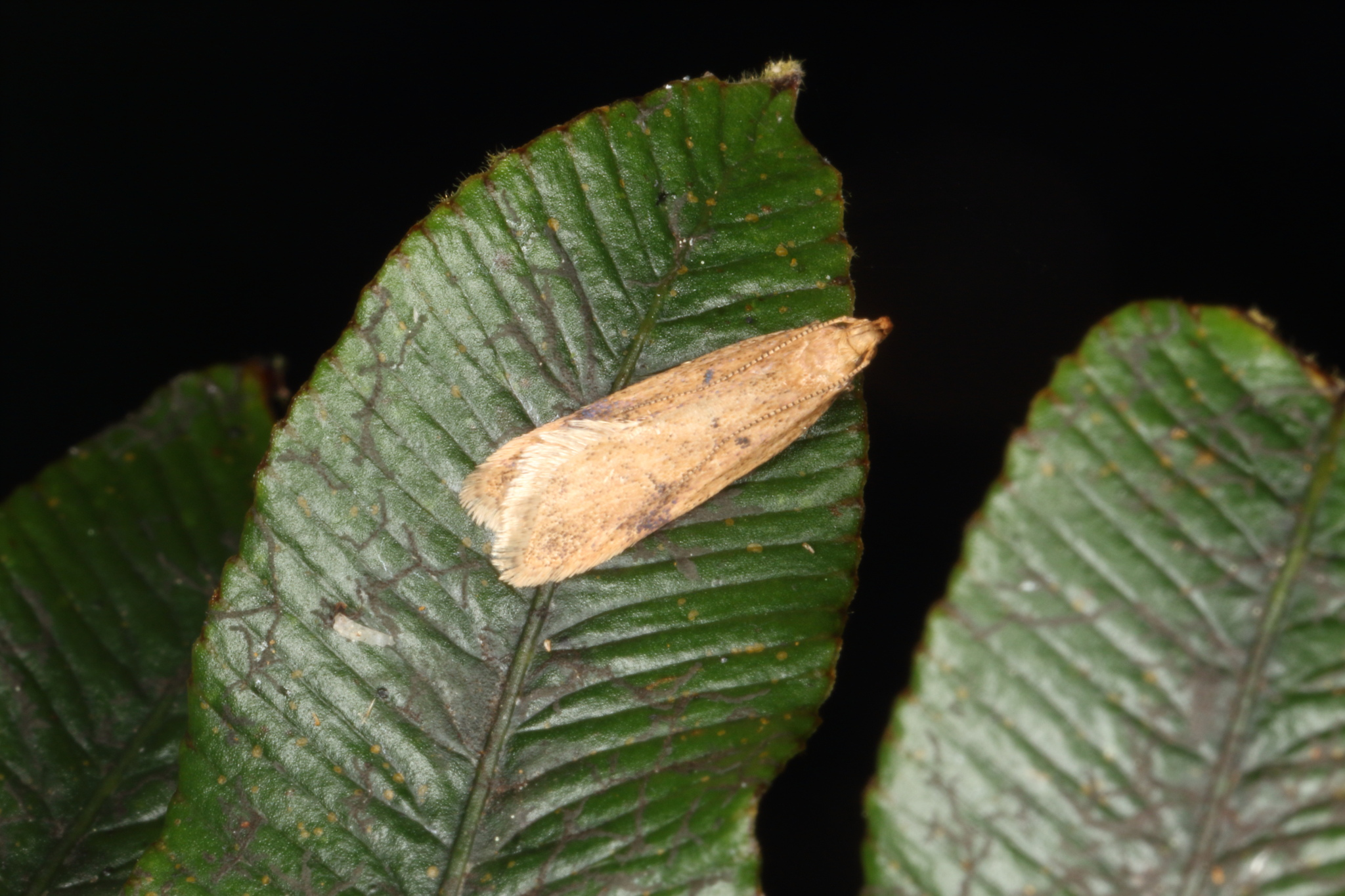
Live specimen of G. levigata.
