= 1973 in paleontology =

Paleontology or palaeontology is the study of prehistoric life forms on Earth through the examination of plant and animal fossils. This includes the study of body fossils, tracks (ichnites), burrows, cast-off parts, fossilised feces (coprolites), palynomorphs and chemical residues. Because humans have encountered fossils for millennia, paleontology has a long history both before and after becoming formalized as a science. This article records significant discoveries and events related to paleontology that occurred or were published in the year 1973.

== Plants ==
=== Conifers ===
Name	Novelty	Status	Authors	Age	Unit	Location	Notes	Images
Pinus arnoldii	Sp nov	valid	Miller	Eocene; Ypresian	Okanogan Highlands; Allenby Formation; Princeton Chert	Canada; British Columbia	A 5-needle pine cone species	
Pinus similkameenensis	Sp nov	valid	Miller	Ypresian	Okanogan Highlands; Allenby Formation; Princeton Chert	Canada; British Columbia	A 5-needle pine needle species	

=== Angiosperms ===
Name	Novelty	Status	Authors	Age	Type locality	Location	Notes	Images
Eorhiza	Gen et sp nov	valid	Robison & Person	Eocene; Ypresian	Okanogan Highlands; Allenby Formation; Princeton Chert	Canada; British Columbia	A semi-aquatic flowering plant of uncertain affiliation The type species is E. arnoldii Possibly a monocot related to Acorus	

== Arthropods ==
=== Insects ===
Name	Novelty	Status	Authors	Age	Unit	Location	Notes	Images
Epiborkhausenites	Gen et sp. nov	valid	Skalski	Bartonian	Baltic amber	Lithuania	An Oecophoridae moth, type species E. obscurotrimaculatus	
Tortricidrosis	Gen. et sp. nov	Valid	Skalski	Lutetian	Baltic amber	Europe	A Tortricidae moth. The type species is T. inclusa.	Tortricidrosis inclusa

== Conodonts ==
Name	Novelty	Status	Authors	Age	Unit	Location	Notes	Images
Protoprioniodus	Gen. nov	valid	McTavish	Lower Ordovician	Emanuel Formation	Australia		

== Archosauromorphs ==
=== New pseudosuchian taxa ===
Name	Novelty	Status	Authors	Age	Unit	Location	Notes	Images
Lisboasaurus	Gen. nov	valid	Seiffert	Middle Jurassic	Guimarota lignite	Portugal	Crocodylomorph	

=== Crocodylomorph research ===
- William Roger Hamilton describes a second specimen of Tomistoma dowsoni from the Siwa Oasis of Egypt.

=== Newly named dinosaurs ===
Data courtesy of George Olshevsky's dinosaur genera list.

Name	Novelty	Status	Authors	Age	Unit	Location	Notes	Images
Efraasia	gen nov	Valid	Galton	Middle Norian	Löwenstein Formation	Germany	basal sauropodomorph	
Kelmayisaurus	gen et sp nov	Valid	Dong	Early Cretaceous	Lianmugin Formation	China	carcharodontosaurid	
Phaedrolosaurus	gen et sp nov	nomen dubium	Dong	Early Cretaceous	Lianmugin Formation	China	described from a single tooth; a dromaeosaurid	
Phyllodon	Gen et sp nov	Valid	Thulborn	Middle Jurassic	Guimarota lignite	Portugal	possible Hypsilophodontid	
Shantungosaurus	gen et sp nov	Valid	Hu	Late Cretaceous		China	largest known ornithischian	Shantungosaurus
Trimucrodon	Gen et sp nov	nomen dubium	Thulborn	Middle Jurassic	Guimarota lignite	Portugal	Ornithischian of uncertain placement	
Tugulusaurus	gen et sp nov	Valid	Dong	Early Cretaceous	Tugulu Group	China	alvarezsauroid	
Wuerhosaurus	gen et sp nov	Valid	Dong	Early Cretaceous	Tugulu Group	China; Mongolia	one of the last stegosaurians	Wuerhosaurus

=== Newly named birds ===
Name	Novelty	Status	Authors	Age	Unit	Location	Notes	Images
Atlantisia elpenor	Sp. nov.	valid	Storrs L. Olson	Late Holocene-Subrecent		Ascension Island	A Rallidae, transferred to the new genus Mundia by Bourne, Ashmole et Simmons, 2003, it is the type species of the new genus.	
Garganoaetus freudenthali	Gen. nov. et Sp. nov.	valid	Peter Ballmann	Early Pliocene	MN 14-15	Italy	An Accipitridae.	
Garganoaetus murivorus	Sp. nov.	valid	Peter Ballmann	Early Pliocene	MN 14-15	Italy	An Accipitridae.	
Gypaetus osseticus	Sp. Nov.	Nomen Nudum	Nikolay I. Burchak-Abramovich	Middle Pleistocene		Soviet Union (Now Georgia (country))	An Accipitridae.	
Ichthyophaga australis	Sp. nov.	valid	Collin J. O. Harrison Cyril A. Walker	Holocene	Chatham Island	New Zealand	An Accipitridae, transferred to the genus Haliaeetus.	
Idiornis gaillardi	Sp. nov.	valid	Joel Cracraft	Eocene or Oligocene	Phosphorites du Quercy	France	A Gruiformes, Idiornithidae Brodkorb, 1965, transferred to the genus Dynamopterus Milne-Edwards, 1892 by Cécile Mourer-Chauviré, 2013.	
Lophopsittacus bensoni	Sp. nov.	valid	David T. Holyoak	Subrecent	Mauritius	Mauritius	A Psittacidae, transferred to the genus Psittacula by Julian P. Hume, 2007.	
Palaeoaramides minutus	Sp. nov.	valid	Joel Cracraft	Middle Miocene	Grive-St.-Alban	France	A Rallidae.	
Palaeorallus brodkorbi	Sp. nov.	valid	Joel Cracraft	Early Eocene	Wasatch Formation	United States (Wyoming)	A Rallidae.	
?Palaeospheniscus huxleyorum	Sp. nov.	valid	George G. Simpson	Miocene	Ysterplaats	South Africa	A Spheniscidae, not for sure a member of the genus Palaeospheniscus Moreno et Mercerat, 1891.	
Porzana astrictocarpus	Sp. nov.	valid	Storrs L. Olson	Late Holocene-Subrecent		Saint Helena	A Rallidae.	
"Primobucco" kestneri	Sp. nov.	valid	Alan Feduccia	Early Eocene	Wasatchian Green River Formatie	United States (Wyoming)	A ?Galbulae the species does not belong in Prinobucco, nor in Neanis, it was transferred to by Feduaccia, 1976, it needs a new genus.	
Quercyrallus quercy	Sp. nov.	valid	Joel Cracraft	Eocene or Early Oligocene	Phosphorites du Quercy, MP 16-28	France	A Rallidae.	
Tyto gigantea	Sp. nov.	valid	Peter Ballmann	Early Pliocene	MN 14-15	Italy	A Tytonidae.	
Tyto robusta	Sp. nov.	valid	Peter Ballmann	Early Pliocene	MN 14-15	Italy	A Tytonidae.	
Wyleyia valdensis	Gen. nov. et Sp. nov.	valid	Colin J. O. Harrison Cyril A. Walker	Early Cretaceous	Weald Clay	United Kingdom	An Enantiornithes Walker, 1981, Enantiornithidae Nessov & Borkin, 1983, known from a single humerus, this is the type species of the new genus.	

=== Newly named pterosaurs ===
Name	Novelty	Status	Authors	Age	Unit	Location	Notes	Images
Eudimorphodon ranzii	Gen. et sp. nov.	Valid	Zambelli	Norian	Zorzino Formation	Italy		
Noripterus complicidens	Gen. et sp. nov	Valid	Yang	early Cretaceous	Lianmuqin Formation	China		
