= Epiborkhausenites =

Epiborkhousenites Temporal range: 37.7–Middle Eocene Ma

Scientific classification
- Domain: Eukaryota
- Kingdom: Animalia
- Phylum: Arthropoda
- Class: Insecta
- Order: Lepidoptera
- Family: Oecophoridae
- Genus: †Epiborkhausenites
- Species: †E. obscurotrimaculatus

Binomial name
- †Epiborkhausenites obscurotrimaculatus Skalski, 1973

Single-species extinct genus of moths

Epiborkhausenites is an extinct genus of moth in the concealer moth family Oecophoridae and containing a single species Epiborkhausenites obscurotrimaculatus. The species is known only from Middle Eocene, Bartonian stage, Baltic amber deposits near the town of Palanga in Lithuania.

== History and classification ==
Epiborkhausenites obscurotrimaculatus is known only from one fossil, the holotype, specimen "No. 16,8 IGUW/AWS". It is a single, mostly complete female, preserved as a three-dimensional fossil in transparent yellow amber. The 18×15×7 millimetres (0.71×0.59×0.28 in) amber specimen is from the fossiliferous Tyszkiewicz's Amber Mine which is located near the seaside town of Palanga. While the type description does not mention the geologic age of the amber, dating of the material based on the microfauna inclusions present gives a date of 37.7 mya. The type specimen is currently preserved in the Palaeozoological Laboratory amber collections housed in the University of Warsaw, located in Warsaw, Poland. Epiborkhausenites was first studied by Andrzej W. Skalski of Częstochowa, Poland, with his 1973 type description being published in the journal Acta Palaeontologica Polonica. The generic name was coined by Skalski in reference to the similarity of the genus to the related genus Paraborkhausenites. The explanation for the specific epithet obscurotrimaculatus refers the three dark spots that are visible on the fore-wings.

Visual comparison of E. obscurotrimaculatus to other fossil species from amber showed a close relationship with Paraborkhausenites innominatus, Borkhausenites implicatella and B. incertella. Paraborkhausenites can be distinguished from Epiborkhausenites by the vein structuring in the fore wings with Paraborkhausenites having r_{1}, r_{2}, and r_{3} veins which run parallel to each other. In Epiborkhausenites the spacing between the r_{1} and r_{2} is larger than the spacing between the r_{2} and r_{3}.

Based on the observable external character of the wing venation, E. obscurotrimaculatus to the modern species Tubuliferola josephinae, Hofmannophila pseudospretella, Himmacia huachucella, Psilocorsis quercicella and Inga sparsiciliella. Skalski notes that the species Tubuliferola josephinae and Hofmannophila pseudospretella both have a very similar color patterning of spots on the fore wings as that seen on E. obscurotrimaculatus.

== Description ==
The holotype female is considered remarkably well preserved and complete, missing only the palpi labiales which were possibly plucked. The underside of the abdomen is obscured by a delicate milky coating. One of the hind wings shows a deformation due to folding. The 4.3 millimetres (0.17 in) fore wings are a little over 3 times as long as they are wide and have a blunt tip. The hindwings are slightly narrower than the forewings. The fore wings show a well preserved and distinct color pattering, each with a larger dark spot present near the transversal vein and two positioned on the basal half of the wing. This color patterning was the first observed on a microlepidopteran fossil in amber.
