= Eutreptornis =

Eutreptornis Temporal range: Late Eocene

Scientific classification
- Domain: Eukaryota
- Kingdom: Animalia
- Phylum: Chordata
- Class: Aves
- Order: Cariamiformes (?)
- Family: †Bathornithidae (?)
- Genus: †Eutreptornis; Cracraft, 1971
- Species: †E. uintae

Binomial name
- †Eutreptornis uintae (Cracraft, 1971)

Extinct genus of birds

Eutreptornis ("changing bird")is a genus of extinct possible cariamiforme bird from the Late Eocene of Utah. It is traditionally considered to be a bathornithid, though a combination of the relative incompleteness of the material alongside some differences from other bathornithids have raised some suspicions about this affiliation.

== Description ==
Eutreptornis is currently represented by a single type species, E. uintae, in turn represented by a tibiotarsus and tarsometatarsus from the Uinta Formation of Utah.

== Biology ==
It is represented by the smallest bathornithid remains known. Due to the incompleteness of its remains it is unclear whereas it was flightless like other bathornithids. It was, however, most certainly a terrestrial predator, perhaps akin to its closest living relatives, the seriemas.

== Ecology ==
Eutreptornis co-existed with a rich mammalian megafauna, such as the brontothere Megacerops, as well as other terrestrial birds, including other bathornithid birds such as the larger Bathornis species and the flightless crane-like geranoidids.
