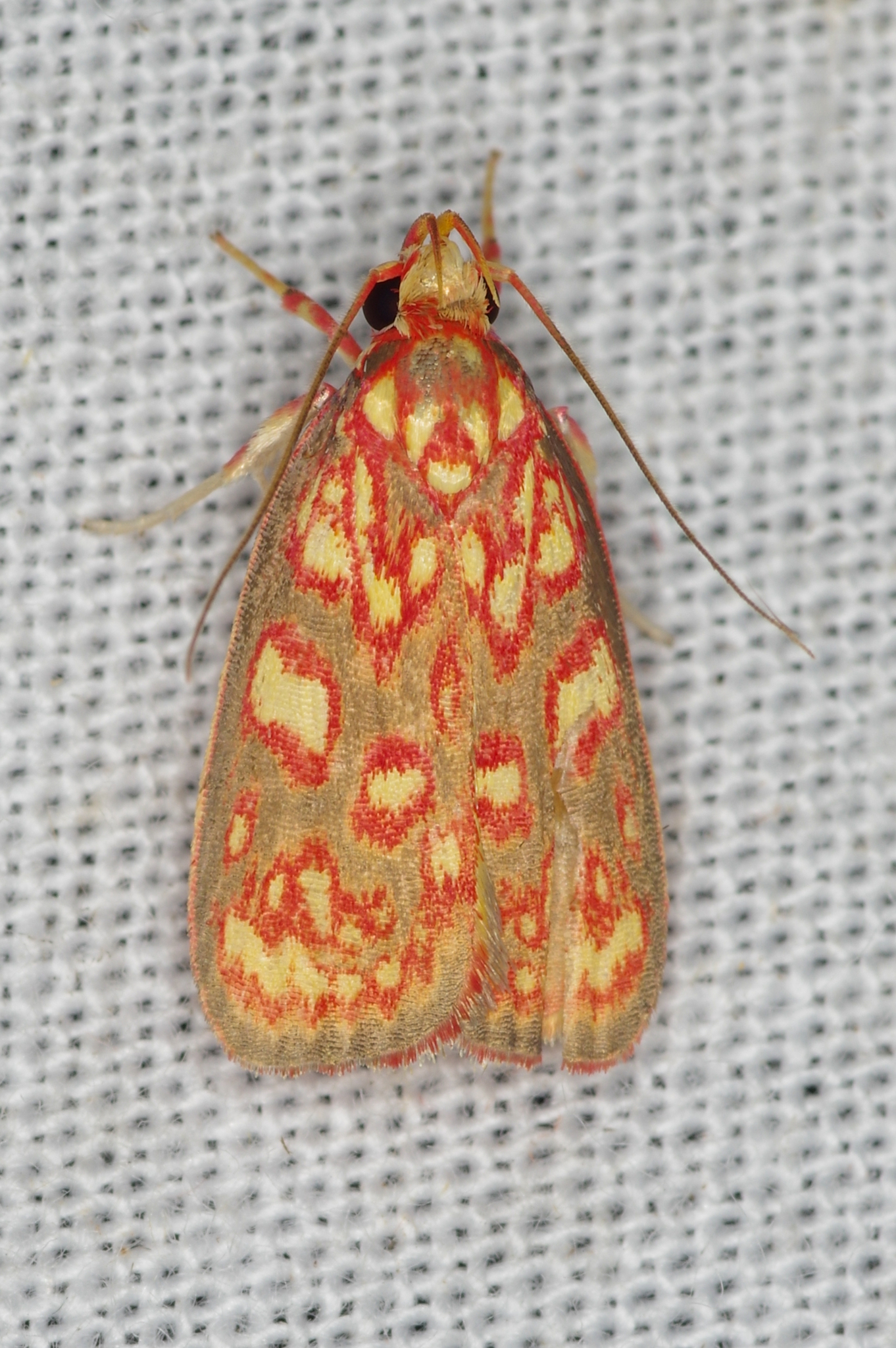

Scientific classification
- Domain: Eukaryota
- Kingdom: Animalia
- Phylum: Arthropoda
- Class: Insecta
- Order: Lepidoptera
- Family: Depressariidae
- Subfamily: Depressariinae
- Genus: Himmacia; Clarke, 1941

= Himmacia =

Genus of moths

Himmacia is a genus of moths in the family Depressariidae.

== Species ==
- Himmacia diligenda (Meyrick, 1928)
- Himmacia huachucella (Busck, 1908)
- Himmacia stratia Hodges, 1974

== Former species ==
- Himmacia languida (Meyrick, 1911)
- Himmacia refuga (Meyrick, 1916)
