= Cenozoic =

Third and current era of the Phanerozoic Eon

- 66.0 – 0 Ma
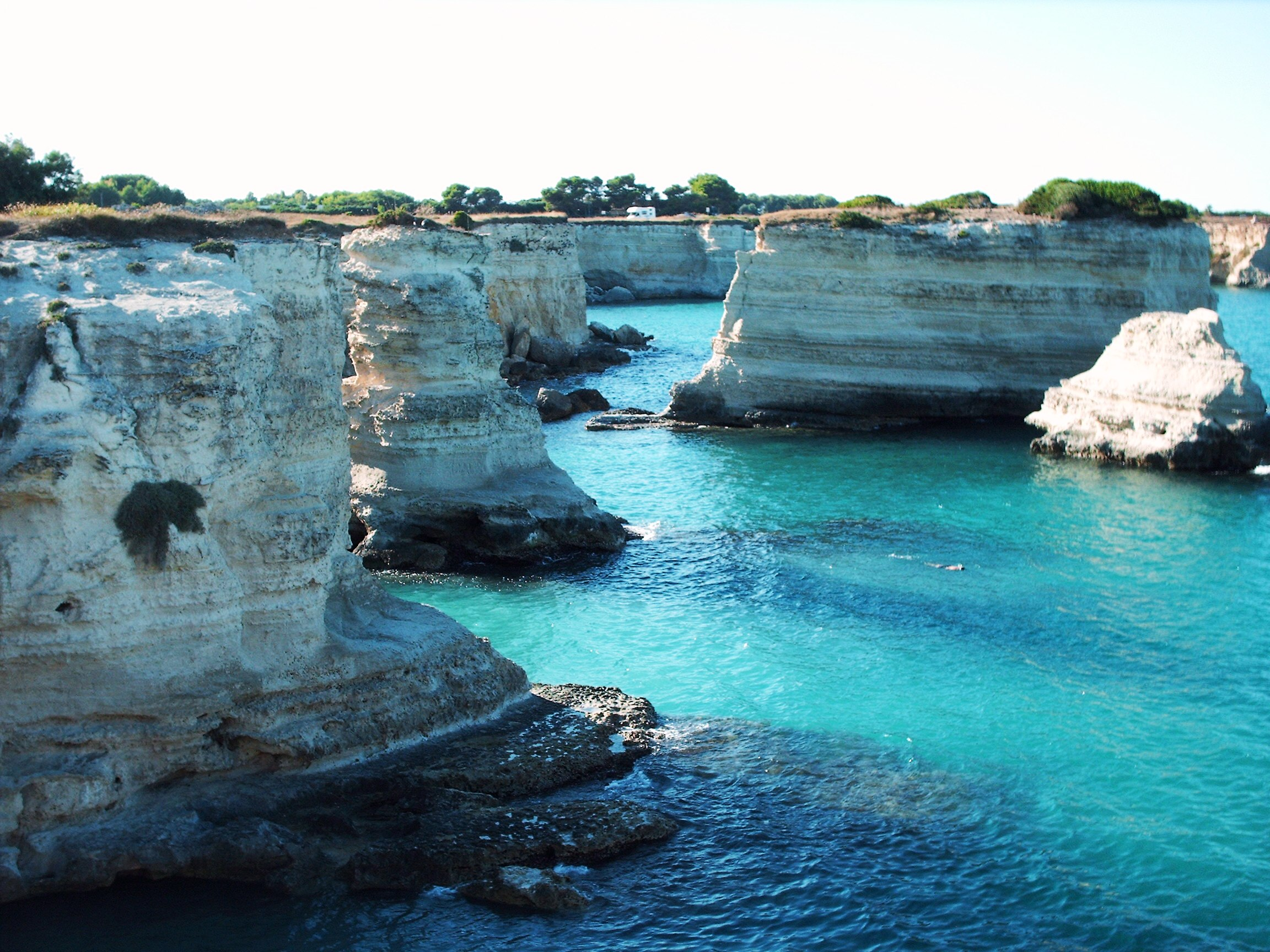
- Rock deposits from the Cenozoic Era (Torre Sant'Andrea, Salento, Italy)

Chronology
An approximate timescale of key Cenozoic events Vertical axis scale: Millions of years ago

Etymology
- Name formality: Formal
- Nickname(s): Age of Mammals

Usage information
- Celestial body: Earth
- Regional usage: Global (ICS)
- Time scale(s) used: ICS Time Scale

Definition
- Chronological unit: Era
- Stratigraphic unit: Erathem
- Time span formality: Formal
- Lower boundary definition: Iridium enriched layer associated with a major meteorite impact and subsequent K-Pg extinction event.
- Lower boundary GSSP: El Kef Section, El Kef, Tunisia; 36.1537°N 8.6486°E
- Lower GSSP ratified: 1991
- Upper boundary definition: N/A
- Upper boundary GSSP: N/A
- Upper GSSP ratified: N/A

The Cenozoic Era (also known as the Caenozoic, Kainozoic, or Neozoic Era; /ˌsiːnəˈzoʊ.ɪk, ˌsɛn-/; SEE-nə-ZOH-ik, SEN-ə-; lit. 'new life') is Earth's current geological era, representing the last 66 million years of Earth's history. It is characterized by the dominance of mammals, insects, birds and angiosperms (flowering plants). It is the latest of three geological eras of the Phanerozoic Eon, preceded by the Mesozoic and Paleozoic. The Cenozoic started with the Cretaceous–Paleogene extinction event, when many species, including the non-avian dinosaurs, became extinct in an event attributed by most experts to the impact of a large asteroid or other celestial body, the Chicxulub impactor.

The Cenozoic is commonly known as the Age of Mammals because the terrestrial animals that dominated both hemispheres were mammals –the eutherians (placentals) in the Northern Hemisphere and the metatherians (marsupials, now mainly restricted to Australia and to some extent South America) in the Southern Hemisphere. The extinction of many groups allowed mammals and birds to greatly diversify so that large mammals and birds dominated life on Earth. The continents also moved into their current positions during this era.

The climate during the early Cenozoic was warmer than today, particularly during the Paleocene–Eocene Thermal Maximum. However, the Eocene to Oligocene transition and the Quaternary glaciation dried and cooled Earth.

== Nomenclature ==
Cenozoic derives from the Ancient Greek words kainós (καινός, 'new') and zōḗ (ζωή, 'life'). The name was proposed in 1840 by the British geologist John Phillips (1800–1874), who originally spelled it Kainozoic. The era is also known as the Cænozoic, Caenozoic, or Cainozoic (/ˌkaɪ.nəˈzoʊ.ɪk, ˌkeɪ-/).

In name, the Cenozoic (lit. 'new life') is comparable to the preceding Mesozoic ('middle life') and Paleozoic ('old life') Eras, as well as to the Proterozoic ('earlier life') Eon.

== Divisions ==
The Cenozoic is divided into three periods: the Paleogene, Neogene, and Quaternary; and seven epochs: the Paleocene, Eocene, Oligocene, Miocene, Pliocene, Pleistocene, and Holocene. The Quaternary Period was officially recognised by the International Commission on Stratigraphy in June 2009. In 2004, the Tertiary Period was officially replaced by the Paleogene and Neogene Periods. The common use of epochs during the Cenozoic helps palaeontologists better organise and group the many significant events that occurred during this comparatively short interval of time. Knowledge of this era is more detailed than any other era because of the relatively young, well-preserved rocks associated with it.

=== Paleogene ===
The Paleogene spans from the extinction of non-avian dinosaurs, 66 million years ago, to the dawn of the Neogene, 23.03 million years ago. It features three epochs: the Paleocene, Eocene and Oligocene.

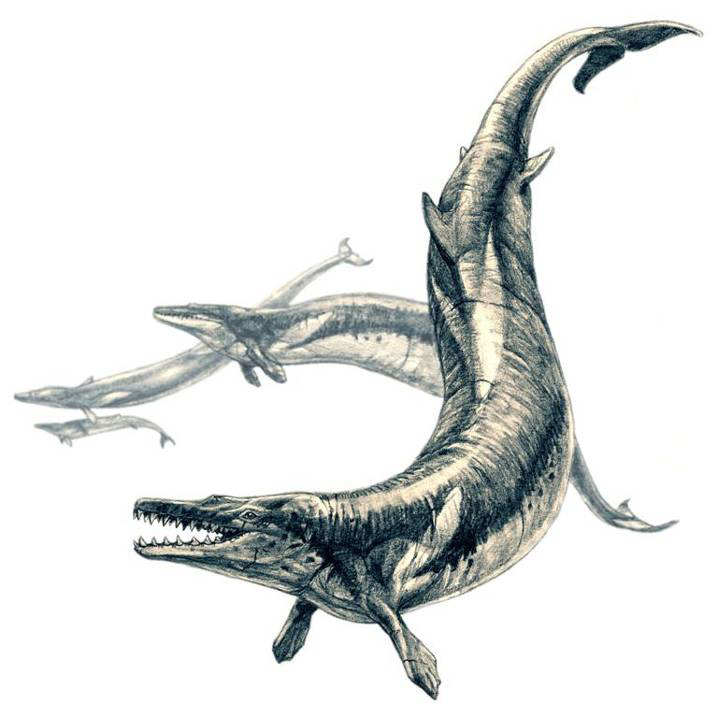
Basilosaurus

The Paleocene Epoch lasted from 66 million to 56 million years ago. Modern placental mammals originated during this time. The devastation of the K–Pg extinction event included the extinction of large herbivores, which permitted the spread of dense but usually species-poor forests. The Early Paleocene saw the recovery of Earth. The continents began to take their modern shape, but all the continents and the subcontinent of India were separated from each other. Afro-Eurasia was separated by the Tethys Sea, and the Americas were separated by the strait of Panama, as the isthmus had not yet formed. This epoch featured a general warming trend, with jungles eventually reaching the poles. The oceans were dominated by sharks as the large reptiles that had once predominated were extinct. Archaic mammals filled the world such as creodonts (extinct carnivores, unrelated to existing Carnivora).

The Eocene Epoch ranged from 56 million years to 33.9 million years ago. In the Early-Eocene, species living in dense forest were unable to evolve into larger forms, as in the Paleocene. Among them were early primates, whales and horses along with many other early forms of mammals. At the top of the food chains were huge birds, such as Paracrax. Carbon dioxide levels were approximately 1,400 ppm. The temperature was 30 °C (86 °F) with little temperature gradient from pole to pole. In the Mid-Eocene, the Antarctic Circumpolar Current between Australia and Antarctica formed. This disrupted ocean currents worldwide and as a result caused a global cooling effect, shrinking the jungles. This allowed mammals to grow to mammoth proportions, such as whales which, by that time, had become almost fully aquatic. Mammals like Andrewsarchus were at the top of the food-chain. The Late Eocene saw the rebirth of seasons, which caused the expansion of savanna-like areas, along with the evolution of grasses. The end of the Eocene was marked by the Eocene–Oligocene extinction event, the European face of which is known as the Grande Coupure.

The Oligocene spans from 33.9 million to 23.03 million years ago. The Oligocene featured the expansion of grasslands which had led to many new species to evolve, including the first elephants, cats, dogs, marsupials and many other species still prevalent today. Many other species of plants evolved in this period too. A cooling period featuring seasonal rains was still in effect. Mammals still continued to grow larger and larger.

=== Neogene ===
The Neogene spans from 23.03 million to 2.58 million years ago. It features two epochs: the Miocene, and the Pliocene.

The Miocene Epoch spans from 23.03 to 5.333 million years ago and is a period in which grasses spread further, dominating a large portion of the world, at the expense of forests. Kelp forests evolved, encouraging the evolution of new species, such as sea otters. During this time, Perissodactyla thrived, and evolved into many different varieties. Apes evolved into 30 species. The Tethys Sea finally closed with the creation of the Arabian Peninsula, leaving only remnants as the Black, Red, Mediterranean and Caspian Seas. This increased aridity. Many new plants evolved: 95% of modern seed plants families were present by the end of the Miocene.

The Pliocene Epoch lasted from 5.333 to 2.58 million years ago. The Pliocene featured dramatic climatic changes, which ultimately led to modern species of flora and fauna. The Mediterranean Sea dried up for several million years (because the ice ages reduced sea levels, disconnecting the Atlantic from the Mediterranean, and evaporation rates exceeded inflow from rivers). Australopithecus evolved in Africa, beginning the human branch. The Isthmus of Panama formed, and animals migrated between North and South America during the great American interchange, wreaking havoc on local ecologies. Climatic changes brought: savannas that are still continuing to spread across the world; Indian monsoons; deserts in central Asia; and the beginnings of the Sahara desert. The world map has not changed much since, save for changes brought about by the glaciations of the Quaternary, such as the Great Lakes, Hudson Bay, and the Baltic Sea.

=== Quaternary ===
The Quaternary spans from 2.58 million years ago to present day, and is the shortest geological period in the Phanerozoic Eon. It features modern animals, and dramatic changes in the climate. It is divided into two epochs: the Pleistocene and the Holocene.

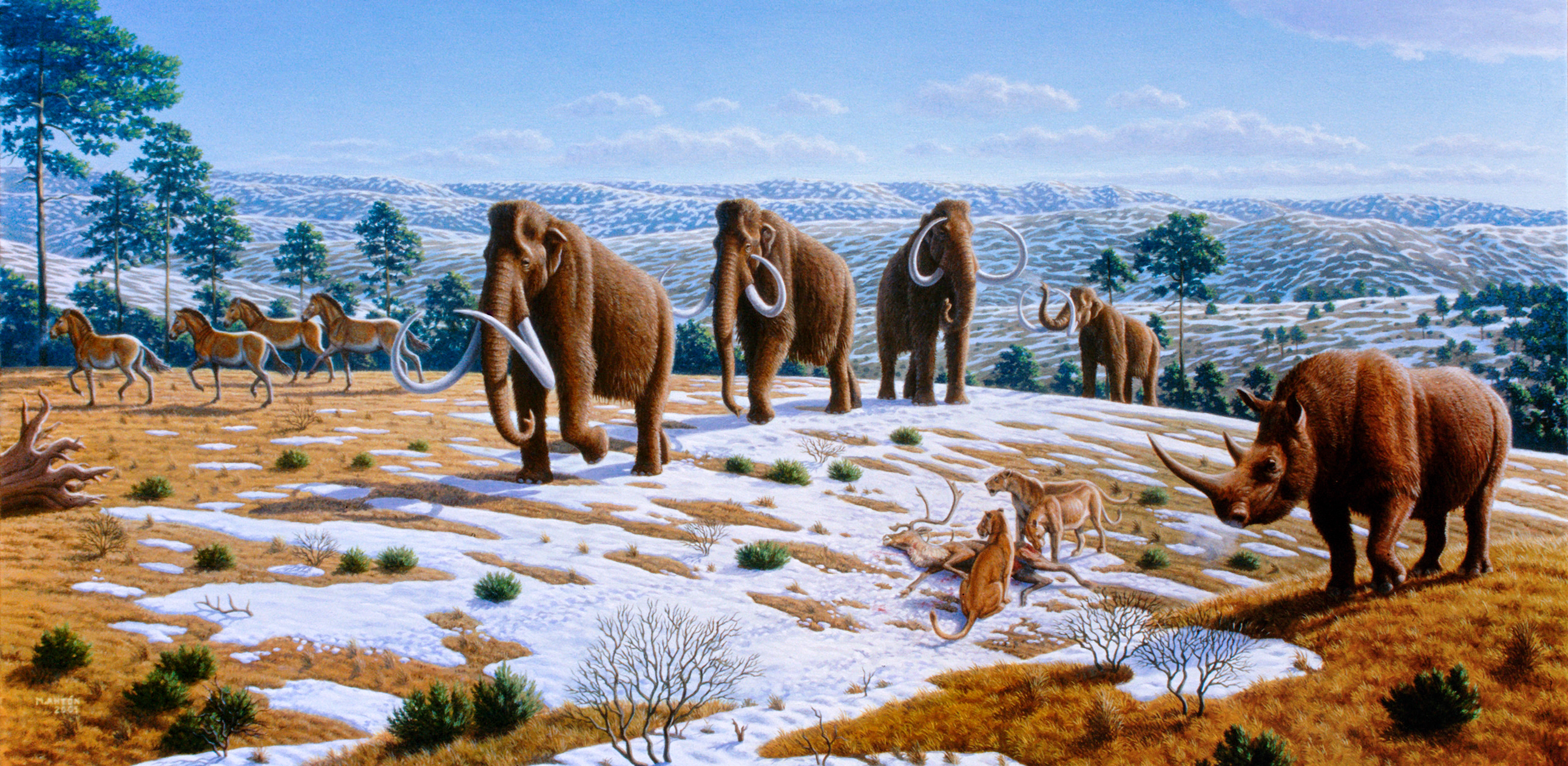
Megafauna of Pleistocene Europe (mammoths, cave lions, woolly rhinoceros, reindeer, horses)

The Pleistocene lasted from 2.58 million to 11,700 years ago. This epoch was marked by ice ages as a result of the cooling trend that started in the Mid-Eocene. There were at least four separate glaciation periods marked by the advance of ice caps as far south as 40° N in mountainous areas. Meanwhile, Africa experienced a trend of desiccation which resulted in the creation of the Sahara, Namib, and Kalahari deserts. Many animals evolved including mammoths, giant ground sloths, dire wolves, sabre-toothed cats, and Homo sapiens. 100,000 years ago marked the end of one of the worst droughts in Africa, and led to the expansion of primitive humans. As the Pleistocene drew to a close, a major extinction wiped out much of the world's megafauna, including some of the hominid species, such as Neanderthals. All the continents were affected, but Africa to a lesser extent. It still retains many large animals, such as hippos.

The Holocene began 11,700 years ago and lasts to the present day. All recorded history and "the Human history" lies within the boundaries of the Holocene Epoch. Human activity is blamed for a mass extinction that began roughly 10,000 years ago, though the species becoming extinct have only been recorded since the Industrial Revolution. This is sometimes referred to as the "Sixth Extinction". It is often cited that over 322 recorded species have become extinct due to human activity since the Industrial Revolution, but the rate may be as high as 500 vertebrate species alone, the majority of which have occurred after 1900.

== Tectonics ==
Geologically, the Cenozoic is the era when the continents moved into their current positions. Australia-New Guinea, having split from Pangea during the early Cretaceous, drifted north and, eventually, collided with Southeast Asia; Antarctica moved into its current position over the South Pole; the Atlantic Ocean widened and, later in the era (2.8 million years ago), South America became attached to North America with the isthmus of Panama.

India collided with Asia 55 to 45 million years ago creating the Himalayas; Arabia collided with Eurasia, closing the Tethys Ocean and creating the Zagros Mountains, around 35 million years ago.

The break-up of Gondwana in Late Cretaceous and Cenozoic times led to a shift in the river courses of various large African rivers including the Congo, Niger, Nile, Orange, Limpopo and Zambezi.

== Climate ==
In the Cretaceous, the climate was hot and humid with lush forests at the poles, there was no permanent ice and sea levels were around 300 metres higher than today. This continued for the first 10 million years of the Paleocene, culminating in the Paleocene–Eocene Thermal Maximum about 55.5 million years ago.

Around 50 million years ago, Earth entered a period of long term cooling. This was mainly due to the collision of India with Eurasia, which caused the rise of the Himalayas: the upraised rocks eroded and reacted with CO_{2} in the air, causing a long-term reduction in the proportion of this greenhouse gas in the atmosphere. Around 35 million years ago, permanent ice began to build up on Antarctica. The cooling trend continued in the Miocene, with relatively short warmer periods. When South America became attached to North America creating the Isthmus of Panama around 2.8 million years ago, the Arctic region cooled due to the strengthening of the Humboldt and Gulf Stream currents, eventually leading to the glaciations of the Quaternary ice age, the current interglacial of which is the Holocene Epoch.

Recent analysis of the geomagnetic reversal frequency, oxygen isotope record, and tectonic plate subduction rate, which are indicators of the changes in the heat flux at the core mantle boundary, climate and plate tectonic activity, shows that all these changes indicate similar rhythms on million years' timescale in the Cenozoic Era occurring with the common fundamental periodicity of ~13 Myr during most of the time. The levels of carbonate ions in the ocean fell over the course of the Cenozoic.

== Life ==
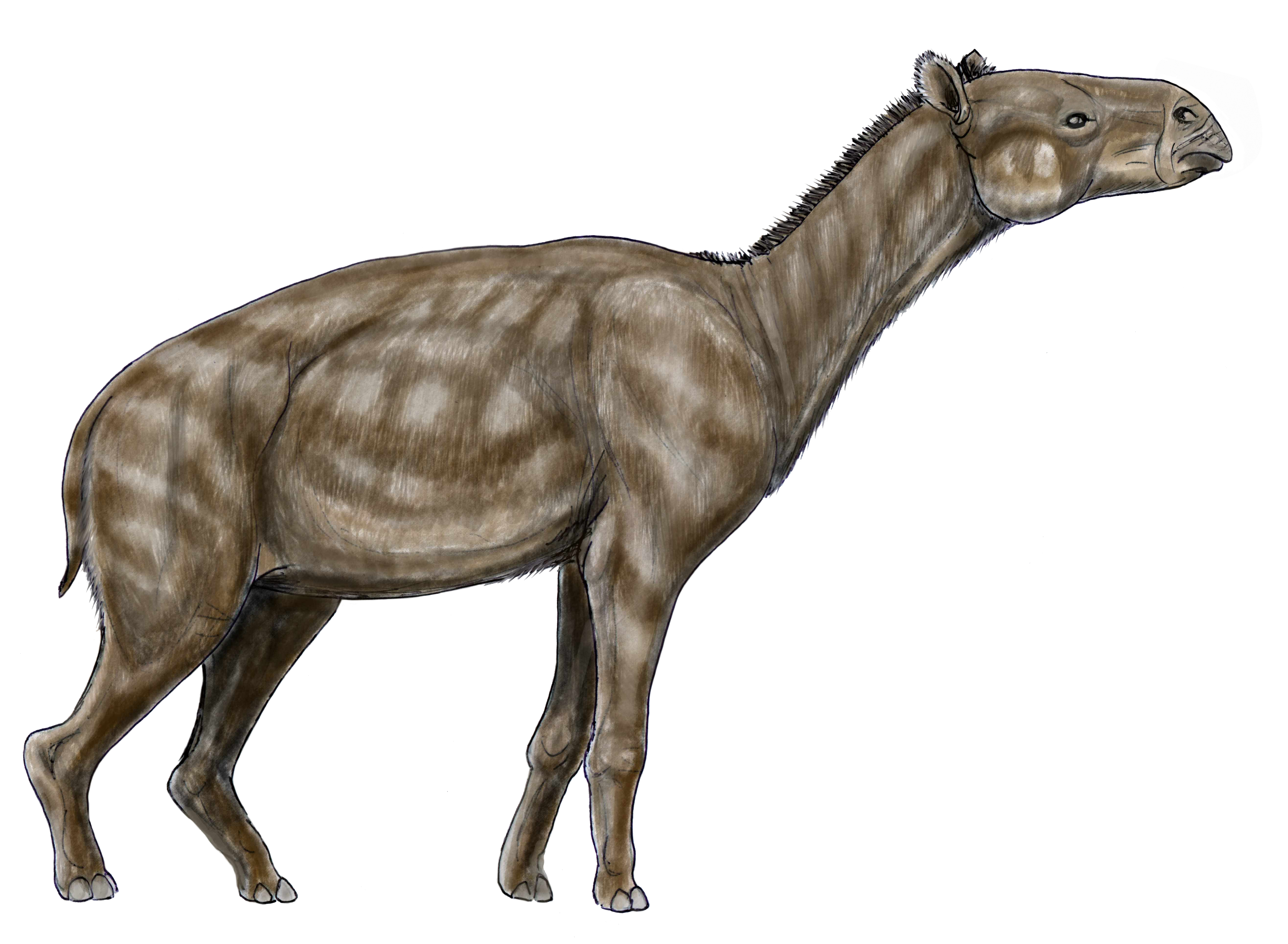
Restoration of Palaeotherium, a Paleogene relative of horses that lived in subtropical climates of Europe during the Eocene

Early in the Cenozoic, following the K-Pg event, the planet was dominated by relatively small fauna, including small mammals, birds, reptiles, and amphibians. From a geological perspective, it did not take long for mammals to greatly diversify in the absence of the dinosaurs that had dominated during the Mesozoic. Birds also diversified rapidly; some flightless birds grew larger than humans. These species are sometimes referred to as "terror birds", and were formidable predators. Mammals came to occupy almost every available niche (both marine and terrestrial), and some also grew very large, attaining sizes not seen in most of today's terrestrial mammals. The ranges of many Cenozoic bird clades were governed by latitude and temperature and have contracted over the course of this era as the world cooled.

During the Cenozoic, mammals proliferated from a few small, simple, generalised forms into a diverse collection of terrestrial, marine, and flying animals, giving this period its other name, the Age of Mammals. The Cenozoic is just as much the age of savannas, the age of co-dependent flowering plants and insects, and the age of birds. Grasses also played a very important role in this era, shaping the evolution of the birds and mammals that fed on them. One group that diversified significantly in the Cenozoic as well were the snakes. Evolving in the Cenozoic, the variety of snakes increased tremendously, resulting in many colubrids, following the evolution of their current primary prey source, the rodents.

In the earlier part of the Cenozoic, the world was dominated by the gastornithid birds, terrestrial crocodylians like Pristichampsus, large sharks such as Otodus, and a handful of primitive large mammal groups like uintatheres, mesonychians, and pantodonts. But as the forests began to recede and the climate began to cool, other mammals took over.

The Cenozoic is full of mammals both strange and familiar, including chalicotheres, creodonts, whales, primates, entelodonts, sabre-toothed cats, mastodons and mammoths, three-toed horses, giant rhinoceros like Paraceratherium, the rhinoceros-like brontotheres, various bizarre groups of mammals from South America, such as the vaguely elephant-like pyrotheres and the dog-like marsupial relatives called borhyaenids and the monotremes and marsupials of Australia. Mammal evolution in the Cenozoic was predominantly shaped by climatic and geological processes.

Cenozoic calcareous nannoplankton experienced rapid rates of speciation and reduced species longevity, while suffering prolonged declines in diversity during the Eocene and Neogene. Diatoms, in contrast, experienced major diversification over the Eocene, especially at high latitudes, as the world's oceans cooled. Diatom diversification was particularly concentrated at the Eocene-Oligocene boundary. A second major pulse of diatom diversification occurred over the course of the Middle and Late Miocene.

== See also ==
- Cretaceous–Paleogene boundary (K–T boundary)
- Geologic time scale
- Late Cenozoic Ice Age
