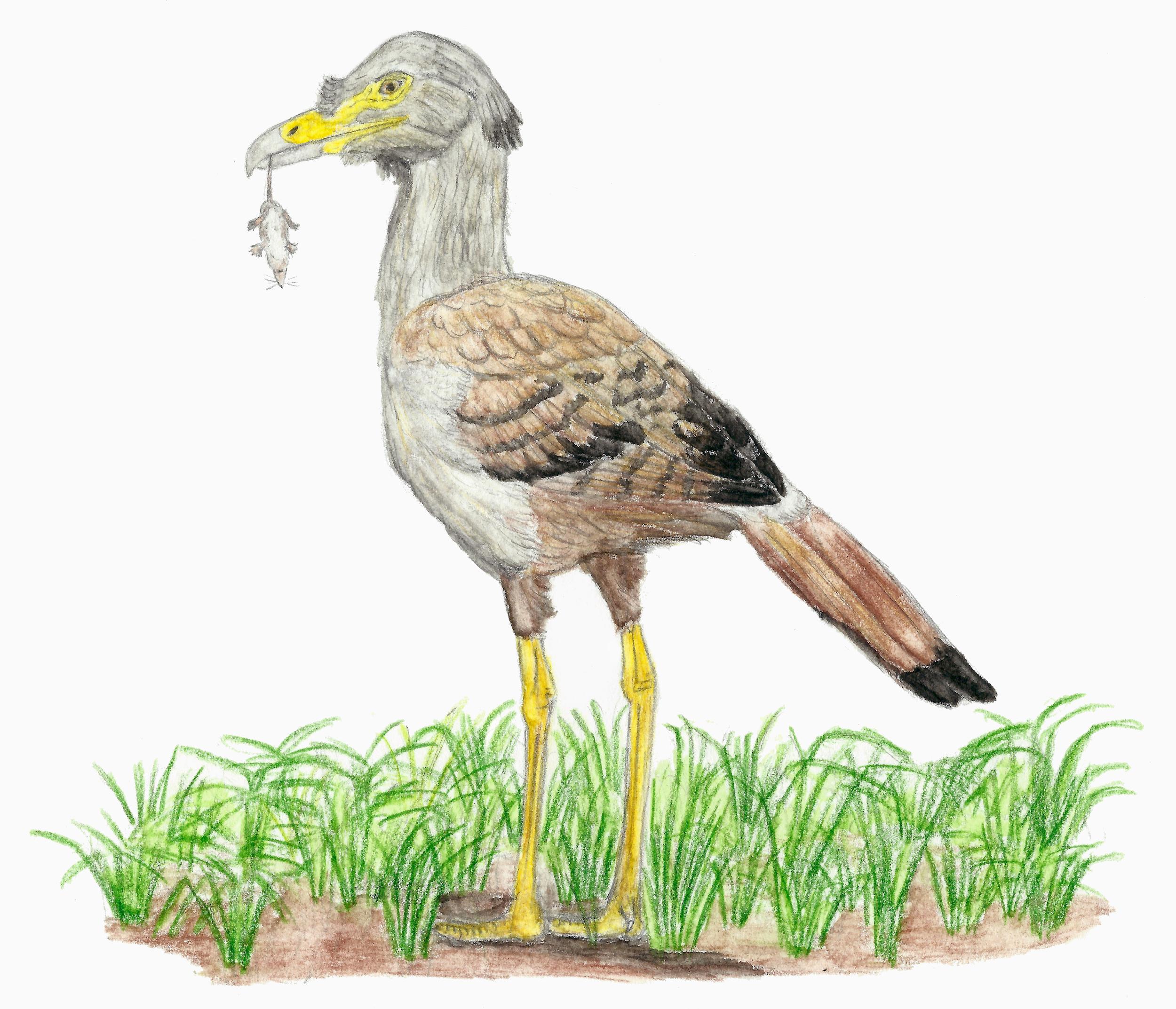
- Depiction of Bathornis grallator.

Scientific classification
- Kingdom: Animalia
- Phylum: Chordata
- Class: Aves
- Order: Cariamiformes
- Family: †Bathornithidae; J. Cracraft, 1968

Genera
- †Bathornis; ?†Eutreptornis; ?†Paracrax

= Bathornithidae =

Bathornithidae Temporal range: Late Eocene to Early Miocene 37–20 Ma

Extinct family of birds

Bathornithidae is an extinct family of birds from the Eocene to Miocene of North America. Part of Cariamiformes, they are related to the still extant seriemas and the extinct Phorusrhacidae. They were likely similar in habits, being terrestrial, long-legged predators, some of which attained massive sizes.

It has been suggested that most, if not all, North American Paleogene cariamiforme fossils are part of this group. Storrs Olson also referred the European Elaphrocnemus to this clade, though it has since been rejected. Conversely, some analysis have instead recovered them as a polyphyletic group, with Bathornis and kin being sister taxa to phorusrhacids while Paracrax is rendered closer to modern seriemas, though this assessment is heavily debated.

The most recent consensus is that Bathornithidae is relegated exclusively to Bathornis, as a clade of Cariamiformes outside of a clade including seriemas and phorusrhacids, as well as a possible European specimen. Paracrax and Eutreptornis are understood to be odd taxa whose cariamiform affinities are not fully resolved. A 2024 study however finds Bathornis as closer to seriemas than phorusrhacids were.

== Biology ==
Though some forms like Paracrax wetmorei might have been capable of flight, most taxa were flightless, constituting examples of flightless birds in mammal dominated environments. Paracrax gigantea, Paracrax antiqua and the larger Bathornis species in particular might have occupied macropredatory niches akin to that of phorusrhacids, the former and latter reaching heights of over 2 m (6 ft 7 in)

Bathornis proper appears to have favoured wetland environments. It was a highly diverse genus, spanning a wide variety of species at various sizes, from the Eocene to the Miocene.
