= Psilocorsis purpurascens =

Scientific classification
- Domain: Eukaryota
- Kingdom: Animalia
- Phylum: Arthropoda
- Class: Insecta
- Order: Lepidoptera
- Family: Depressariidae
- Genus: Psilocorsis
- Species: P. purpurascens

Binomial name
- Psilocorsis purpurascens Walsingham, 1912

Synonyms
- Cryptolechia purpurascens

Species of moth

Psilocorsis purpurascens is a moth in the family Depressariidae. It was described by Thomas de Grey, 6th Baron Walsingham, in 1912. It is found in Guatemala.

The wingspan is about 18 mm. The forewings are purplish grey with a narrow pale cinereous line along the extreme edge of the costa, which is continued along the base of the terminal cilia. Underlying the purplish grey colour of the wing is a faint indication of transverse, striate, pale cinereous mottling. The hindwings are dull brownish cinereous.
