= Inga fervida =

Scientific classification
- Kingdom: Animalia
- Phylum: Arthropoda
- Clade: Pancrustacea
- Class: Insecta
- Order: Lepidoptera
- Superfamily: Gelechioidea
- Family: Oecophoridae
- Subfamily: Oecophorinae
- Genus: Inga
- Species: I. fervida

Binomial name
- Inga fervida (Zeller, 1855)

Synonyms
- Cryptolechia fervida Zeller, 1855; Machimia fervida Zeller, 1855

Species of insect

Inga fervida is a moth in the family Oecophoridae. It was described by Zeller in 1855. It is found in Brazil.
