= Inga crossota =

Scientific classification
- Kingdom: Animalia
- Phylum: Arthropoda
- Class: Insecta
- Order: Lepidoptera
- Superfamily: Gelechioidea
- Family: Oecophoridae
- Subfamily: Oecophorinae
- Genus: Inga
- Species: I. crossota

Binomial name
- Inga crossota (Walsingham, 1912)

Synonyms
- Cryptolechia crossota Walsingham, 1912; Machimia crossota

Species of moth

Inga crossota is a moth in the family Oecophoridae. It was described by Walsingham in 1912. It is found in Guatemala and Mexico.

The wingspan is 24–27 mm. The forewings are ochreous, with a rosy flesh-like tinge, which becomes very narrowly rich salmon-red along the costa and termen, fading out toward the base. There is a slender purplish line, leaving the costa at three-fourths from the base, curves outward, running roughly parallel to the termen and reverting, with a slight bend on the fold, to the dorsum before the tornus. There are a few scales of the same colour forming an indistinct cloud across the end of the cell, and a minute fuscous dot occurs on the middle of the cell at a little less than one-third from the base. There is also a black spot at the base of the costa. The hindwings are bright yellowish ochreous, tinged with rosy flesh-colour toward the apex.
