= Psilocorsis indalma =

Scientific classification
- Domain: Eukaryota
- Kingdom: Animalia
- Phylum: Arthropoda
- Class: Insecta
- Order: Lepidoptera
- Family: Depressariidae
- Genus: Psilocorsis
- Species: P. indalma

Binomial name
- Psilocorsis indalma Walsingham, 1912

Synonyms
- Cryptolechia indalma Walsingham, 1912

Species of moth

Psilocorsis indalma is a moth in the family Depressariidae. It was described by Thomas de Grey, 6th Baron Walsingham, in 1912. It is found in Guatemala.

The wingspan is about 29 mm. The forewings are brownish ochreous, sprinkled with fuscous in a somewhat striate transverse form, the whole having a slight vinous suffusion. A fuscous spot lies at the end of the cell, and a smaller one on the cell half-way to the base. There is a slightly curved shade from the lower angle of the cell, extending to the tornus and there are five elongate blackish spots along the termen, with another in the same series at the apex, and another on the costa above it. The hindwings are pale brownish cinereous.
