= Psilocorsis fatula =

Scientific classification
- Kingdom: Animalia
- Phylum: Arthropoda
- Clade: Pancrustacea
- Class: Insecta
- Order: Lepidoptera
- Family: Depressariidae
- Genus: Psilocorsis
- Species: P. fatula

Binomial name
- Psilocorsis fatula Hodges, 1975

Species of moth

Psilocorsis fatula is a moth in the family Depressariidae. It was described by Ronald W. Hodges in 1975. It is found in North America, where it has been recorded from Texas.
