= Inga roseomarginella =

Scientific classification
- Kingdom: Animalia
- Phylum: Arthropoda
- Class: Insecta
- Order: Lepidoptera
- Superfamily: Gelechioidea
- Family: Oecophoridae
- Subfamily: Oecophorinae
- Genus: Inga
- Species: I. roseomarginella

Binomial name
- Inga roseomarginella (Busck, 1911)

Synonyms
- Cryptolechia roseomarginella Busck, 1911; Machimia roseomarginella Busck, 1911

Species of moth

Inga roseomarginella is a moth in the family Oecophoridae. It was described by August Busck in 1911. It is found in French Guiana.

The wingspan is about 20 mm. The forewings are shining ocherous white with dark brown dusting, and with the entire costa and terminal edge broadly rosy red. The dark brown scales are irregularly sprinkled over the wing with a first and second discal spot basely emphasized. A dark brown line runs from the apical fourth of the costa in an outward curve across the wing to the dorsum. The hindwings are very light lemon yellow.
