= Psilocorsis melanophthalma =

Scientific classification
- Domain: Eukaryota
- Kingdom: Animalia
- Phylum: Arthropoda
- Class: Insecta
- Order: Lepidoptera
- Family: Depressariidae
- Genus: Psilocorsis
- Species: P. melanophthalma

Binomial name
- Psilocorsis melanophthalma (Meyrick, 1928)

Synonyms
- Cryptolechia melanophthalma Meyrick, 1928

Species of moth

Psilocorsis melanophthalma is a moth in the family Depressariidae. It was described by Edward Meyrick in 1928. It is found in Colombia.
