= Himmacia stratia =

Scientific classification
- Kingdom: Animalia
- Phylum: Arthropoda
- Clade: Pancrustacea
- Class: Insecta
- Order: Lepidoptera
- Family: Depressariidae
- Genus: Himmacia
- Species: H. stratia

Binomial name
- Himmacia stratia Hodges, 1974

Species of moth

Himmacia stratia is a moth in the family Depressariidae. It was described by Ronald W. Hodges in 1974. It is found in North America, where it has been recorded from Arizona.

The wingspan is about 20 mm. Adults have been recorded on wing in July and August.
