= Psilocorsis argyropasta =

Scientific classification
- Domain: Eukaryota
- Kingdom: Animalia
- Phylum: Arthropoda
- Class: Insecta
- Order: Lepidoptera
- Family: Depressariidae
- Genus: Psilocorsis
- Species: P. argyropasta

Binomial name
- Psilocorsis argyropasta Walsingham, 1912

Synonyms
- Cryptolechia argyropasta

Species of moth

Psilocorsis argyropasta is a moth in the family Depressariidae. It was described by Thomas de Grey, 6th Baron Walsingham, in 1912. It is found in Mexico (Veracruz, Guerrero).

The wingspan is about 14 mm.
