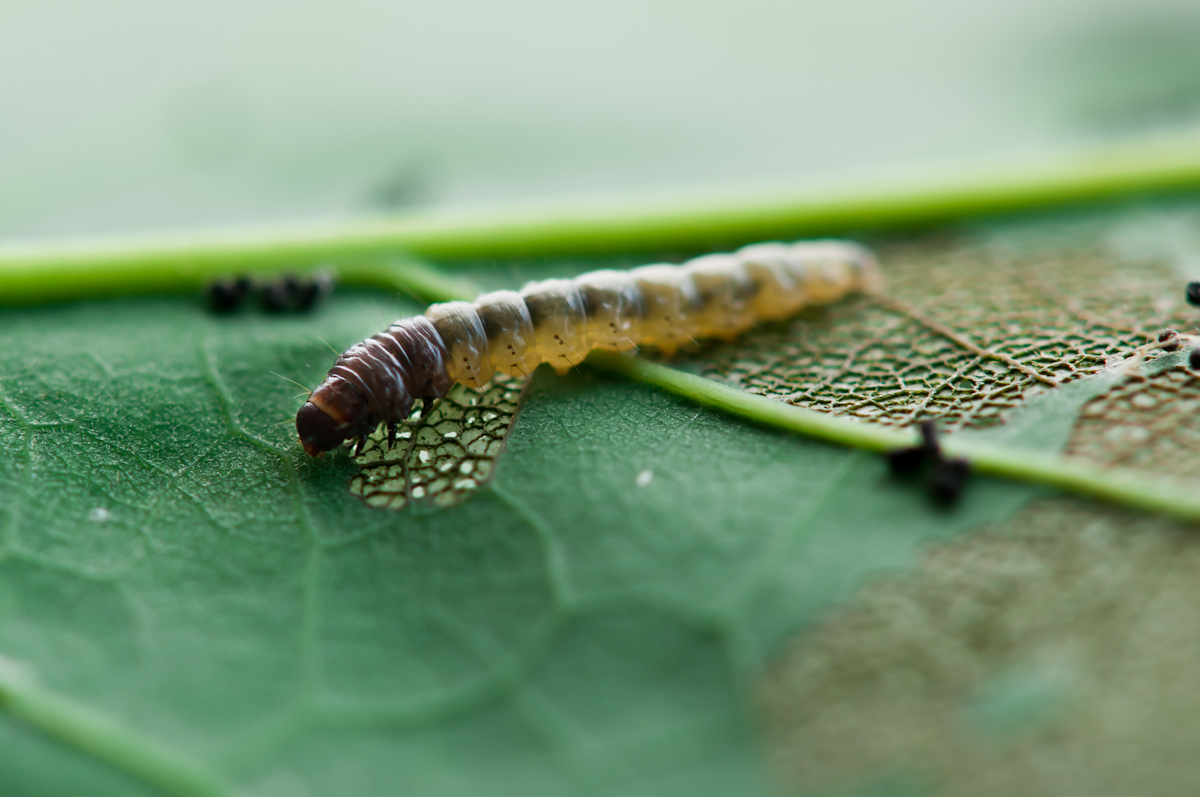
- Larva
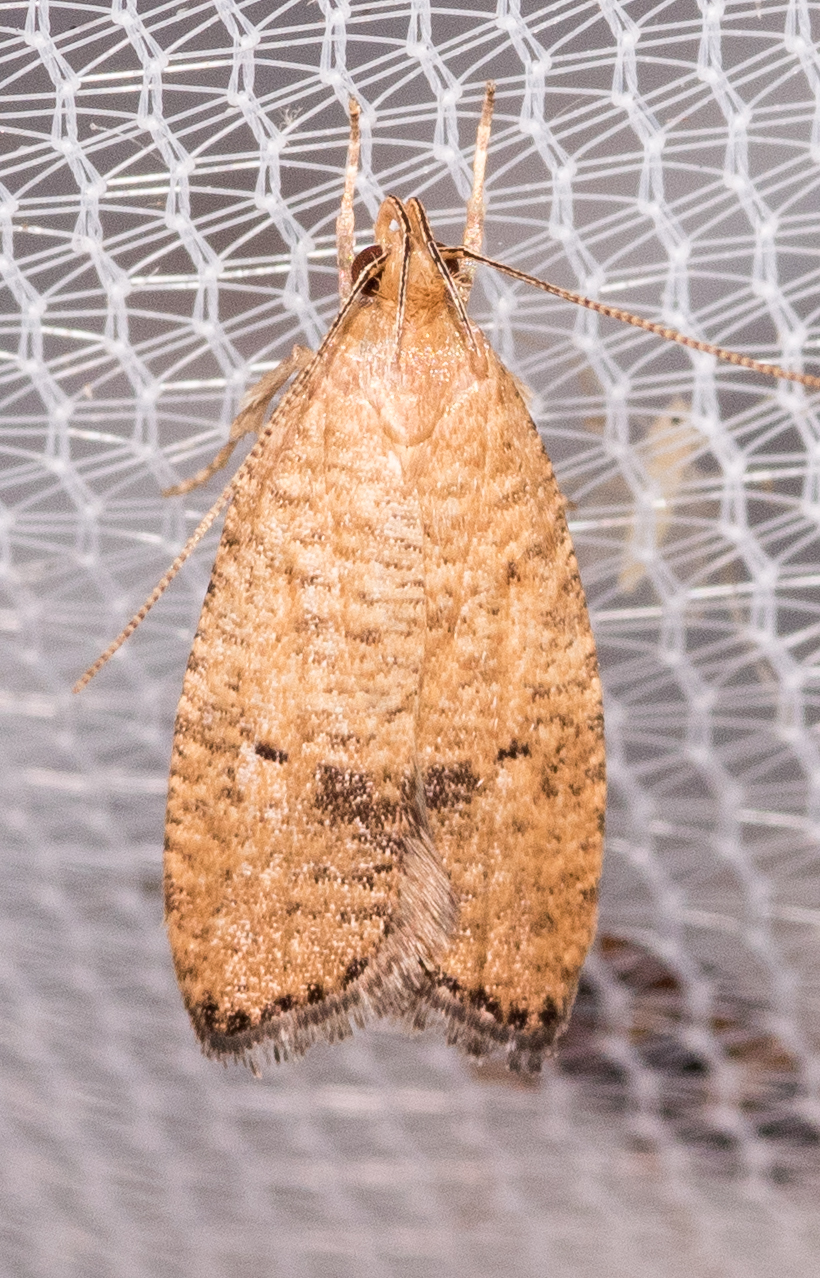
- Adult

Scientific classification
- Kingdom: Animalia
- Phylum: Arthropoda
- Clade: Pancrustacea
- Class: Insecta
- Order: Lepidoptera
- Family: Depressariidae
- Genus: Psilocorsis
- Species: P. quercicella

Binomial name
- Psilocorsis quercicella Clemens, 1860

= Psilocorsis quercicella =

Species of moth

Psilocorsis quercicella (oak leaftier moth or oak leaf-tying psilocorsis moth) is a species of moth of the family Depressariidae. It is found in the United States, including Florida, Maryland, Massachusetts and Oklahoma.

The wingspan is about 14 mm.

The larvae feed on Quercus species. They skeletonize the leaves of their host plant.
