= Psilocorsis exagitata =

Scientific classification
- Kingdom: Animalia
- Phylum: Arthropoda
- Class: Insecta
- Order: Lepidoptera
- Family: Depressariidae
- Genus: Psilocorsis
- Species: P. exagitata

Binomial name
- Psilocorsis exagitata (Meyrick, 1926)

Synonyms
- Cryptolechia exagitata Meyrick, 1926

Species of moth

Psilocorsis exagitata is a moth in the family Depressariidae. It was described by Edward Meyrick in 1926. It is found in Colombia.

The wingspan is about 17 mm. The forewings are dark purplish grey with broad antemedian and ante-apical slightly oblique fasciae of whitish transverse strigulae, on the costa becoming blotches of ochreous-yellow marbling. The hindwings are grey.
