= Inga incensatella =

Scientific classification
- Kingdom: Animalia
- Phylum: Arthropoda
- Class: Insecta
- Order: Lepidoptera
- Superfamily: Gelechioidea
- Family: Oecophoridae
- Subfamily: Oecophorinae
- Genus: Inga
- Species: I. incensatella

Binomial name
- Inga incensatella (Walker, 1864)

Synonyms
- Cryptolechia incensatella Walker, 1864; Machimia incensatella Walker, 1864

Species of moth

Inga incensatella is a moth in the family Oecophoridae. It was described by Francis Walker in 1864. It is found in Venezuela and Guyana.
