= Psilocorsis propriella =

Scientific classification
- Kingdom: Animalia
- Phylum: Arthropoda
- Clade: Pancrustacea
- Class: Insecta
- Order: Lepidoptera
- Family: Depressariidae
- Genus: Psilocorsis
- Species: P. propriella

Binomial name
- Psilocorsis propriella (Zeller, 1877)

Synonyms
- Cryptolechia propriella Zeller, 1877

Species of moth

Psilocorsis propriella is a moth in the family Depressariidae. It was described by Zeller in 1877. It is found in Colombia.
