= Inga flava =

Scientific classification
- Kingdom: Animalia
- Phylum: Arthropoda
- Clade: Pancrustacea
- Class: Insecta
- Order: Lepidoptera
- Superfamily: Gelechioidea
- Family: Oecophoridae
- Subfamily: Oecophorinae
- Genus: Inga
- Species: I. flava

Binomial name
- Inga flava (Zeller, 1839)

Synonyms
- Depressaria (Volucra) flava Zeller, 1839; Machimia flava Zeller, 1839

Species of moth

Inga flava is a moth in the family Oecophoridae. It was described by Philipp Christoph Zeller in 1839. It is found in Colombia, Peru and Brazil.
