= Psilocorsis arguta =

Scientific classification
- Kingdom: Animalia
- Phylum: Arthropoda
- Class: Insecta
- Order: Lepidoptera
- Family: Depressariidae
- Genus: Psilocorsis
- Species: P. arguta

Binomial name
- Psilocorsis arguta Hodges, 1961

Species of moth

Psilocorsis arguta is a moth in the family Depressariidae. It was described by Ronald W. Hodges in 1961. It is found in North America, where it has been recorded from Arizona.

The larvae feed on Quercus hypoleucoides.
