= Inga pyrrhoxantha =

Scientific classification
- Kingdom: Animalia
- Phylum: Arthropoda
- Class: Insecta
- Order: Lepidoptera
- Superfamily: Gelechioidea
- Family: Oecophoridae
- Subfamily: Oecophorinae
- Genus: Inga
- Species: I. pyrrhoxantha

Binomial name
- Inga pyrrhoxantha (Meyrick, 1931)

Synonyms
- Machimia pyrrhoxantha Meyrick, 1931

Species of moth

Inga pyrrhoxantha is a moth in the family Oecophoridae. It was described by Edward Meyrick in 1931. It is found in French Guiana.
