= Psilocorsis cirrhoptera =

Scientific classification
- Kingdom: Animalia
- Phylum: Arthropoda
- Class: Insecta
- Order: Lepidoptera
- Family: Depressariidae
- Genus: Psilocorsis
- Species: P. cirrhoptera

Binomial name
- Psilocorsis cirrhoptera Hodges, 1961

Species of moth

Psilocorsis cirrhoptera is a moth in the family Depressariidae. It was described by Ronald W. Hodges in 1961. It is found in North America, where it has been recorded from Arizona.

The wingspan is about 19 mm. Adults have been recorded on wing in July.
