= Inga crucifera =

Scientific classification
- Kingdom: Animalia
- Phylum: Arthropoda
- Class: Insecta
- Order: Lepidoptera
- Superfamily: Gelechioidea
- Family: Oecophoridae
- Subfamily: Oecophorinae
- Genus: Inga
- Species: I. crucifera

Binomial name
- Inga crucifera (Busck, 1914)

Synonyms
- Psilocorsis crucifera Busck, 1914; Machimia crucifera Busck, 1914

Species of moth

Inga crucifera is a moth in the family Oecophoridae. It was described by August Busck in 1914. It is found from Panama to Peru.

The wingspan is 16–19 mm. The forewings are light yellow with all the veins sharply outlined in wine red. The costal and terminal edges are dark brown and there is a dark brown line from just before the middle of the costa across the wing to the tornus, another dark-brown line from the base to the basal third of the dorsum and then upward to the end of the cell touching the other brown line nearly at right angles, as well as a thin, irregularly wavy, outwardly curved, brown line from the apical third of the costa across the wing to the middle of the dorsum. The hindwings are light iridescent yellow with the margin light rose coloured.
