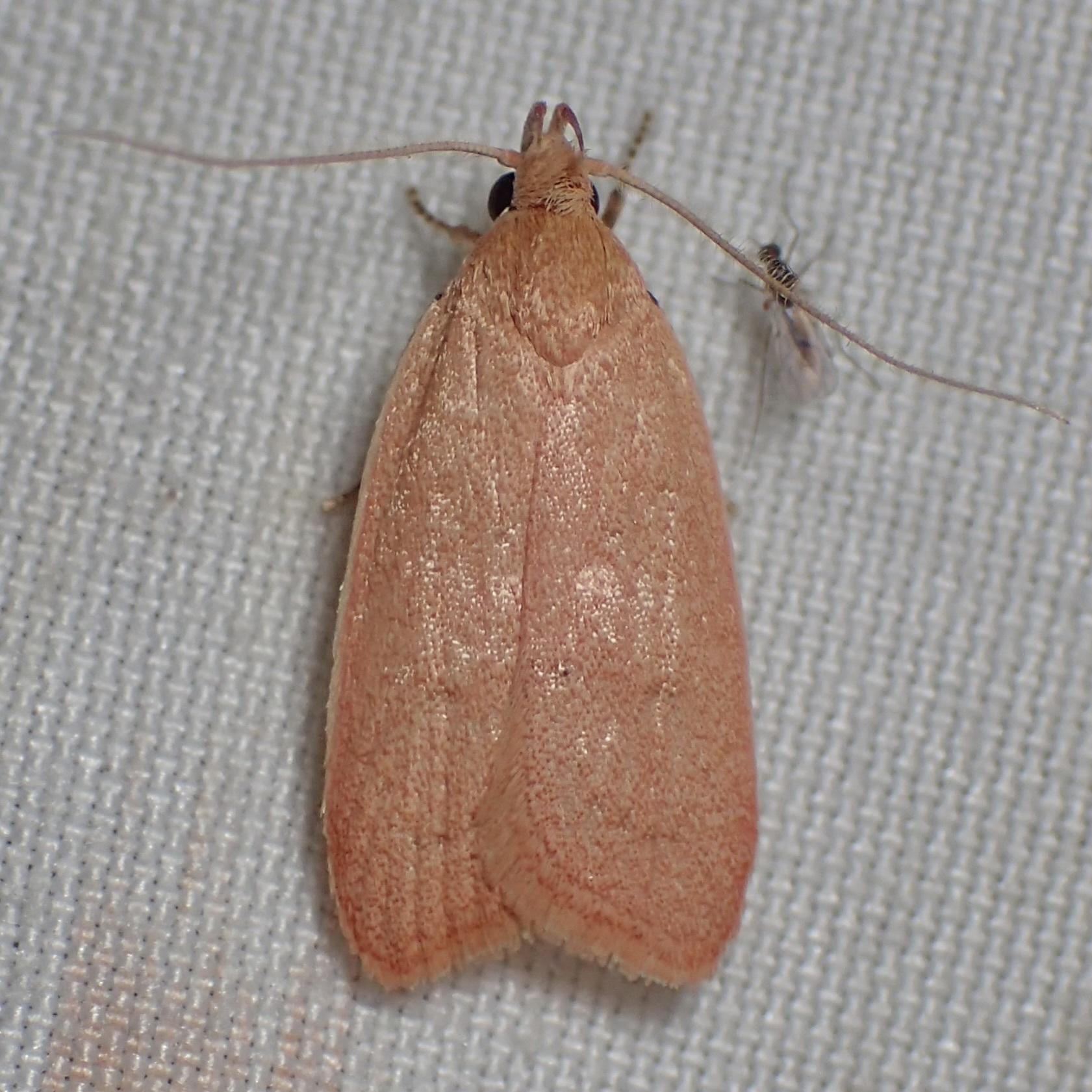

Scientific classification
- Domain: Eukaryota
- Kingdom: Animalia
- Phylum: Arthropoda
- Class: Insecta
- Order: Lepidoptera
- Family: Depressariidae
- Genus: Himmacia
- Species: H. huachucella

Binomial name
- Himmacia huachucella (Busck, 1908)

Synonyms
- Cryptolechia huachucella Busck, 1908

= Himmacia huachucella =

Species of moth

Himmacia huachucella is a species of moth in the family Depressariidae. It was first described by August Busck in 1908. It is found in North America, where it has been recorded from Arizona.

The wingspan is 21–25 mm. The forewings are unicolorous salmon ochreous, the costa slightly more red. The hindwings are light ochreous fuscous, slightly darker around the margins.

The larvae feed on Quercus hypoleucoides and Quercus arizonica.
