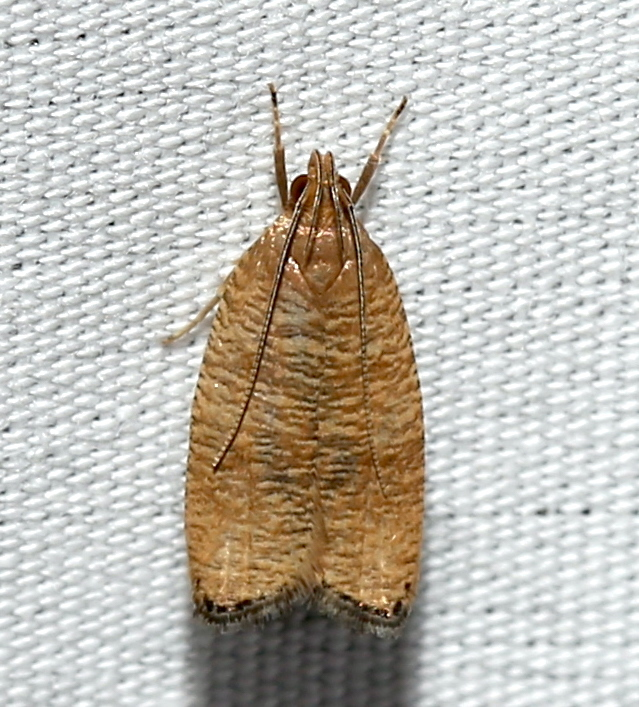

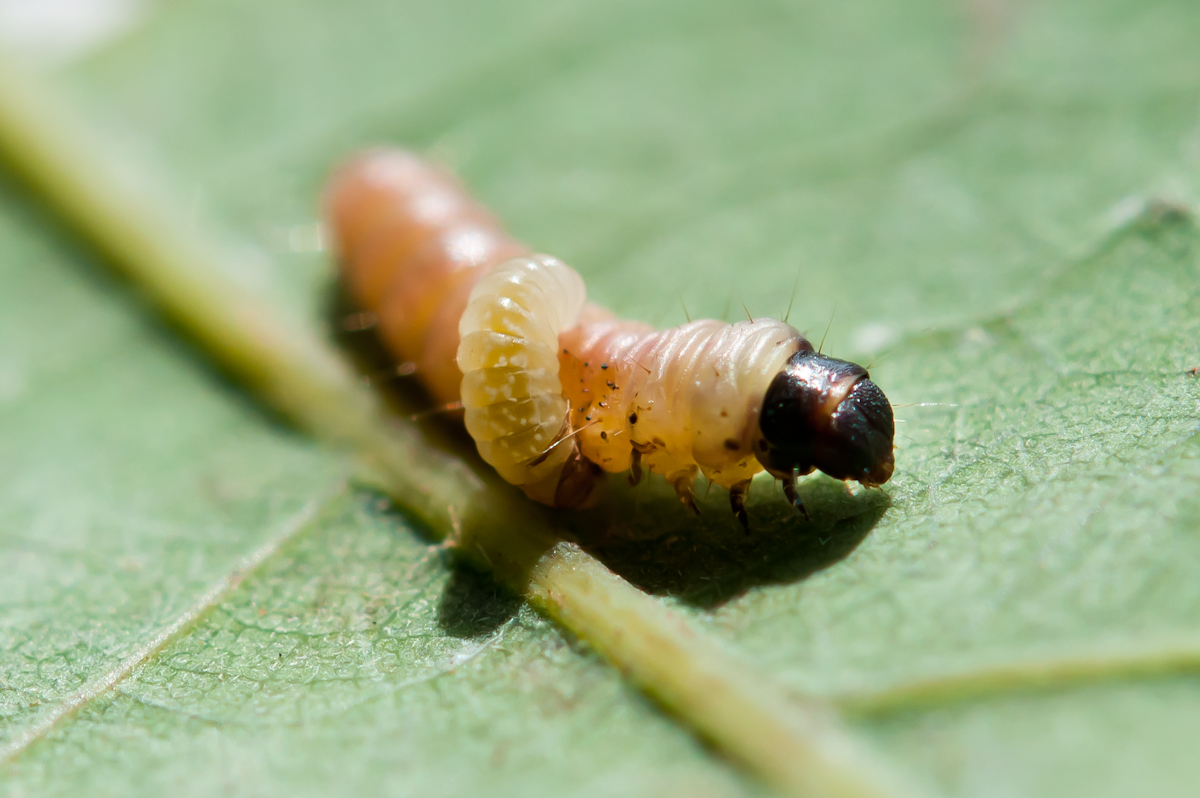
- Psilocorsis cryptolechiella larva with parasite

Scientific classification
- Kingdom: Animalia
- Phylum: Arthropoda
- Clade: Pancrustacea
- Class: Insecta
- Order: Lepidoptera
- Family: Depressariidae
- Genus: Psilocorsis
- Species: P. cryptolechiella

Binomial name
- Psilocorsis cryptolechiella (Chambers, 1872)

Synonyms
- Depressaria cryptolechiella Chambers, 1872; Hagno faginella Chambers, 1872; Cryptolechia obsoletella Zeller, 1873; Cryptolechia dubiatella Zeller, 1877; Cryptolechia cressonella Chambers, 1878

= Psilocorsis cryptolechiella =

Species of moth

Psilocorsis cryptolechiella (black-fringed leaftier moth, black-fringed psilocorsis moth or beech leaftier) is a moth of the family Depressariidae. It is found in the United States, including Alabama, Illinois, Massachusetts, Pennsylvania and South Carolina.

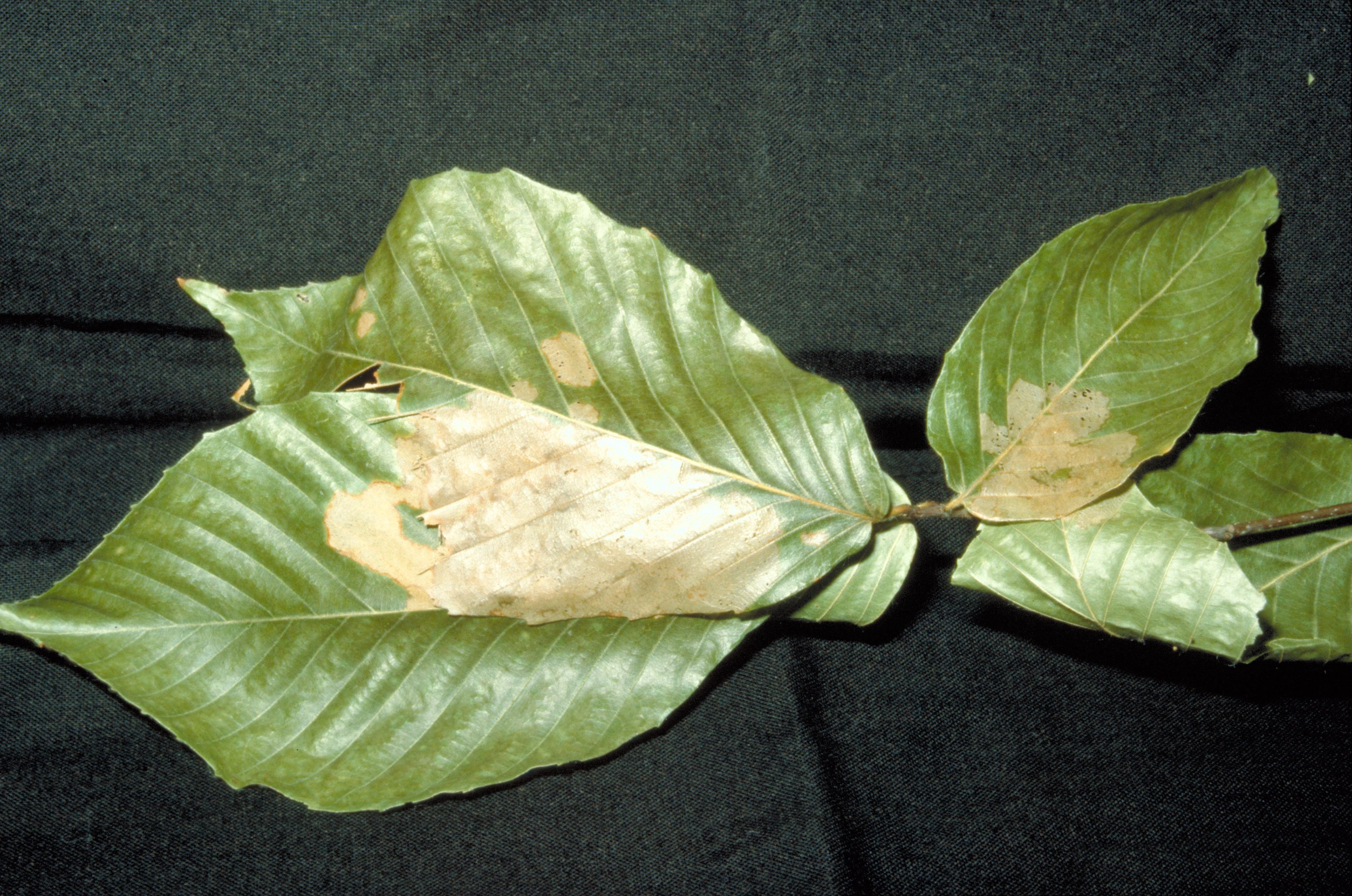
Damage

The wingspan is about 16 mm.

The larvae feed on Fagus species, including Fagus grandifolia. Larvae create a leaf shelter.
