= Inga ancorata =

Scientific classification
- Kingdom: Animalia
- Phylum: Arthropoda
- Class: Insecta
- Order: Lepidoptera
- Superfamily: Gelechioidea
- Family: Oecophoridae
- Subfamily: Oecophorinae
- Genus: Inga
- Species: I. ancorata

Binomial name
- Inga ancorata (Walsingham, 1912)

Synonyms
- Cryptolechia ancorata Walsingham, 1912; Lysigrapha capsaria Meyrick, 1914; Machimia ancorata Walsingham, 1912

Species of moth

Inga ancorata is a moth in the family Oecophoridae. It was described by Lord Walsingham in 1912. It is found in Costa Rica, Colombia, Guyana and Brazil.

The wingspan is about 18 mm. The forewings are light yellow ochreous, the markings dull crimson pink suffusedly sprinkled with purplish fuscous. There are three acute-triangular costal spots, the first basal, nearly reaching the dorsum, the second antemedian, reaching halfway across the wing, connected with the first on the costal edge. The third is found at three-fourths and is smaller, its apex emitting a faint interrupted curved rosy line running to two-thirds of the dorsum. The stigmata are rosy, first the discal indicated by the apex of the second costal spot, the plical very small, obliquely beyond it and the second discal transverse linear. There is a slender attenuated streak running from the third costal spot along the posterior part of the costa and termen to the tornus. The hindwings are whitish yellowish.
