= Psilocorsis carpocapsella =

Scientific classification
- Kingdom: Animalia
- Phylum: Arthropoda
- Class: Insecta
- Order: Lepidoptera
- Family: Depressariidae
- Genus: Psilocorsis
- Species: P. carpocapsella

Binomial name
- Psilocorsis carpocapsella (Walker, 1864)

Synonyms
- Paepia carpocapsella Walker, 1864

Species of moth

Psilocorsis carpocapsella is a moth in the family Depressariidae. It was described by Francis Walker in 1864. It is found in Brazil.

Adults are cupreous brown, the forewings with three broad bands, each formed by numerous transverse slender whitish lines and an elongated white spot near the tip of the costa. The hindwings are cinereous.
