= Psilocorsis minerva =

Scientific classification
- Kingdom: Animalia
- Phylum: Arthropoda
- Class: Insecta
- Order: Lepidoptera
- Family: Depressariidae
- Genus: Psilocorsis
- Species: P. minerva

Binomial name
- Psilocorsis minerva (Meyrick, 1928)

Synonyms
- Cryptolechia minerva Meyrick, 1928

Species of moth

Psilocorsis minerva is a moth in the family Depressariidae. It was described by Edward Meyrick in 1928. It is found in Colombia.

The wingspan is about 40 mm. The forewings are violet, closely striated and strigulated transversely with dark fuscous and with slight indications of some minute whitish-ochreous strigulae on the costa between these. The hindwings are grey.
