= Himmacia diligenda =

Scientific classification
- Kingdom: Animalia
- Phylum: Arthropoda
- Class: Insecta
- Order: Lepidoptera
- Family: Depressariidae
- Genus: Himmacia
- Species: H. diligenda

Binomial name
- Himmacia diligenda (Meyrick, 1928)

Synonyms
- Cryptolechia diligenda Meyrick, 1928

Species of moth

Himmacia diligenda is a moth in the family Depressariidae. It was described by Edward Meyrick in 1928. It is found in North America, where it has been recorded from Texas.

The wingspan is about 25 mm. The forewings are pale rosy, slightly tinged with greyish ochreous. The stigmata is faintly infuscated, hardly traceable. The hindwings are ochreous whitish.
