= Inga analis =

Scientific classification
- Kingdom: Animalia
- Phylum: Arthropoda
- Class: Insecta
- Order: Lepidoptera
- Superfamily: Gelechioidea
- Family: Oecophoridae
- Subfamily: Oecophorinae
- Genus: Inga
- Species: I. analis

Binomial name
- Inga analis (Busck, 1914)

Synonyms
- Cryptolechia analis Busck, 1914; Machimia analis Busck, 1914

Species of moth

Inga analis is a moth in the family Oecophoridae. It was described by August Busck in 1914. It is found in Panama.

The wingspan is 14–15 mm. The forewings are deer brown with brick-red edges. There is a small black dot at the base of the costa and an indistinct black dot at the end of the cell and one on the fold. An indistinct row of black dots is found across the wings parallel with the outer edge at the apical fifth. The hindwings are dark fuscous.
