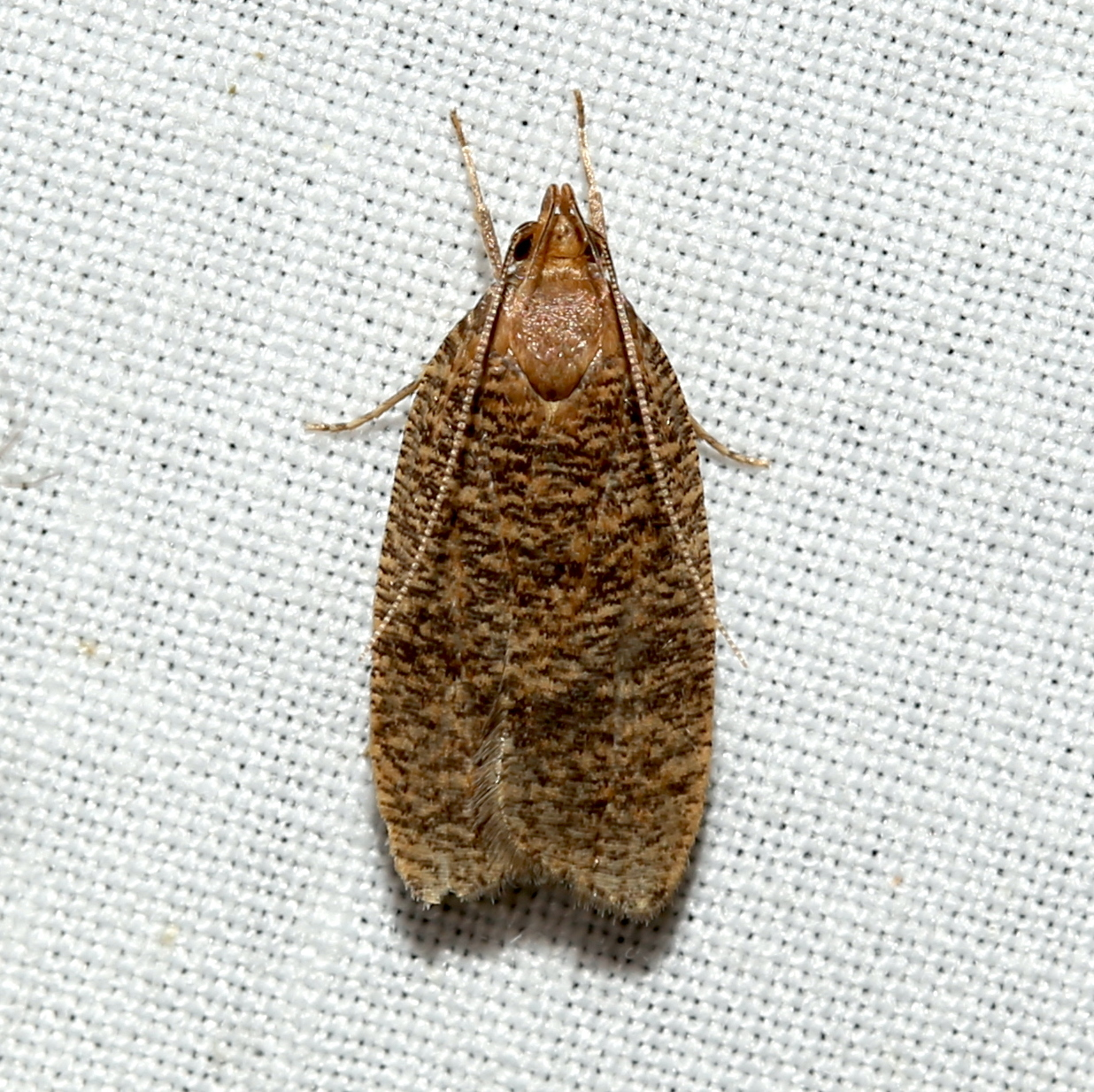

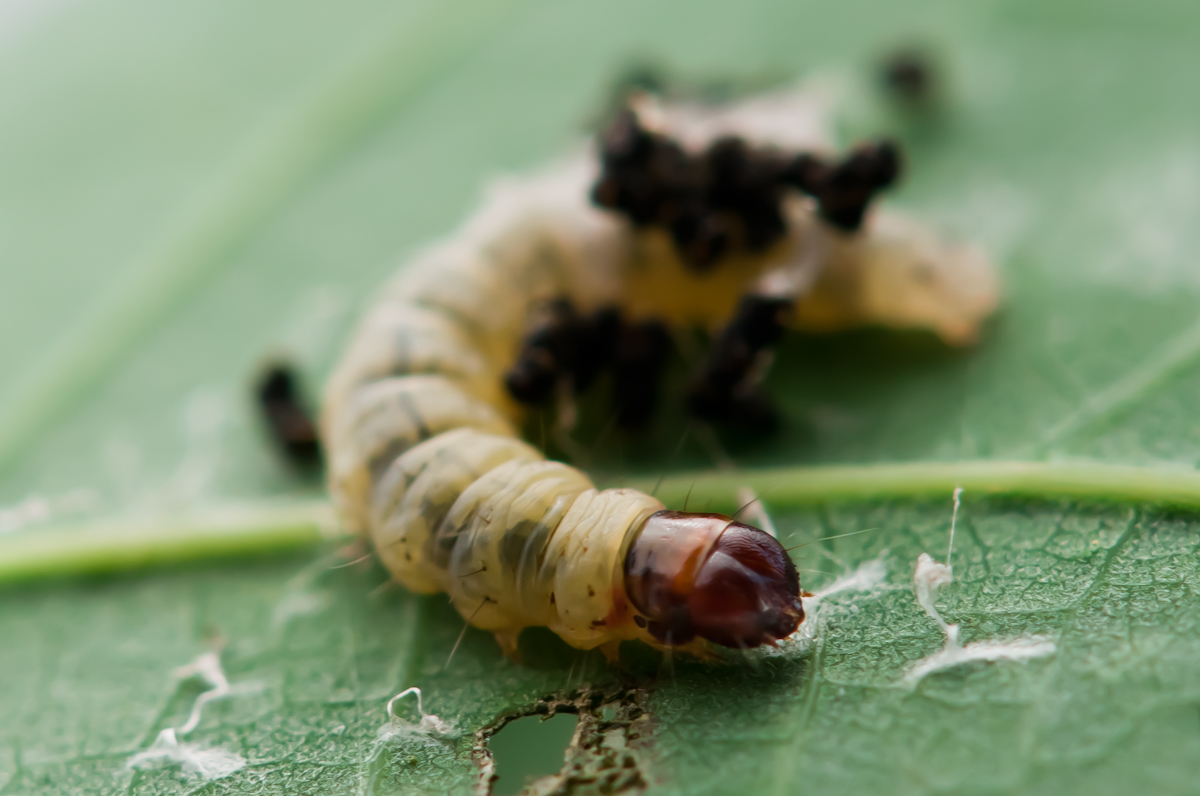
- Larva

Scientific classification
- Kingdom: Animalia
- Phylum: Arthropoda
- Clade: Pancrustacea
- Class: Insecta
- Order: Lepidoptera
- Family: Depressariidae
- Genus: Psilocorsis
- Species: P. reflexella

Binomial name
- Psilocorsis reflexella Clemens, 1860

Synonyms
- Cryptolechia ferruginosa Zeller, 1873; Psilocorsis fletcherella Gibson, 1909; Psilocorsis caryae Clarke, 1941; Psilocorsis reflexa Chambers, 1878

= Psilocorsis reflexella =

Species of moth

Psilocorsis reflexella (dotted leaftier moth) is a species of moth of the family Depressariidae. It is found in North America, including Georgia, Illinois, New Jersey, New York, Oklahoma and Tennessee.

The wingspan is 14–17 mm.

The larvae feed on Quercus species.
