= Psilocorsis amydra =

Scientific classification
- Kingdom: Animalia
- Phylum: Arthropoda
- Class: Insecta
- Order: Lepidoptera
- Family: Depressariidae
- Genus: Psilocorsis
- Species: P. amydra

Binomial name
- Psilocorsis amydra Hodges, 1961

Species of moth

Psilocorsis amydra is a moth in the family Depressariidae. It was described by Ronald W. Hodges in 1961. It is found in North America, where it has been recorded from Arizona.
