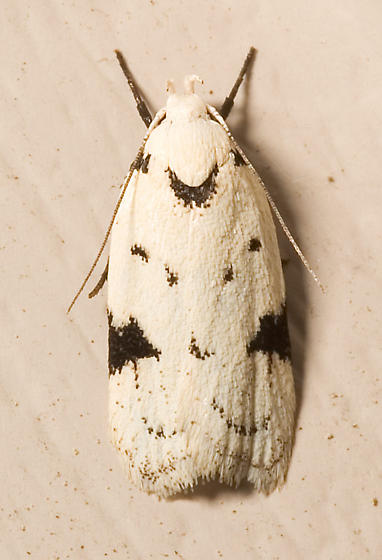

Scientific classification
- Kingdom: Animalia
- Phylum: Arthropoda
- Clade: Pancrustacea
- Class: Insecta
- Order: Lepidoptera
- Superfamily: Gelechioidea
- Family: Oecophoridae
- Subfamily: Oecophorinae
- Genus: Inga
- Species: I. sparsiciliella

Binomial name
- Inga sparsiciliella (Clemens, 1864)

Synonyms
- Anesychia sparsiciliella Clemens, 1864; Cryptolechia contrariella Walker, 1864; Cryptolechia inscitella Walker, 1864; Cryptolechia atropicta Zeller, 1875; Cryptolechia castigata Meyrick, 1926; Inga contrariella (Walker, 1864); Inga inscitella (Walker, 1864); Inga atropicta (Zeller, 1875)

= Inga sparsiciliella =

Species of moth

The black-marked inga moth (Inga sparsiciliella) is a species of moth of the family Oecophoridae. It has been recorded from Costa Rica, Mexico, Arkansas, Oklahoma, Missouri, Texas, South Carolina, Alabama, Florida, Georgia, North Carolina and Virginia.

The wingspan is about 16 mm.
