= Mundia =

- Town/city
- Location in Uttar Pradesh, India Mundia (India)
- Coordinates: 28.346°N 78.876°E
- Country: India
- State: Uttar Pradesh
- District: Badaun

Population (2001)
  - Total: 6,242

ENGLISH & HINDI
  - Official: Hindi
- Time zone: UTC+5:30 (IST)

Mundia is a town and a nagar panchayat in Badaun district in the Indian state of Uttar Pradesh.

== Demographics ==
As of 2001 India census, Mundia had a population of 6,242. Males constitute 53% of the population and females 47%. Mundia has an average literacy rate of 42%, lower than the national average of 59.5%: male literacy is 51%, and female literacy is 32%. In Mundia, 20% of the population is under 6 years of age.

== Another meaning ==
Mundia is a village in Bisauli tahsil of Badaun district of Uttar Pradesh with a pin of 202521.
