= Inga languida =

Scientific classification
- Kingdom: Animalia
- Phylum: Arthropoda
- Class: Insecta
- Order: Lepidoptera
- Superfamily: Gelechioidea
- Family: Oecophoridae
- Subfamily: Oecophorinae
- Genus: Inga
- Species: I. languida

Binomial name
- Inga languida (Meyrick, 1911)

Synonyms
- Machimia languida Meyrick, 1912; Himmacia languida

Species of moth

Inga languida is a moth in the family Oecophoridae. It was described by Edward Meyrick in 1911. It is found in Venezuela.

The wingspan is about 15 mm. The forewings are dull pink, sprinkled with grey. The stigmata are formed of blackish irroration (sprinkles) and there is strongly curved transverse series of dots of blackish irroration. The hindwings are ochreous whitish, more ochreous tinged towards the apex.
