= Inga refuga =

Scientific classification
- Kingdom: Animalia
- Phylum: Arthropoda
- Class: Insecta
- Order: Lepidoptera
- Superfamily: Gelechioidea
- Family: Oecophoridae
- Subfamily: Oecophorinae
- Genus: Inga
- Species: I. refuga

Binomial name
- Inga refuga (Meyrick, 1916)

Synonyms
- Machimia refuga Meyrick, 1916; Himmacia refuga

Species of moth

Inga refuga is a moth in the family Oecophoridae. It was described by Edward Meyrick in 1916. It is found in French Guiana.

The wingspan is about 17 mm. The forewings are white, slightly sprinkled with pale greyish ochreous except towards the costa anteriorly, the terminal edge is pale greyish ochreous. The stigmata are small and black and there is a strongly curved series of minute scattered black specks from beneath the costa at three-fourths to above the dorsum at two-thirds. The hindwings are grey whitish.
