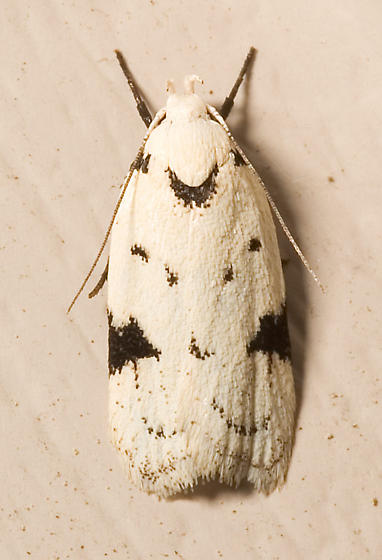
- Inga sparsiciliella

Scientific classification
- Domain: Eukaryota
- Kingdom: Animalia
- Phylum: Arthropoda
- Class: Insecta
- Order: Lepidoptera
- Family: Oecophoridae
- Subfamily: Oecophorinae
- Genus: Inga; Busck, 1908

Synonyms
- Doxa Walsingham, 1912; Lysigrapha Meyrick, 1914; Pelomimas Meyrick, 1914; Orsimacha Meyrick, 1914; Siderograptis Meyrick, 1920; Phanerodoxa Meyrick, 1921; Epimoryctis Meyrick, 1930; Horomeristis Meyrick, 1931; Agriotorna Meyrick, 1931

= Inga (moth) =

Genus of moths

Inga is a genus of moths of the family Oecophoridae.

== Species ==
- Inga analis (Busck, 1914)
- Inga ancorata (Walsingham, 1912)
- Inga brevisella (Walker, 1864)
- Inga callierastis (Meyrick, 1920)
- Inga calycocentra (Meyrick, 1931)
- Inga camelopis (Meyrick, 1920)
- Inga canariella (Busck, 1908)
- Inga cancanodes (Meyrick, 1918)
- Inga catasticta (Meyrick, 1920)
- Inga caumatias (Meyrick, 1929)
- Inga cerophaea (Meyrick, 1914)
- Inga chlorochroa (Meyrick, 1912)
- Inga ciliella (Busck, 1908)
- Inga cnecodes (Meyrick, 1920)
- Inga concinna (Meyrick, 1912)
- Inga concolorella (Beutenmüller, 1888)
- Inga conserva (Meyrick, 1914)
- Inga corystes (Meyrick, 1914)
- Inga cretacea (Zeller, 1873)
- Inga crossota (Walsingham, 1912)
- Inga crucifera (Busck, 1914)
- Inga cupidinea (Meyrick, 1914)
- Inga custodita (Meyrick, 1928)
- Inga cyclophthalma (Meyrick, 1916)
- Inga deligata (Meyrick, 1914)
- Inga dilecta (Meyrick, 1920)
- Inga distorta (Meyrick, 1920)
- Inga elaphodes (Meyrick, 1930)
- Inga empyrea (Meyrick, 1920)
- Inga encamina (Meyrick, 1912)
- Inga entaphrota (Meyrick, 1915)
- Inga erasicosma (Meyrick, 1916)
- Inga eriocnista (Meyrick, 1931)
- Inga erotias (Meyrick, 1912)
- Inga erythema (Walsingham, 1912)
- Inga fervida (Zeller, 1855)
- Inga flava (Zeller, 1839)
- Inga fundigera (Meyrick, 1912)
- Inga furva (Meyrick, 1916)
- Inga genuina (Meyrick, 1914)
- Inga haemataula (Meyrick, 1912)
- Inga halosphora (Meyrick, 1916)
- Inga helobia (Meyrick, 1931)
- Inga hyperbolica (Meyrick, 1928)
- Inga icterota (Meyrick, 1914)
- Inga incensatella (Walker, 1864)
- Inga inflammata (Meyrick, 1916)
- Inga iracunda (Meyrick, 1914)
- Inga lacunata (Meyrick, 1914)
- Inga languida (Meyrick, 1912)
- Inga leptophragma (Meyrick, 1920)
- Inga libidinosa (Meyrick, 1926)
- Inga loxobathra (Meyrick, 1915)
- Inga meliacta (Meyrick, 1914)
- Inga mercata (Meyrick, 1914)
- Inga mimobathra (Meyrick, 1920)
- Inga mixadelpha (Meyrick, 1914)
- Inga molifica (Meyrick, 1914)
- Inga molybdopa (Meyrick, 1920)
- Inga mydopis (Meyrick, 1914)
- Inga neospila (Meyrick, 1928)
- Inga obscuromaculella (Chambers, 1878)
- Inga orthodoxa (Meyrick, 1912)
- Inga orthophragma (Meyrick, 1916)
- Inga pachybathra (Meyrick, 1921)
- Inga pagana (Meyrick, 1916)
- Inga pagidotis (Meyrick, 1918)
- Inga percnorma (Meyrick, 1930)
- Inga pericyclota (Meyrick, 1920)
- Inga perioditis (Meyrick, 1928)
- Inga petasodes (Meyrick, 1914)
- Inga phaeocrossa (Meyrick, 1912)
- Inga plectanota (Meyrick, 1918)
- Inga porpotis (Meyrick, 1914)
- Inga proditrix Hodges, 1974
- Inga pyrothyris (Meyrick, 1916)
- Inga pyrrhoxantha (Meyrick, 1931)
- Inga refuga (Meyrick, 1916)
- Inga rhodoclista (Meyrick, 1916)
- Inga rimatrix Hodges, 1974
- Inga rosea (Meyrick, 1920)
- Inga roseomarginella (Busck, 1911)
- Inga ruricola (Meyrick, 1914)
- Inga satura (Meyrick, 1914)
- Inga sciocrates (Meyrick, 1929)
- Inga sciotoxa (Meyrick, 1914)
- Inga semotella (Meyrick, 1921)
- Inga separatella (Walker, 1864)
- Inga signifera (Meyrick, 1914)
- Inga sodalis (Walsingham, 1912)
- Inga sparsiciliella (Clemens, 1864)
- Inga speculatrix (Meyrick, 1914)
- Inga staphylitis (Meyrick, 1916)
- Inga stativa (Meyrick, 1920)
- Inga stereodesma (Meyrick, 1916)
- Inga taboga (Busck, 1914)
- Inga textrina (Meyrick, 1914)
- Inga thermoxantha (Meyrick, 1914)
- Inga trailii (Butler, 1877)
- Inga trifurcata (Meyrick, 1918)
- Inga trygaula (Meyrick, 1912)
- Inga tubicen (Meyrick, 1921)
- Inga versatilis (Meyrick, 1921)
- Inga virginia (Busck, 1914)
- Inga voluptaria (Meyrick, 1914)
