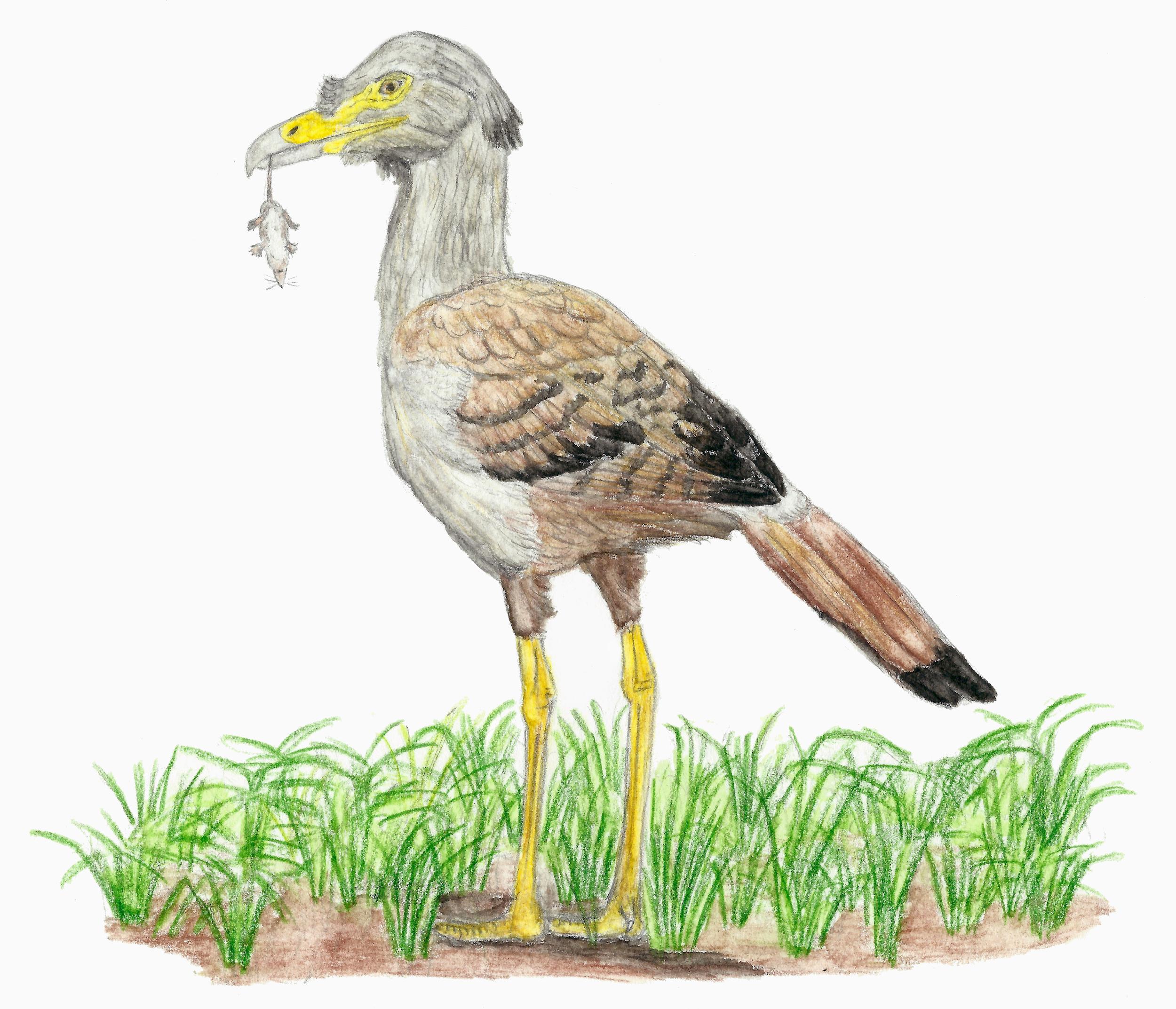
- Hypothetic life restoration of Bathornis grallator, based on known material and modern seriemas.

Scientific classification
- Kingdom: Animalia
- Phylum: Chordata
- Class: Aves
- Order: Cariamiformes
- Family: †Bathornithidae
- Genus: †Bathornis; Wetmore, 1927

Type species
- †Bathornis veredus Wetmore, 1927

Species
- †B. celeripes Wetmore, 1933 †B. cursor Wetmore, 1933 †B. fricki Ostrom, 1961 †B. geographicus Wetmore, 1942 †B. grallator Olson, 1985 †B. minor †B. veredus Wetmore, 1927 and see text.

Synonyms
- Neocathartes; Palaeogyps; Palaeocrex

= Bathornis =

Bathornis Temporal range: Late Eocene - Early Miocene 37–20 Ma

Extinct genus of birds

Bathornis ("tall bird") is an extinct genus of birds related to modern day seriemas, that lived in North America about 37–20 million years ago. Like the closely related and also extinct phorusrhacids, it was a flightless predator, occupying predatory niches in environments classically considered to be dominated by mammals. It was a highly diverse and successful genus, spanning a large number of species that occurred from the Priabonian Eocene to the Burdigalian Miocene epochs.

== Description ==
Though most material is highly incomplete, Bathornis is nonetheless known from a variety of skeletal elements: hindlimbs (most commonly tarso-metatarsals), forelimb elements (especially humeri), pelvises and skulls. Bathornis grallator is known from a mostly complete skeleton, including the skull, bearing a proportionally large, hooked beak. The bathornithid second toe is currently unknown, but the first toe is highly reduced, as with most Cariamiformes, and like phorusrhacids it possesses a robust jugal and reduced processus acrocoracoideus of coracoid, two features possibly having evolved in convergence due to their similar lifestyle.

Overall, Bathornis is a long-legged, short-winged, large-skulled bird, similar in shape to phorusrhacids. Its numerous species span a large diversity of body sizes, ranging from forms about as large as modern seriemas to 2-meter-tall (6.6 ft) animals.

== Classification ==
Bathornis is the type genus of Bathornithidae, a family of Cariamiformes, related to the modern seriemas (this relationship has been recognised ever since its first description) and also a variety of extinct forms like phorusrhacids, Strigogyps and idiornithids, in turn part of the Australaves assemblage that also includes falcons, passerines and parrots. (Note: Because Cariamiformes were erroneously classified as Gruiformes through most of the 19th, 20th and early 21st centuries, several sources listed refer to these birds as Gruiformes.) Interspecific relations within the Cariamiformes are highly volatile and unresolved, bathornithids at times having been listed as sister taxa to seriemas, phorusrhacids and idiornithids, sometimes even as a polyphyletic group.

It is usually considered the sister clade to Paracrax, and several authorities consider Neocathartes and several other taxa to be nested with it (see below). However, at least one phylogenetic study recovers Bathornis (and its synonyms) as more closely related to phorusrhacids than to Paracrax, though this is considered premature and based on far too few synapomorphies.

A recent phylogenetic study found Bathornis to be the sole representative of Bathornithidae, within Cariamiformes but outside of the clade composing seriemas and phorusrhacids. Paracrax is found to be outside of Bathornithidae, with its status as a Cariamiformes uncertain. A 2024 study however finds Bathornis as closer to seriemas than phorusrhacids were.

== Discovery and naming ==
The type species is B. veredus, its type specimen being Denver Mus. Nat. Hist. No. 805, a limb element (distal portion of a metatarsus), recovered by Philip Reinheinter from Oligocene deposits of Weld County, Colorado, which also heralded the cathartid Phasmagyps. First described by Alexander Wetmore, the bird was referred as a "cedicnemidid" (a wastebasket taxon for "thick-knee" birds) related to modern seriemas, erecting the subfamily Bathornithinae. Two birds described alongside it, the putative rallid Palaeocrex and the putative cathartid Palaeogyps, would later turn out to be bathornithid material, the latter in particular synonymous with B. veredus.

The bird was noted as being massive in comparison to its modern seriema relatives, presumably the reason as to receive its genus name, "tall bird". The species name, "veredus", is not given an explanation, though it is a Latin word relating to speed.

== Species ==
Bathornis is noted for its high number of species, and is the most speciose of all Cariamiformes, extinct or extant. A minimum of five species are consistently recognised, with several otherwise monotypic taxa often either aligned with this genus or rendered outright synonyms of established species. Some caution has been suggested, given the possibility that some sympatric species might actually represent different sexes or morphs, though the vast temporal spanning of the genus still offers a large diversity.

=== Bathornis veredus ===
The type species, whose discovery and etymology is mentioned above. It is known from Eocene and Oligocene deposits of the Chadron Formation in Colorado and Nebraska. It is known from multiple tibiotarsal material, depicting an animal roughly the size of a modern emu, something that earned it the description of "one of the most remarkable of recent additions to our fossil avifauna." Skull material from this species is also known.

=== Bathornis cursor ===
A species first described by Alexander Wetmore in 1933. Though occurring in the same deposits as B. veredus and similar to it in size, B. cursor is nonetheless considered distinct due to several features of the trochlea. Wetmore referred to the bird as "a large edition of Bathornis celeripes from the same deposits", but posterior analysis showcases strong distinction from that taxon as well, and it occurs in considerably earlier deposits.

=== Bathornis geographicus ===
A species first described by Alexander Wetmore in 1942. An upper Oligocene species from deposits in South Dakota, Nebraska and Wyoming, quite possibly a direct descendant of B. veredus itself. It is a larger bird than B. veredus and B. cursor, quite possibly the largest described member of the genus, and it co-existed with the similar sized Paracrax gigantea in the Brule Formation, where it shared a macropredatory role with it and mammals like Hyaenodon.

=== Bathornis fax ===
Originally referred to the rallid genus Palaeocrex (in the same paper originally describing B. veredus, no less), further examination has shown it to belong to Bathornis. There is some doubt about whereas it represents a different species or a younger morph of B. veredus.; if it is its own independent species, it is among the smallest forms at about the size of a modern seriema.

=== Bathornis celeripes ===
A species described by Wetmore in 1958, dating to the upper Oligocene deposits of South Dakota. It is relatively well studied at about 16 specimens, mostly of hindlimbs but also forelimb and shoulder girdle material. Though it was described as a smaller variant of B. cursor by Wetmore, it was actually similar to it in size, though it was still dwarfed by the larger B. geographicus and the larger Paracrax species, which would have co-existed with it.

=== Bathornis fricki ===
One of the youngest of all bathornithid species, (Note: "It is remarkable that no Miocene descendants except Bathornis fricki have been found, but such absence of material probably reflects the immature stage of avian paleontology rather than an abrupt extinction of these birds.") recovered form Early Miocene Arikareean deposits in Willow Creek. There is a strong similarity to B. celeripes, and some researchers consider it to be the direct ancestor of B. fricki.

=== Bathornis minor ===
A species conspecific with B. fricki, known from a similar tibiotarsus that differs in several respects from its contemporary.

=== Bathornis grallator ===
B. grallator is known from the late Eocene Washakie Formation of Wyoming; similar fossils have been described from the Willwood Formation, but their status as Cariamiformes, let alone bathornithids, are unclear. Originally interpreted as a terrestrial cathartid, Storrs Olson reassigned it to Bathornis in 1985:

The reconstruction published with the original description of Neocathartes has often been reprinted and has now made the "terrestrial vulture" an integral part of the lore of avian paleontology. Well, forget it.

Neocathartes is just our old friend Bathornis in another guise.

Since then, posterior researchers have flip-flopped in their evaluation of Neocathartes as a junior synonym of Bathornis, but most recent studies consistently refer to it within this genus.

=== Other forms ===
Several undescribed remains from the late Eocene and Oligocene have been putatively assigned to Bathornis.

== Palaeobiology ==
Bathornis as a whole were large, terrestrial birds with long and powerful legs. Most if not all species are thought to having been flightless (B. grallator is traditionally considered as having been volant, but has since been found to be flightless), perhaps more specialised to this regard than even Paracrax, having proportionally short wings and keel, as well as a reduced processus acrocoracoideus in the coracoid.

Bathornis was a carnivorous bird. Bathornis grallator and Bathornis veredus showcase that it had a strong beak akin to that of phorusrhacids, even sharing an identical reinforcement of the jugal, implicating a similar biting stresses. As Bathornis species reached large sizes, it is likely that they were apex predators within their environment, much as their South American phorusrhacid cousins; alongside the closely related Paracrax, they are examples of large predatory birds managing to compete successfully with mammals, having co-existed with large carnivorous mammals for over 17 million years.

== Palaeoecology ==
Due to its longevity and high number of species, Bathornis spanned across several different types of environment. As a rule of thumb, however, its known range occurred around what is now the Great Plains; this prompted Wetmore to imagine it as a strider in open plains environments:

Geologists, from available evidence, inform its that North America during the Oligocene was comparatively level with low relief, so that we may imagine the species here under discussion as coursing over extensive plains.

However, more recent analyses conclude that it probably favoured wetland biomes.

In either case, Bathornis is found among rich mammalian faunas. B. cursor is found in close association with Megacerops, and B. geographicus with Merycoidodon, which might imply predation on these mammals. It shared its environment with several carnivorous mammals like hyaenodontids, entelodonts and nimravids, as well as the fellow cariamiform Paracrax, with which it would have competed. In particular, there may be evidence of niche partitioning with the latter, as it occurs in drier environments.
