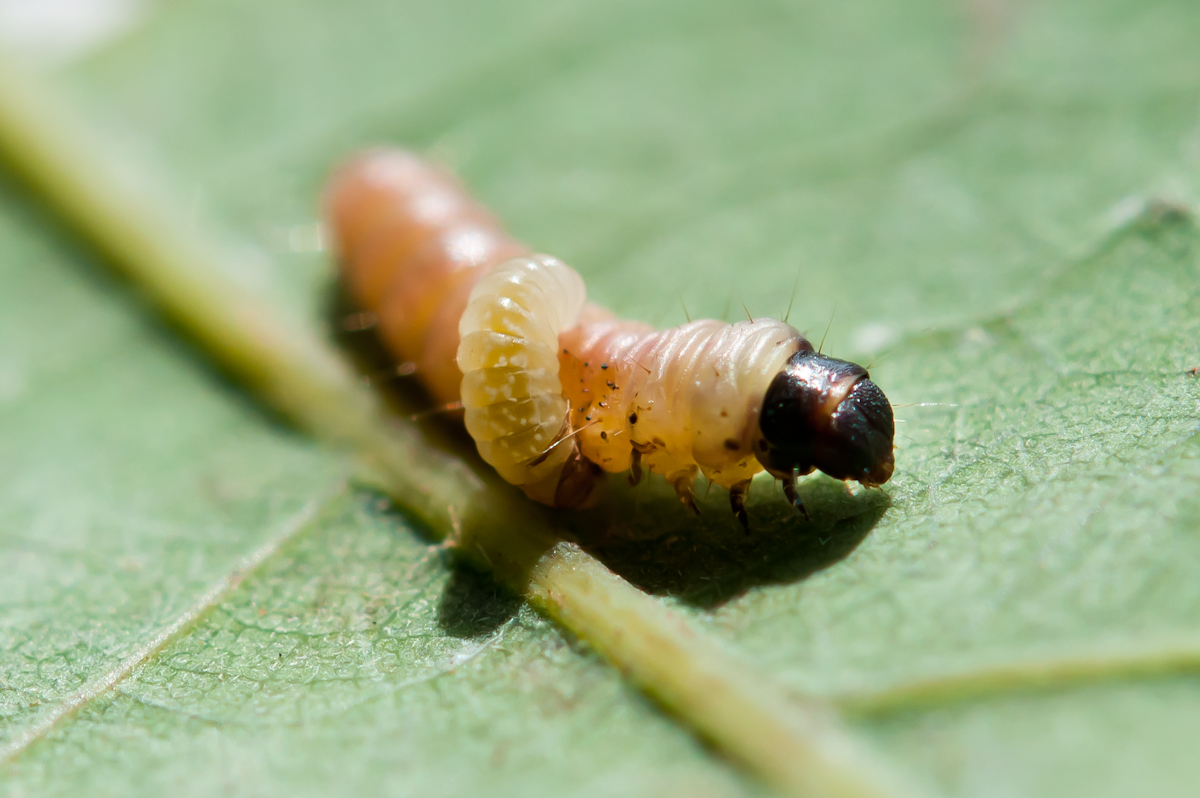
- Psilocorsis cryptolechiella with parasitoid wasp larvae feeding on it

Scientific classification
- Kingdom: Animalia
- Phylum: Arthropoda
- Clade: Pancrustacea
- Class: Insecta
- Order: Lepidoptera
- Family: Depressariidae
- Genus: Psilocorsis; Clemens, 1860

Synonyms
- Paepia Walker, 1864; Hagno Chambers, 1872

= Psilocorsis =

Genus of moths

Psilocorsis is a genus of moths of the family Depressariidae.

== Species ==
- Psilocorsis amydra Hodges, 1961
- Psilocorsis arguta Hodges, 1961
- Psilocorsis argyropasta Walsingham, 1912
- Psilocorsis carpocapsella (Walker, 1864)
- Psilocorsis cirrhoptera Hodges, 1961
- Psilocorsis cryptolechiella Chambers, 1872
- Psilocorsis exagitata Meyrick, 1926
- Psilocorsis indalma Walsingham, 1912
- Psilocorsis fatula Hodges, 1975
- Psilocorsis melanophthalma Meyrick, 1928
- Psilocorsis minerva Meyrick, 1928
- Psilocorsis propriella (Zeller, 1877)
- Psilocorsis purpurascens Walsingham, 1912
- Psilocorsis quercicella Clemens, 1860
- Psilocorsis reflexella Clemens, 1860
