= Paracrax =

Paracrax Temporal range: Rupelian ~33–30 Ma

Scientific classification
- Kingdom: Animalia
- Phylum: Chordata
- Class: Aves
- Order: Cariamiformes (?)
- Family: †Bathornithidae (?)
- Genus: †Paracrax; Pierce Brodkorb 1964

Type species
- †Paracrax antiqua Brodkorb 1964

Species
- †Paracrax antiqua; †Paracrax gigantea; †Paracrax wetmorei

Synonyms
- Meleagris antiquus; Phalacrocorax/Oligocrocorax mediterranus

Extinct genus of birds

Paracrax ("near curassow") is a genus of extinct North American flightless birds, possibly related to modern seriemas and the extinct terror birds. Part of Bathornithidae (though some analysis recover it as closer to the living seriemas instead, or possibly entirely out of Cariamiformes), it is a specialised member of this group, being cursorial carnivores much like their South American cousins, some species attaining massive sizes.

== Discovery ==
Paracrax antiqua is the genus type species. The type specimen, YPM 537, was collected in Weld County, Colorado, in 1871 by Othniel Charles Marsh, which identified it as a sort of turkey. It was posteriorly referred to Cracidae by Pierce Brodkorb, before its identity as a bathornithid came to light. Material previously identified as a cormorant, "Phalacrocorax/Oligocrocorax" mediterraneus, was posteriorly identified as P. antiqua remains.

Since then, two more species have been identified: P. wetmorei and P. gigantea. These were more closely related to each other than to P. antiqua.

== Paleoecology ==
Most specimens have been found on the Brule Formation of North Dakota. Dating to the Rupelian stage of the Oligocene, it is composed of river deposits that showcase the remains of a rich savanna-like environment. Several large sized mammal groups are known from this region, such as rhinoceri, oreodonts and hyaenodonts, all co-existing with several flightless bathornithids. Bathornis, a possible close relative of Paracrax, appears to have favoured wetter ecosystems, while Paracrax occurs in drier environments.

== Appearance ==
Paracrax is known from a variety of materials, such as pelvises, keels, forelimb elements and coracoids. The humerus material is distinct from the closely related Bathornis by an internal condyle that is less distinctively raised in relation to the external condyle. Overall, it can be assumed that it had similar proportions to phorusrhacids, with proportionally short wings and a large, deep bill.

The keel is rather proportionally shallow, like a ratite's. It has unique characteristics quite unlike the sternum of any other bird (though vaguely convergent to that of the modern hoatzin), making it easily identifiable. Both P. antiqua and P. gigantea were clearly flightless, being large birds with far too short forelimbs and keels, the former in particular having highly reduced metacarpals, though P. wetmorei might have still been capable of limited flight.

Paracrax gigantea in particular is a very large bird, reaching estimated heights of over 2 m (6 ft 7 in), making it among the largest of bathornithids and among the tallest animals in its environment.

== Lifestyle ==
Like most Cariamiformes, including other bathornithids, Paracrax was likely a terrestrial carnivore. In terms of ecology, it would probably have been similar to its more famous relatives, the phorusrhacid terror birds, being a large, flightless killer and using its large axe-like beak to subdue and kill its prey. It is a prime example of a large flightless predatory bird co-existing with large predatory mammals, such as the conspecific Hyaenodon, Dinictis, and Archaeotherium with which it probably shared an apex predator role in its environment.
