= Joel Cracraft =

American paleontologist and ornithologist

- Born: July 31, 1942 (age 83)
- Education: University of Oklahoma, B.S., 1964; Louisiana State University, M.S., 1966; Columbia University Ph.D. (1969)
- Scientific career
- Fields: Paleontology; Taxonomy
- Thesis: Functional Morphology of Locomotion in Birds (1969)

Joel Lester Cracraft (born July 31, 1942), is an American paleontologist and ornithologist. He received a PhD in 1969 from Columbia University (Functional Morphology of Locomotion in Birds).

His research interests include: theory and methods of comparative biology, evolutionary theory, biological diversification, systematics, the evolution of morphological systems, historical biogeography, molecular systematics and evolution.

From 1970 he has been a research associate at the Field Museum of Natural History, Chicago; from 1970 to 1992, full professor at the University of Illinois Chicago; from 1993 to 1994, acting director of the Center for Biodiversity and Conservation at the American Museum of Natural History; from 1992, adjunct professor at the CUNY Graduate Center; from 1997 adjunct professor at Columbia University; from 1992 curator at American Museum of Natural History; and from 2002 Lamont Curator of Birds at American Museum of Natural History.

== Taxa authored ==
- Certhiasomus (2015)
- Hirundineinae (2009)
- Microrhopiini (2009)

== Publications ==
- Cracraft, J. (2009). "Continental drift, paleoclimatology, and the evolution and biogeography of birds". Journal of Zoology. 169 (4): 455–543. doi:10.1111/j.1469-7998.1973.tb03122.x. ISSN 0952-8369.
- Cracraft, J. (1974). "Phylogenetic Models and Classification". Systematic Biology. 23 (1): 71–90. doi:10.1093/sysbio/23.1.71. ISSN 1063-5157.
- Cracraft, J. (2008). "Phylogeny and evolution of the ratite birds". Ibis. 116 (4): 494–521. doi:10.1111/j.1474-919X.1974.tb07648.x. ISSN 0019-1019.
- Eldredge, N.; Cracraft, J. (1980). Phylogenetic patterns and the evolutionary process. Method and theory in comparative biology. New York: Columbia University Press. ISBN 0-231-03802-X.
- Cracraft, J. (1981). "Toward a phylogenetic classification of recent birds of the world (Class Aves)" (PDF). The Auk. 98 (4): 681–714. doi:10.1093/auk/98.4.681 (inactive July 1, 2025).
- Cracraft, J. (1983). Species concepts and speciation analysis in Current Ornithology. Plenum Press, New York. pp. 159–187. doi:10.1007/978-1-4615-6781-3_6.
- Cracraft, J. (1985). "Historical Biogeography and Patterns of Differentiation within the South American Avifauna: Areas of Endemism". Ornithological Monographs (36): 49–84. doi:10.2307/40168278. ISSN 0078-6594. JSTOR 40168278.
- Cracraft, J. (1988). "Deep-history Biogeography: Retrieving the Historical Pattern of Evolving Continental Biotas". Systematic Biology. 37 (3): 221–236. CiteSeerX 10.1.1.1022.9061. doi:10.1093/sysbio/37.3.221. ISSN 1063-5157.
- Cracraft, J. (1988) The major clades of birds in: The phylogeny and classification of the tetrapods 1: 339–361.
- Cracraft, J. (1989). Chapter 2: Speciation and its ontology: the empirical consequences of alternative species concepts for understanding patterns and processes of differentiation (PDF). Vol. 28. p. 59.
- Cracraft, J.; Donoghue, M.J., eds. (2004). Assembling the Tree of Life. Oxford University Press. ISBN 0-19-517234-5.
- Barker, F. K.; Cibois, A.; Schikler, P.; Feinstein, J.; Cracraft, J. (2004). "Phylogeny and diversification of the largest avian radiation". Proceedings of the National Academy of Sciences. 101 (30): 11040–11045. Bibcode:2004PNAS..10111040B. doi:10.1073/pnas.0401892101. ISSN 0027-8424. PMC 503738. PMID 15263073.
- Claramunt, S.; Cracraft, J. (2015). "A new time tree reveals Earth history's imprint on the evolution of modern birds". Science Advances. 1 (11) e1501005. Bibcode:2015SciA....1E1005C. doi:10.1126/sciadv.1501005. PMC 4730849. PMID 26824065.
